= Fala (album) =

Compilation album by various Polish punk rock/reggae/new wave bands
- Released: 1985
- Recorded: 1979–1984 (Poland)
- Genre: Punk rock Reggae; New wave music
- Length: 41:30
- Label: Polton (LPP-014)
- Producer: Dr Avane

Fala is a compilation album, published by Poland's record label Polton in 1985. Fala is regarded as the first official presentation of Polish punk rock, new wave music as well as reggae, and most of the songs in the album were recorded at the 1984 Jarocin Festival. The album was the idea of Sławomir Gołaszewski, who asked Robert Brylewski for help with the selection of songs.

The album was produced by Dr Avane, together with Włodzimierz Kowalczyk and Tadeusz Czehak. Mix, overdub – Ekipa Dub Regulator, Shpenyagah, Max Hebel, Dr Avane. Graphic design – Alek Januszewski. Photos – Robert Sobociński, Antoni Zdebiak, Prowokacja.

== Track listing ==
Side 1

1. 12 RA 3L – "Intro" – 0:45
2. Bakshish – "Czarna droga" (J. Kowalczyk, J. Kowalczyk) – 3:50
3. Prowokacja – "Prawo do życia, czyli kochanej mamusi" (Prowokacja, Prowokacja) – 2:55
4. Siekiera – "Fala" (T. Adamski, T. Adamski) – 1:25
5. Siekiera – "Idzie wojna" (T. Adamski, T. Adamski) – 3:35
6. Abaddon – "Kto" (Abaddon, Abaddon) – 2:00
7. Tilt – "Za zamkniętymi drzwiami (Widziałem cię)" (T. Lipiński, T. Lipiński) – 3:25

Side 2

1. Dezerter – "Nie ma zagrożenia" (Dezerter, Dezerter) – 2:30
2. Kryzys – "Mam dość" (R. Brylewski, M. Góralski) – 2:50
3. Kultura – "Lew Ja i Ja Dub" (Kultura, Kultura) – 2:30
4. Rio Ras – "City Huk" (Rio Ras, Rio Ras) – 3:30
5. Dezerter – "Plakat" (Dezerter, Dezerter) – 3:10
6. Izrael – "Wolność" (R. Brylewski, R. Brylewski) – 8:10
7. Józef Broda – "Swoboda" (J. Broda, J. Broda) – 0:55
