= Jak punk to punk =

Compilation album by various Polish punk rock bands
- Released: 1988
- Recorded: 1986 (Poland)
- Genre: Punk rock
- Label: Tonpress (SX-T61)
- Producer: Włodzimierz Kowalczyk and Tadeusz Czechak

Jak punk to punk (Polish language: If it is punk, then it is punk) is a Polish compilation album, published by the record label Tonpress in 1988. The album features songs of various Polish punk rock bands of the 1980s, including Armia, Dezerter and Siekiera. Jak punk to punk was produced by Włodzimierz Kowalczyk and Tadeusz Czechak.

== Track listing ==
1. Armia – "Na ulice" (Tomasz Budzyński)
2. Armia – "Jestem drzewo, jestem ptak" (T. Budzyński)
3. Armia – "Jeżeli..." (T. Budzyński)
4. Dezerter – "Nas nie ma" (Krzysztof Grabowski/ Robert Matera)
5. Dezerter – "Uległość" (Dariusz Hajn / Paweł Piotrowski)
6. Rejestracja – "Numer 1125" (T. Murawski/ T. Siatka)
7. Rejestracja – "Wszystko można otoczyć mgłą" (T. Murawski/ T. Siatka)
8. TZN Xenna – "Gazety mówią" (M. Kucharski/ K. Chojnacki)
9. TZN Xenna – "Co za świat?" (M. Kucharski/ K. Chojnacki)
10. Siekiera – "Ja stoję, ja tańczę, ja walczę" (Tomasz Adamski)
11. Siekiera – "Ludzie wschodu" (T. Adamski)
12. Abaddon – "Wet za wet" (Abaddon)
13. Abaddon – "Kto?" (Abaddon)
14. Process – "Stroszek" (Process)
