= Robert Brylewski =

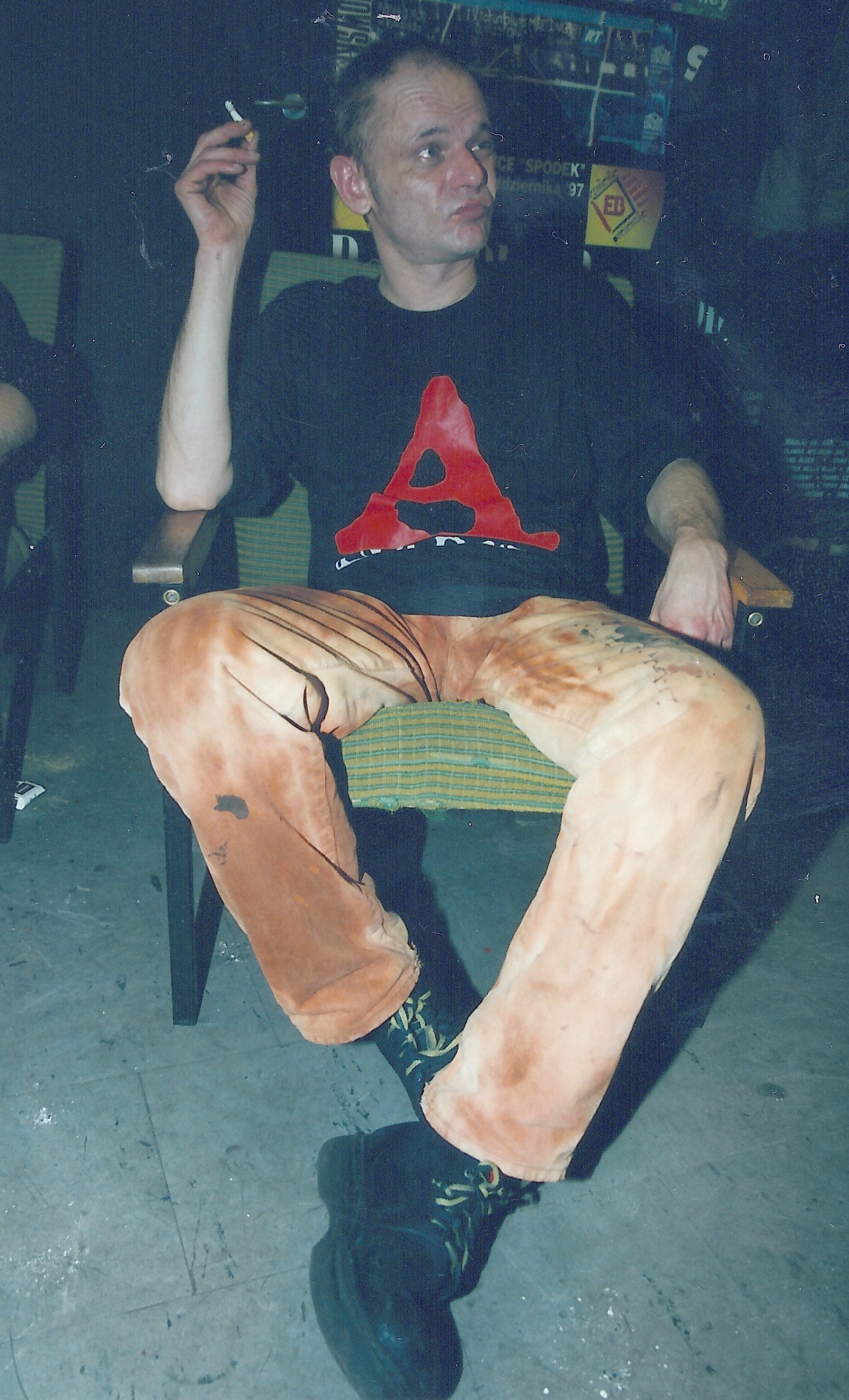
- Born: Robert Maksymilian Brylewski; 25 May 1961; Warsaw, Poland
- Died: 3 June 2018 (aged 57); Warsaw, Poland
- Occupations: Musician, singer-songwriter
- Partner: Vivian Quarcoo
- Children: Sara Brylewska; Ewa Brylewska
- Musical career
- Also known as: Afa, Robi Goldroker
- Genres: Punk rock, reggae, new wave, hardcore punk
- Instruments: Vocals, guitar, keyboards
- Years active: 1978–2018
- Labels: Polton, Pronit, Arston, Phonex, Gold Rock, W Moich Oczach, Lemon Records

Robert Maksymilian Brylewski, also known as. Afa and Robin Goldroker (25 May 1961 – 3 June 2018), was a Polish musician and singer-songwriter, co-founder of bands Kryzys, Brygada Kryzys, Izrael and Armia.

In May 2012, Brylewski's autobiography, titled "Kryzys w Babilonie" ("Crisis in Babylon"), was published by the Wydawnictwo Literackie publishing house. The book has 584 pages and is based on a conversation between Brylewski and Polish Playboy journalist Rafał Księżyk. In the book, Brylewski answers numerous questions about his childhood, youth, music, and private life.

== Early years ==
Brylewski's father Waldemar was born in Czeladź, Zagłębie Dąbrowskie, while his mother Hanna is from Warsaw. The two met in the 1950s, while dancing for the famous Śląsk Song and Dance Ensemble. Robert was their only child, and the future musician, even though born in Warsaw, spent most of his childhood in a castle at Koszęcin, where all members of the ensemble lived. Brylewski returned to Warsaw with his mother in the early 1970s; his parents divorced when he was 13, and Robert admitted in the book that as a teenager, he had a lot of freedom, as his mother toured Poland, dancing and singing, and his father remained at Koszęcin. Brylewski attended Warsaw's renowned 11th High School, but did not graduate, because, as he claims, while still there, he decided not to pursue any career or go to college, but to become a musician.

As a teenager, Brylewski played association football, was a member of the Polish Scouting and Guiding Association, and later on, became interested in rock music. In the early 1970s, his father spent some time in the United States, from where he brought several records. At that time, rock shows were frequently organized at Warsaw's Congress Hall, and Brylewski attended them, as well as Warsaw's Jazz Jamboree Festival. To avoid military service, which was obligatory in Communist Poland, he faked mental illness.

== 1978 – 1982 ==
In the late 1970s, Brylewski read an article in Życie Warszawy about British punk rock movement. Impressed by the music of The Clash, Sex Pistols, Buzzcocks and other bands, he went to see the first punk rock concert in Poland, featuring The Raincoats (1 April 1978, at Riviera Remont Student Culture Center in Warsaw). After the show, he decided to start his own band, together with students of a high school from Wilanów, Kamil Stoor and Paweł "Kelner" Rozwadowski. They named their band The Boors, and after Stoor had left Poland for Sweden, with a new lineup, the band was renamed into Kryzys (Crisis, May 1979). Due to the connections of band's manager, Jacek Olechowski (brother of Andrzej Olechowski), Kryzys toured Poland in 1979 – 1981, with such bands, as Kombi, Turbo, Exodus, and singers, such as John Porter, and Izabela Trojanowska. Brylewski wrote music for Kryzys, while lyrics were authored by the band's drummer, Maciej "Magura" Góralski. In 1981, they played at National Festival of Polish Song in Opole, together with Dżem, Perfect and Bank.

Kryzys ceased to exist in July 1981, and in early August 1981, Brylewski knocked on the door of the flat of Tomasz "Frantz" Lipiński (son of Eryk Lipiński), whose own band, Tilt, had been dissolved at that time as well. During the first meeting, both musicians agreed to start a new band. Since manager Jacek Orzechowski insisted on keeping the word Kryzys, Lipiński suggested adding the word Brygada, therefore Brygada Kryzys (Crisis Brigade) was born. The leaders of the band described its music as punkadelic, and first show took place in September 1981 at Riviera Remont Student Culture Center in Warsaw, together with Republika. The concert was recorded and illegally published in Great Britain, as Brygada Kryzys Live. In November 1981, Brygada Kryzys toured Poland together with a British band TV 21. During the tour, Brylewski was badly beaten in a restaurant at a hotel in Gdańsk. Then, in early December 1981, Brygada Kryzys went to Belgrade, to participate in the Days of Young Polish Culture. The bus with both Brygada Kryzys and Maanam was not allowed entry into Czechoslovakia at the border crossing in Cieszyn, so it had to return to Warsaw, from where Brygada Kryzys flew to Belgrade. As Brylewski said in his autobiography: "The spirit of Josip Broz Tito was still in the air, but they all sensed that after his death, the country would break into pieces. They welcomed us as stars, as a legend". (page 126). On 20 December 1981 (see Martial Law in Poland), Brylewski was beaten up by the Communist police.

Unlike such bands, as Maanam, TSA, Republika or Lombard, Brygada Kryzys refused to play at government-sponsored shows. The band recorded its first album in February – March 1982 (due to the color of the cover, it was called the Black Album or the Black Brygada), and in the summer of that year, the band left for the village of Wólki, near Lublin. The situation of the martial law, however, was not good, and in the autumn of 1982, Lipiński decided to split from the band. Brygada Kryzys ceased to exist, as Brylewski later said in his autobiography: "I was expecting this to happen. I sensed that Tomek was feeling down, and I was not surprised. Nothing was happening with Brygada, I bore that situation better than Tomek, while it all frustrated him, he was older, he counted on something more. One day he just packed his guitar and said it was all over". (page 155).

== 1983 -1985 ==
After dissolution of Brygada Kryzys, Brylewski shortly played in a band called Anarchia. In early spring of 1983, together with Paweł "Kelner" Rozwadowski, they founded reggae band Izrael. The name was invented by Brylewski in March 1983. As he said in his biography, he had used to listen to ska music, such bands, as The Specials, The Beat, or Madness. He also liked The Clash, and as he says, in reggae he found independent culture, which was not created by the government or by the market. He began to wear dreadlocks, but never used to call himself a rastaman. At that time (1983–1985), Brylewski used to read the Bible, the Koran and the Bhagavad Gita, he was also impressed by Pope John Paul II: "In reggae I found independent culture, which was not created by government's agencies or the markets, but it was created by itself, on the street, and nothing could stop its expansion. Punk rock also was a spontaneous movement, not to be stopped. After punk rock, we were hungry for such energy. In reggae I was inspired by the energy of the music, and later I came to know that it was a widely understood culture, which was not only about entertainment, but also about spirituality, social and mental changes" (page 174 of Brylewski's autobiography).

Izrael was founded in March 1983, and in May of that year, its first LP, called Biada, Biada, Biada was recorded in a studio at Wawrzyszew, district of Warsaw (it also was the first album of a Polish reggae band, but was not published until 1985). Brylewski wrote songs for it together with Rozwadowski, at Kelner's apartment located in a Communist high rise at Sadyba: "In 1983 there was nothing attractive happening. Communication was not easy, so I spent plenty of time with Kelner. We stayed at his apartment, practising together. I played the guitar, Kelner played the bass, and then we switched". (page 193). Soon after recording the album, Izrael toured Poland, together with Misty in Roots (summer 1983).

During one of band's shows, which took place in Kraków, Brylewski met his future wife Vivian Quarcoo, a Polish-African singer in a jazz band. She began to sing with Izrael, and after some time, moved in with Robert. Their first daughter Sara was born in 1986, second daughter Ewa, in 1990. In 1984 – 1986, Izrael toured Poland, playing at various festivals, including FAMA at Świnoujście, Jarocin Festival, and Brodnica Music Camping. One of Izrael's concerts, which took place on 9 May 1986 at Opole, was broken down by the ZOMO. In 1985, Brylewski began to cooperate with Dariusz Malejonek, who had his own reggae band, Kultura. In the course of the time, the two bands merged, keeping the name Izrael. Together with bandmates, Brylewski did not drink a lot of alcohol, smoking marijuana instead. As he said in his autobiography: "Smoking marijuana had special importance for us. It built new links, as grass functioned at that time in different circumstances than now. People would not sell it to each other, they shared it". (page 235).

In the summer 1985, Izrael recorded its second album, Nabij faję (Fill up the pipe). Almost all songs were written by Brylewski, who also created its cover. The album was recorded in Poznań, due to band's cooperation with PolJazz publishing house. Soon afterwards, Brylewski co-produced Fala, a compilation album: "These were times full of naivety, times without divisions, as the Church and Solidarity were one front. We were young and inexperienced, we did not know that in times of threat everything looked different than in times of peace". (page 248).

== 1985 – 1990 ==
The Jarocin Festival in 1984 was marked by performances of two bands, Izrael and Siekiera. After Siekiera's show, Brylewski went to talk to members of the band, later inviting Siekiera to Warsaw's Róbrege Festival. Soon afterwards Brylewski noticed that Siekiera's leaders, Tomasz Adamski and Tomasz Budzyński did not get along well, and at some point Budzyński suggested starting a band with Brylewski. Thus Armia (also called Antiarmia) was created, together with Sławomir Gołaszewski, Brygada Kryzys drummer Janusz Rołt, and Izrael's bassists Tomasz Żmijewski and Alik Dziki. As Brylewski said in the autobiography: "At first Armia was a refreshing new idea, the return to my roots. This music was free from any schools and styles, we used sounds and chords that were not played by regular musicians (...) Our sound was like a thick, concrete wall, with maximum energy. Main point was not to play any guitar solos, as we ran away from rock. We had an impression that we no longer chased the West, it was Western musicians who had to keep up with us". (pages 253 – 254).

Together with Budzyński, Robert Brylewski was at that time impressed with Aguirre, the Wrath of God (this film influenced Armia's lyrics), books of John Ronald Reuel Tolkien, Native American culture and Christianity. As he says, first Armia's recordings of 1985 showed that the band already had a plan for its sound: "After the first single, it was obvious that Armia would create its own world, like Izrael did. We played what we called "a fairy tale music" (...) I associated Armia with forces of nature (...) I do not remember how Indians appeared in the band. I guess we all had in minds the notion of noble Winnetou, so Indian symbols dominated in our graphic designs". (pages 259 – 262)

In 1987, Armia recorded its first LP, Aguirre, at one of the first Polish private studios in Rzeszów. Since Izrael and Deuter also recorded their LPs there, Brylewski, who continued to be a member of Izrael, altogether spent two months in Rzeszów, having been arrested there twice. Apart from Aguirre, Brylewski recorded another Izrael's LP, Duchowa rewolucja, cooperating closely with Dariusz Malejonek, who had previously been leader of another reggae band, Kultura. At 1985 Jarocin Festival, Izrael and Kultura merged, keeping the name Izrael.

For most of the 1980s, all Brylewski's bands practiced at the Hybrydy Student Culture Center in Warsaw. In 1983 the club began to organize the annual Róbrege Festival, and Brylewski, together with Rozwadowski were responsible for the selection of bands: "The rule was that on the first day of the festival, punk rock bands were presented. On the second day – reggae, on the third day – different music genres. Bands were recommended to us from different people, so the guys from Dezerter suggested Kortatu (...) Róbrege always took place in the autumn, after the Jarocin Festivals, where we got in touch with people, listened to bands". (page 279)

In the mid-1980s Brylewski opened his own recording studio Złota Skała (Gold Rock), issuing first Armia's tapes in 1986. Since most underground bands in Communist Poland were unable to have their songs published by official companies, Brylewski decided to help them, recording and then publishing their work. At the same time, together with Rozwadowski, he created a music project T-34, named after a famous Soviet tank. In 1988, Brylewski went to London, as he stated: "because I wanted to see this city and buy a good guitar" (page 289). For two months he worked at a construction site, living in the district of Brixton. After coming back to Poland, he left Warsaw and with family moved to the village of Stanclewo, located in historic province of Masuria. Together with other musicians, he opened there the Gold Rock studio, and stayed at Stanclewo for two years (1988–1990): "More and more often I remained at Stanclewo, only with wife and children, which was troublesome. Without the band, I had little to do there. At that time communication was difficult, but still I was the last of those settlers, who gave up, only after Izrael's practices in Warsaw began to take place without me". (pages 312 – 313)

== Death ==
In 2018, Robert Brylewski had suffered a serious injury from assault and fallen into a coma. He died on 3 June that year; he was 57 years old.

== Other ==
- Robert Brylewski, Kryzys w Babilonie. Autobiografia, rozmawia Rafał Księżyk. Wydawnictwo Literackie Kraków, 2012. ISBN 978-83-08-04907-5
