= Siekiera =

Polish post-punk band

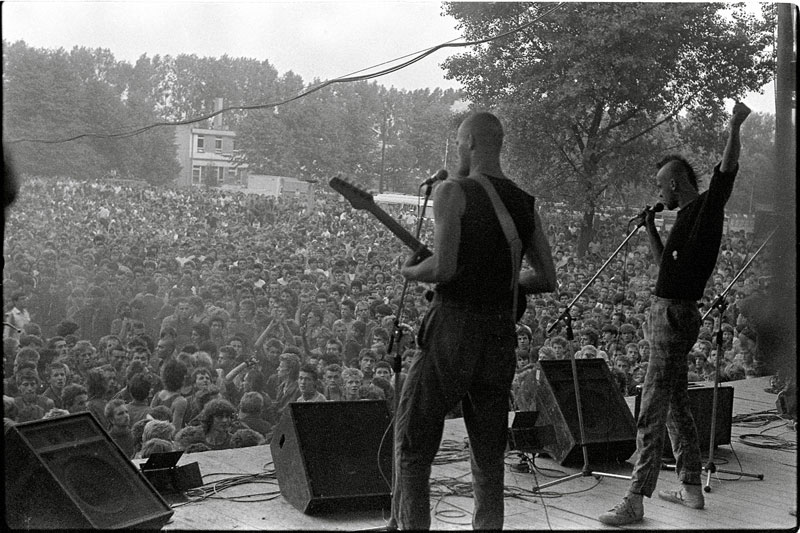
- Siekiera at Jarocin Festival in 1984

Background information
- Origin: Puławy, Poland
- Genres: Post-punk, hardcore punk, cold wave, new wave
- Years active: 1984–1988
- Labels: Tonpress, Manufaktura Legenda
- Members: Tomasz "Dzwon" Adamski; Zbigniew Musiński; Paweł Młynarczyk; Dariusz "Malina" Malinowski; Wiesław Borsewicz
- Past members: Piotr Szewczyk; Tomasz "Budzy" Budzyński; Krzysztof "Koben" Grela
- Website: http://siekiera.serpent.pl/

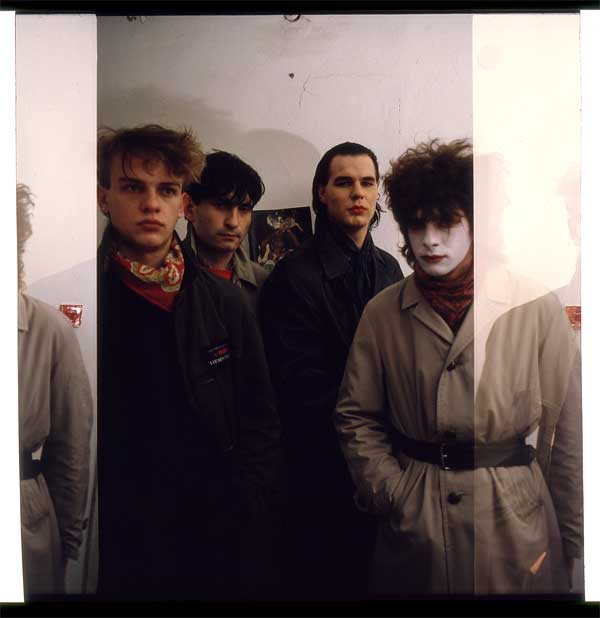
Lineup 1985/1986 - the "Nowa Aleksandria" - era.

Siekiera (Polish for "Axe") was a Polish post-punk band. With fast, aggressive music and lyrics filled with obscenities, the band was a sensation at the 1984 Jarocin Festival. After lineup changes, the band switched to new wave and then dissolved in 1988.

== Career ==
Siekiera formed in 1982 or 1983 in Puławy, Poland, under the name of "Trafo". The original line-up consisted of guitarist Tomasz Adamski, vocalist Tomasz Budzyński, bass player Jerzy Janaczek, and drummer Irek "Borys" Czerniak. They started by playing cover songs of UK Subs and The Exploited. In the autumn of 1983 they changed their name to Siekiera (Polish for "Axe"). The original line-up was Tomasz Adamski (a.k.a. Dzwon) - guitar, leader, the author of all lyrics and music, Tomasz Budzyński (a.k.a. Budzy) - vocals, Dariusz Malinowski (a.k.a. Malina) - bass, and Krzysztof Grela (a.k.a. Koben) - drums.

In 1984 they played their first official show in a club "Remont" in Warsaw. They also performed at the Jarocin Festival, and they were well received by the audience. In October 1984, after a performance with TZN Xenna and Youth Brigade, Budzynski left the band following a dispute with Adamski over control in lyric writing. With that line-up they played only 6 shows. After that Budzynski formed a band called Armia (with Robert Brylewski).

Tomasz Adamski reformed Siekiera with two new members: Zbigniew Musinski - drums and Pawel Mlynarczyk - keyboards. Dariusz Malinowski took the vocal duties (besides playing bass). In February 1985 they recorded eight new tracks, some of them were played on the radio. In May and June they recorded some songs for an EP and the Jak Punk to Punk compilation LP. In 1985 they played again at the Jarocin festival, but the orthodox punk public did not like their new wave image and music.

In 1986 Siekiera released their only LP, Nowa Aleksandria - it is influenced mainly by Killing Joke and regarded as one of the greatest Polish albums of all time. In 1987, a new guitarist, Wieslaw Borysewicz, was recruited, and Tomasz Adamski concentrated on singing. In 1987 they also played a mini-tour with Variete, a Polish new wave band. Finally, in 1988 they broke up. They were expected to re-form in 1989 with an almost original line up (with Stopa who used to play in Moskwa and Armia as the drummer), but somehow it did not work out.

== After Siekiera ==
Tomasz Adamski's interests shifted towards classical music, particularly J.S. Bach. A published poet, he lives in Puławy. Tomasz Budzyński is still Armia's vocalist and also plays with a Christian band 2Tm2,3. He recently started performing solo, and his music and lyrics have nothing in common with punk now. Dariusz Malinowski was a member of a band known as Tra-band. Malinowski died on 12 December, 2020. Zbigniew Musinski currently resides in Germany. Krzysztof Grela was killed in a pub in Puławy in January 1992.

In 2014, the Polish black metal band Behemoth, covered Siekiera's track "Ludzie Wschodu", on the Australian version of their album The Satanist.

In January 2017, the Polish band Drivealone played a full cover concert of Siekiera's album Nowa Aleksandria at Dom Chemika in Puławy.

== Discography ==
- Demo bootleg (1984)
- Fala / Idzie wojna LP Fala (Tonpress 1985)
- Jest bezpiecznie / Misiowie puszyści (Tonpress 1986)
- Nowa Aleksandria (Tonpress 1986)
- Ja stoję, ja tańczę, ja walczę / Ludzie wschodu LP Jak punk to punk (Tonpress 1988)
- Na Wszystkich Frontach Świata CD (Manufaktura Legenda 2008) (slightly remastered recordings from the punk period)
- 1984 LP (Manufaktura Legenda 2008) extra records from punk period-one of last rehearsals with Tomasz Budzynski and Krzysztof Grala in squad. Limited edition.
