= Brygada Kryzys (album) =

Studio album by Brygada Kryzys
- Released: 1982
- Recorded: 1982 at Tonpress KAW Studio, Warsaw, Poland
- Genre: Punk rock, post-punk, new wave, reggae
- Length: 36:25
- Label: Tonpress

Brygada Kryzys chronology
Brygada Kryzys Live (1982)	Brygada Kryzys (1982)	Cosmopolis (1992)

Brygada Kryzys is the debut studio album by Polish band Brygada Kryzys. It was released in 1982, through the record label Tonpress.

== Track listing ==
All lyrics are written by Tomasz Lipiński; all music is composed by Robert Brylewski.

No.	Title	Length
1.	"Centrala" (eng: Headquarters)	5:55
2.	"Radioaktywny blok" (eng: Radioactive Tower Block)	1:00
3.	"Nie ma nic" (eng: There is Nothing)	4:46
4.	"Przestań śnić" (eng: Stop Dreaming)	6:30
5.	"The Real One"	3:21
6.	"Travelling Stranger"	3:53
7.	"Except One"	2:24
8.	"Ganja"	3:13
9.	"Fallen, Fallen is Babylon"	5:23
Total length:		36:25

== Personnel ==
- Tomasz Lipiński – vocal, guitar
- Robert Brylewski – guitar
- Ireneusz Wereński – bass guitar
- Janusz Rołt – drums
- Jarosław Ptasiński – drums
- Tomasz Świtalski – saxophone
