= 2Tm2,3 =

Polish Christian music band

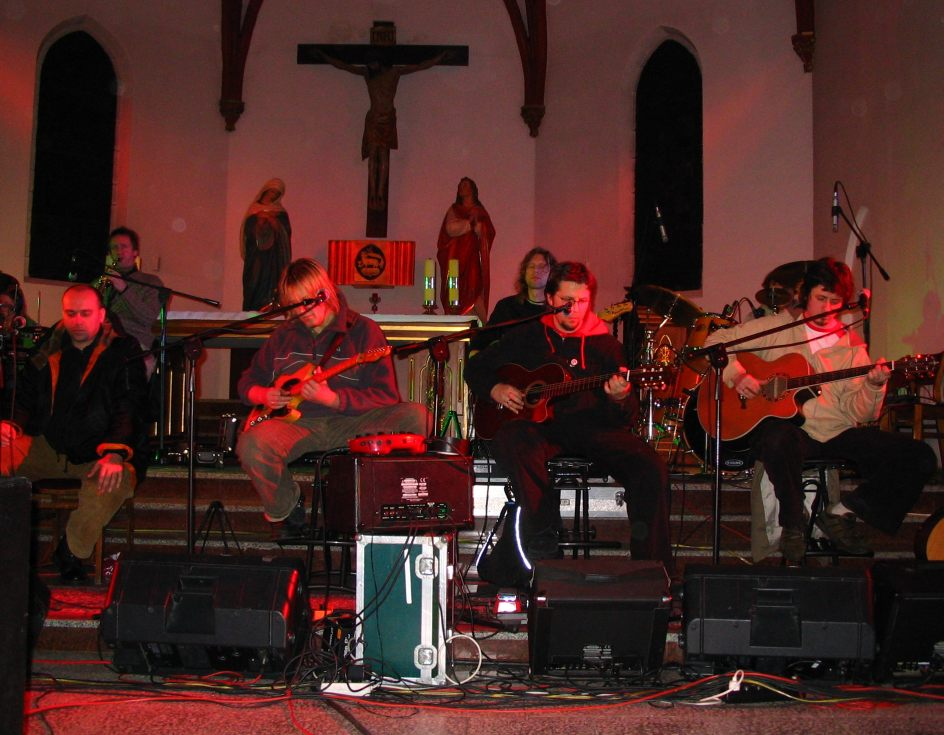
- 2Tm2,3 in 2004

Background information
- Also known as: Tymoteusz
- Origin: Poland
- Genres: Heavy metal, Christian rock, Christian metal, hardcore punk, folk rock, reggae
- Years active: 1996–present
- Label: Metal Mind Productions
- Spinoff of: Acid Drinkers; Flapjack; Armia; Houk
- Members: Angelika Korszyńska-Górny; Tomasz Budzyński; Mateusz Pospieszalski; Marcin Pospieszalski; Dariusz Malejonek; Robert Friedrich; Robert Drężek; Krzysztof Kmiecik; Mikołaj Pawlak; Beata Polak; Piotr Żyżelewicz; Joszko Broda
- Website: 2tm23.art.pl

2Tm2,3 (nicknamed Tymoteusz) is a Polish Christian music band founded in 1996 by members of Polish top heavy metal and alternative music bands: Acid Drinkers, Flapjack, Armia, Houk. The name comes from 2 Timothy 2:3. The band performs a range of styles from metal to punk to reggae to indie rock.

== Discography ==
=== Studio albums ===
| Title | Album details | Peak chart positions |
| Title | Album details | POL |
|---|---|---|
| Przyjdź | Released: 17 March 1997; Label: Metal Mind Productions; Formats: CD, CS | — |
| 2Tm2,3 | Released: 6 September 1999; Label: Metal Mind Productions; Formats: CD, CS | — |
| Pascha 2000 | Released: 27 April 2000; Label: Metal Mind Productions; Formats: CD | — |
| Propaganda Dei | Released: 28 May 2004; Label: Metal Mind Productions; Formats: CD | — |
| 888 | Released: 13 September 2006; Label: Metal Mind Productions; Formats: CD | 30 |
| dementi | Released: 10 March 2008; Label: Metal Mind Productions; Formats: CD | 25 |
| Svrsvm Corda | Released: February 24, 2024; Label: Stage Diving Club; Format: CD | |
"—" denotes a recording that did not chart or was not released in that territory.

=== Live albums ===
| Title | Album details |
|---|---|
| Koncert w teatrze | Released: 20 April 2009; Label: Metal Mind Productions; Formats: CD |

=== Remix albums ===
| Title | Album details |
|---|---|
| Pascha 2000 Tour | Released: 28 October 2000; Label: Metal Mind Productions; Formats: CD |

=== Video albums ===
| Title | Album details |
|---|---|
| Koncert | Released: 23 January 2006; Label: Metal Mind Productions; Formats: DVD |
