= Kryzys =

Polish rock band

- Also known as: The Boors
- Origin: Warsaw, Poland
- Genres: Post-punk
- Years active: 1978–1981, 2006, 2008–present
- Labels: Blitzkrieg Records, Polton, Gold Rock, W Moich Oczach

Kryzys is a Polish rock band regarded as pioneers of Polish punk rock. The origins of Kryzys go back to 1978, when the Warsaw punk rock ensemble The Boors was started by Robert Brylewski (g., voc.), Piotr Mrowiński (g.), Marek Iwańczuk (bg., later replaced by Ireneusz Wereński) and Kamil Stoor (dr.), who was replaced in January 1980 by Maciej "Magura" Góralski - poet, drummer. In May 1979, the band changed the name into Kryzys ('Crisis'), which was suggested by Brylewski. Under their new name, they performed at the legendary First All-Polish Review of the New Wave, in early August 1980 at Kołobrzeg. Soon afterwards, due to contacts of manager Jacek Olechowski (the brother of Andrzej Olechowski), Kryzys played a tour of Upper Silesia and Zagłębie Dąbrowskie (11 shows, together with Exodus, Turbo and Fantom), and Pomerelia (9 shows, together with Stalowy Bagaż and Izabela Trojanowska).

With new singer, Mirosław Szatkowski, Kryzys performed at the 1981 National Festival of Polish Song in Opole, at the 1980 Music of the Young Generation Festival in Sopot, and at the 1981 Pop Session, also in Sopot (together with De Press). In the spring 1981, without the knowledge of the band, a French recording house Blitzkrieg Records issued an album entitled Solidarite avec le rock polonais, with songs of Kryzys and another underground band from Warsaw, Deadlock. Kryzys was dissolved in July 1981, after several shows which took place at a Warsaw's Intersalto Circus tent. A few weeks later, Robert Brylewski and Tomasz Lipiński founded Brygada Kryzys.

Kryzys returned in March 2006, when a concert of the reactivated band took place in Warsaw. In the summer 2008, the band performed at the Jarocin Festival, and in spring 2010, a Kryzys komunizmu album was published. Currently, the lineup of Kryzys consists of Robert Brylewski (g., voc.), Maciej Góralski (dr.), Aleksander Korecki (sax.), Martyna Załoga (bg.), Andrzej Kasprzyk (g.)

== Legacy ==
Kryzys is regarded as one of the most influential new wave bands in Poland. In 1985, its song Mam dość was issued at a Fala compilation album. In 1994, a Kryzys 78 - 81 LP was published, featuring songs of the early years of the band. In 2003 - 2006, two tribute albums were published: Dolina Lalek: Tribute to Kryzys vol. 1. and Dolina Lalek: Tribute to Kryzys vol. 2, in which the songs of the band are played by, among others, Dezerter, Pidżama Porno, T.Love, and Farben Lehre. Songs of Kryzys, with lyrics written by Magura Maciej Góralski.

== Members ==
- Robert Brylewski – voc., g. (1979–1981; 2006; since 2008)
- Piotr "Mrówa" Mrowiński – g. (1979–1981; 2006; 2008)
- Marek Iwańczuk – bg. (1979–1980; 2006; 2008)
- Kamil Stoor – dr. (1979)
- Maciej "Magura" Góralski – dr. (1980–1981; 2006; since 2008)
- Tomasz "Man" Świtalski – sax. (1979–1981; 2006; 2008)
- Mirek "Szymon" Szatkowski – voc. (1980–1981)
- Ireneusz Wereński – bg. (1980–1981)
- Aleksander Korecki – sax. (since 2008)
- Martyna Załoga – bg. (since 2008)
- Andrzej "LAL" Kasprzyk – g., keyboard (since 2008)

== Discography ==
| Title | Album details | Peak chart positions |
| Title | Album details | POL |
|---|---|---|
| Kryzys | Released: 1981; Label: Blitzkrieg Records; Formats: LP | — |
| 78-81 | Released: September 19, 1994; Label: Gold Rock; Formats: CS | — |
| Kryzys komunizmu | Released: May 24, 2010; Label: Songood House/EMI Music Poland; Formats: CD | 19 |
"—" denotes a recording that did not chart or was not released in that territory.
