= Brygada Kryzys =

Polish band

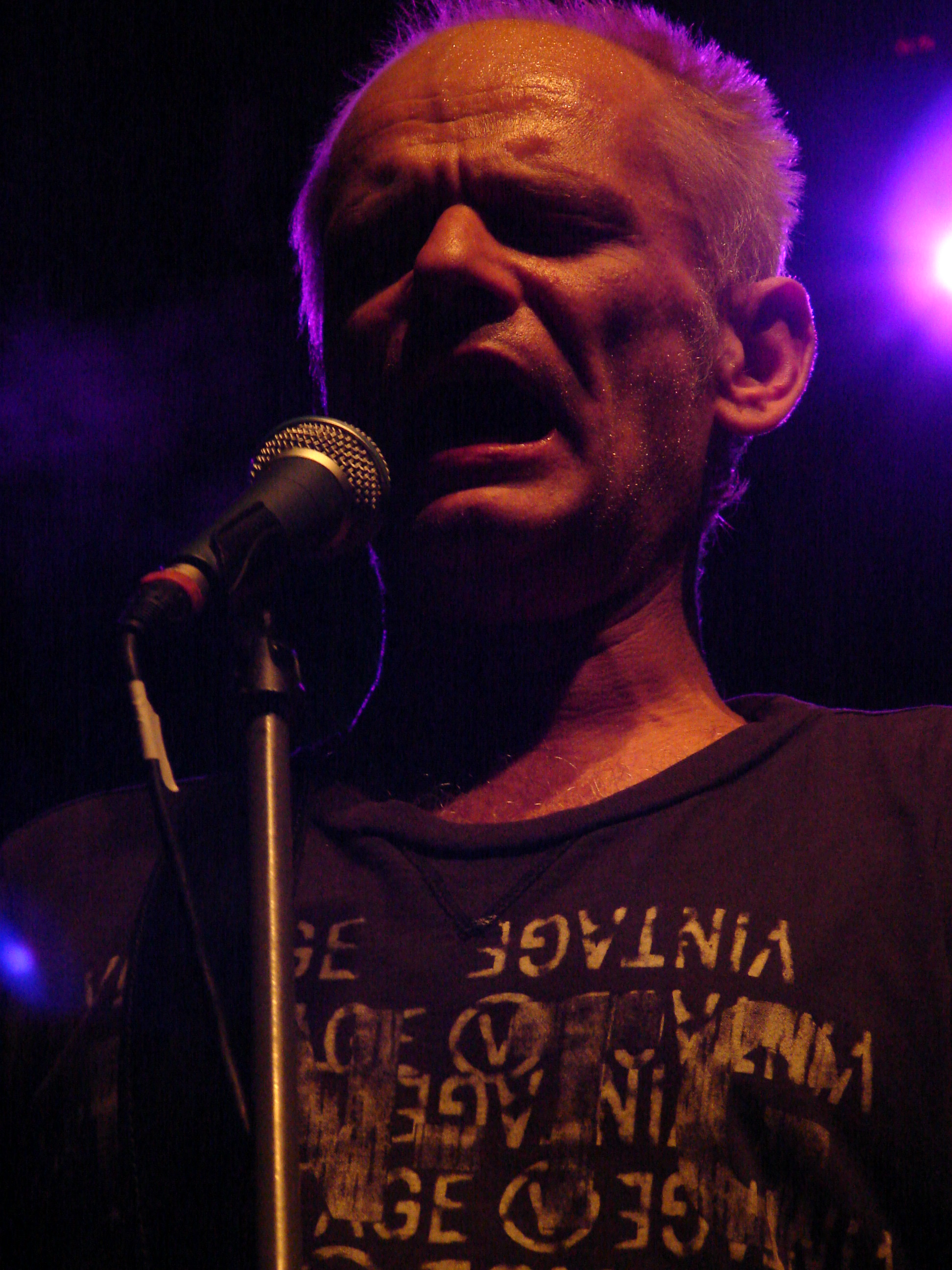
Robert Brylewski.

Brygada Kryzys ('Crisis Brigade') (Polish pronunciation: [brɨˈɡada ˈkrɨzɨs]) was one of the most important and influential Polish post-punk bands. The band was founded in 1981 by two well-known guitarist/vocalists from Warsaw, Robert Brylewski (formerly of the band Kryzys) and Tomasz Lipiński (from Tilt).

== Timeline ==
=== 1981 ===
- July - Robert Brylewski asks Tomasz Lipiński if he would be willing to start a new band. Lipiński agrees.
- August - Brygada Kryzys is formed. After few rehearsals the lineup consists of: Brylewski, Lipiński, Jarek "Gruszka" Ptasiński (drums), Tomek "Men" Świtalski (sax), Ireneusz "Jeżyk" Wereński (bass), and Sławek Słocinski (drums). The musicians describe their music as "punkadelic", claiming they have two sources of inspiration: early punk and the psychedelic 1960s. The first planned gig in Gdansk is canceled because its organizers regard BK's message as too political.
- September - First concert in Warsaw's Riviera. This gig is recorded and later issued in London as a bootleg.
- November - A two-week tour around Poland with British band TV 21. At the Monopol Hotel in Gdańsk, Brylewski is severely beaten by a group of hooligans and the milicja (communist police) refuse to help. A general strike in Poland begins around the same time.
- December - The band goes to Belgrade to participate in a festival titled "Days of Young Polish Subculture." The bus, however, is stopped at the Polish-Czechoslovak border and the band's equipment is confiscated. BK eventually reaches Belgrade by plane and plays two shows. One is recorded. After its return to Poland the group plans a tour of the Netherlands for February 1982, as well as another trip to Yugoslavia. On December 13 the communist authorities declare martial law, instituting both a curfew and severe travel restrictions.

=== 1982 ===
- February - Posters in Warsaw for a new band, “Brygada K.” start to appear. The government wants the band to shorten its provocative name ("Crisis Brigade" in English), but the musicians refuse. As a result, BK is banned from playing any public concerts, and is not allowed to leave the country for its planned Netherlands tour.
- March - The recording company “Tonpress” opens a new studio in Warsaw's Wawrzyszew district and begins looking for a band to test it. BK manager, Jacek Olechowski, suggests the group. Over a few days and several songs are recorded. “Tonpress”, with hesitation, agrees to publish the record. Also, Janek Rołt becomes BK's new drummer.
- Summer - The band spends the whole of the summer in a village near Lublin. Several scenes are recorded and later appear in the movie “Koncert”.
- August 31 - Demonstrations and street fights in Warsaw. Tomek is severely beaten and arrested by the milicja, but is released shortly afterwards as there is no space in the overcrowded jails.
- September 1–4 - Concerts at Warsaw's club Remont, the first since December 1981. BK members decide to dissolve the band due to the numerous political obstacles which make it impossible to carry on. Robert starts a reggae band, Izrael, while Tomek returns to Tilt.

=== 1989 ===
A week before the Berlin Wall's collapse, on the way to a Berlin concert, Tomek and Robert talk about reforming BK.

=== 1991 ===
- August - The band plays its first concert in nine years at the legendary Jarocin Festival, to a great reception.
- October 1991-August 1992 - At the Izabelin studio the band records the new album “Cosmopolis”. The LP features both old and new songs. BK now consists of: Robert Brylewski, Tomek Lipiński, Irek Jeżyk Wereński and new musicians Piotr "Stopa" Żyżelewicz (drums), Brylewski's wife Vivian Quarcoo (vocals), and both Włodek Kiniorski and Aleksander Korecki on saxophone.
- December 13, 1992, 1993, 1994 - The band organizes a series of concerts commemorating the declaration of martial law in Poland. One of them is later released. In 1994 the band again disbands.

=== 2003 ===
In the spring BK returns again, after 10 years, with: Robert Brylewski and Tomek Lipiński, plus Filip Gałązka on drums, Tomek Szymborski on bass and Sergiusz Lisecki on sax. The band plays several concerts, including a tour titled "PRL czyli Punk Rock Later". In December BK plays at the Garage Club in London.

=== 2005 ===
With Aleksander Korecki back replacing Lisecki on saxophone, BK begin work on the "Black Album" project, featuring remixes of the self-titled first album, songs by Jozef B. Nowakowski and some early unreleased recordings. They participate in TVP3's program Muzyka łączy pokolenia ("Music Connects Generations") with the rap duo "Vienio i Pele". Another tour commences in November through clubs in Poland and on (December 4) the band again plays at the Garage in London. A new recording session is scheduled for winter 2005/2006.

== Discography ==
- 1982 Brygada Kryzys / LP Tonpress
- 1982 Live / LP Fresh Records UK
- 1992 Cosmopolis / Izabelin Studio
- 1996 Live in Remont '93 / MC Gold Rock Studio
