= Dezerter =

Polish punk band

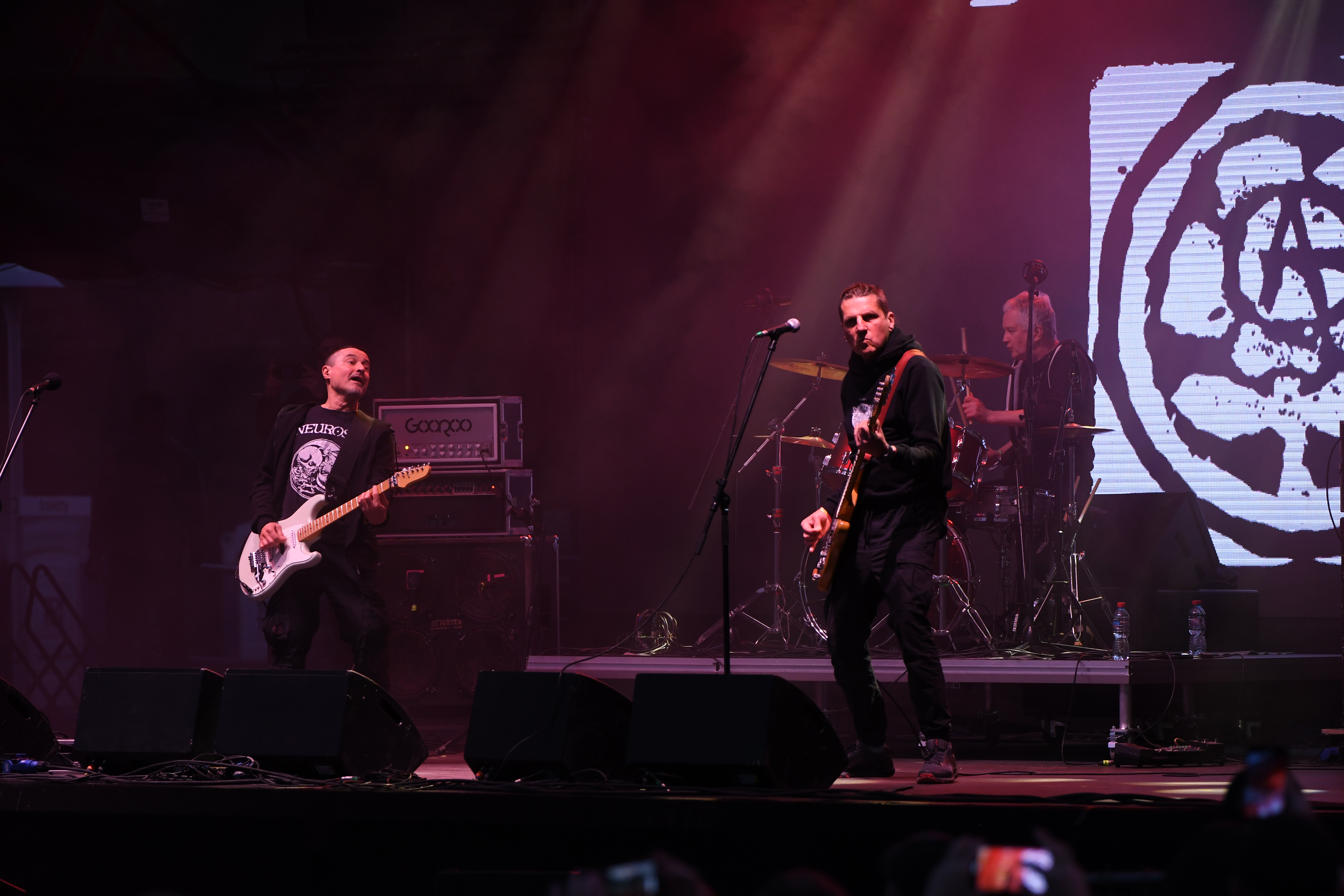
- Dezerter in 2023

Background information
- Also known as: SS-20
- Origin: Warsaw, Poland
- Genre: Hardcore punk
- Years active: 1981–present
- Labels: Metal Mind Productions, Tonpress, Maximum Rock'n'roll, QQRYQ Productions, Polton/Warner Music Poland, Izabelin Studio, Silverton, Tank Records
- Members: Robert Matera (1981 - ) Krzysztof Grabowski (1981 - ) Jacek Chrzanowski (2000 - )
- Past members: Dariusz Stepnowski (1981 - 1985); Dariusz Hajn (1981 - 1986); Rafał Kwaśniewski (1987); Paweł Piotrowski (1985 - 1993); Tomasz Lewandowski (1994 - 1999)
- Website: www.dezerter.most.org.pl

Dezerter, founded as SS-20 in May 1981 in Warsaw, is one of the most popular punk bands from Poland. The band was founded by three students of Warsaw's vocational high school (technikum) - Robert "Robal" Matera (guitar), Krzysztof Grabowski (drums), and Dariusz "Stepa" Stepnowski (bass). All three were born in 1963, and went to the same class. From the beginning Grabowski wrote lyrics, and Matera music. The three classmates originally planned to name their band Sektor A, but after some time changed their minds and named it SS-20. Soon afterwards, they were joined by another student of the same school, Dariusz "Skandal" Hajn (voc., born 1965), who, as Grabowski later stated, "looked like a real punkrocker". The band started regular rehearsals in the summer of 1981. With fast guitar riffs and intelligent lyrics written by Grabowski, Dezerter's concerts drew thousands of fans and its LPs were very popular, especially in the late 1980s and early 1990s.

The most famous Dezerter's live appearance took place during the 1984 Jarocin Festival in Jarocin, Poland and it was attended by some 20,000 people. The concert was recorded and later parts of it were released (together with four songs from the 7″ EP recorded in 1983) on the LP Underground Out of Poland. The LP was produced by Joey Shithead, vocalist of Canadian band D.O.A. Dezerter however is not widely known in other countries, perhaps because the band refrains from singing in the English language. Nevertheless, it played in several European countries, as well as Japan and the U.S. (in New York City and Chicago, early November 2009, commemorating the 20th anniversary of the fall of the Berlin Wall). In 2010, Grabowski's memoirs "Dezerter, poroniona generacja?" ("Dezerter, aborted generation?") were published in Warsaw.

== 1981 - 1990 ==
SS-20 debuted during the Mokotów Autumn Music Festival, in November 1981. In the spring of 1982 the band played at the Rail Worker House of Culture in Warsaw's district of Praga, but the show was ended halfway when management of the house disconnected electricity. Soon afterwards, SS-20 went for its first concert outside of Warsaw. It took place in Toruń, at the Od Nowa Club. In early summer 1982, SS-20 recorded a tape and sent it to the management of the Jarocin Festival. To the surprise of band's members, it was qualified to perform. The August 1982 Jarocin show was filmed by Polish TV (see YouTube video of Dezerter at Jarocin 1982:), and by film director Paweł Karpiński. SS-20 became famous, and the band appeared in such films, as "Być człowiekiem", "Film o pankach", and "To tylko rock" (see YouTube video of Dezerter from the 1983 "Film o pankach").

In September 1982, the band had to change the name to Dezerter because of the reaction of the Communist authorities (SS-20 was a NATO reporting name of a Soviet ballistic missile, and this name was regarded too provocative by the government). To become less recognizable by the regime, they often changed the name in posters, sometimes spelled as "De-zerter", sometimes as "The Zerter" - it was a cheap and efficient trick to cheat the regime. At first, the band practiced at a Culture House in Nieporęt, moving in the late summer of 1983 to the Dziekanka Student Club in Warsaw. First show under the name Dezerter took place on September 15, 1982 at Warsaw's Riviera Remont Student Club. In mid-November 1982, already under the name Dezerter, and together with other Polish punk rock bands (TZN Xenna and Deuter), it went on a tour across southeastern corner of the country. The tour was named "Rock Galicja", and featured shows in Rzeszów, Krosno, Sanok, and Mielec. After coming back to Warsaw, band's members had problems at their high school, since they missed several school days.

In the summer of 1983, with help of Polish Radio reporter Marek Wiernik, Dezerter recorded a four-song 7″ EP, Ku przyszłości (Into the future) also known as Spytaj milicjanta (Ask a militiaman). Before recording, which took place at the state company Tonpress in Warsaw's district of Wawrzyszew, the band provided a list of 12 songs, and Communist censorship office allowed four of them - Spytaj milicjanta, Ku przyszłości, Szara rzeczywistość (Drab reality), and Wojna głupców (War of fools). The record was issued by Tonpress, and was very warmly welcomed by fans, with 50,000 copies sold. Members of the band distributed it to several fanzines and activists in the West, including Maximumrocknroll, in which a positive review was published. As a result, Dezerter became a recognized punk rock band.

In the first half of 1984 the band moved to University of Warsaw Student Club Hybrydy, where it prepared for the Jarocin Festival. The 1984 festival took place in early August, and Dezerter's show, recorded and later published as Jeszcze żywy człowiek (Still living man), turned out to be one of the main events of the festival. The band prepared all their best songs, and during the frequent breaks, Skandal and Stepa would read excerpts from popular Polish comic books, such as Hans Kloss. Furthermore, at one point the band requested firefighters, who were present at the stadium with their trucks, to water the dry grass, as there were clouds of dust in the air, caused by the pogo. The organizers refused to do so, and the show was interrupted several times, as the situation almost got out of control, with the threat of a riot. After the show, the band argued with the organizer of the festival, Walter Chełstowski, and as a result, Dezerter was not allowed to perform at the Jarocin Festival until 1987.

In the fall of 1984, after a concert at Warsaw's Hybrydy, the band met a man named Maciej Chmiel, who became Dezerter's manager. Soon afterwards, band's members, for the money received as royalties from Tonpress for its EP, purchased a tape recorder at a Pewex store, opening its own illegal publishing company, Tank Records. First release was Dezerter's Jarocin 1984 show, issued as Jeszcze żywy człowiek (Still living man), which years later came out as a CD. In early 1985 Dezerter attempted to perform in Jugoslavia, but Communist government of Poland refused to grant passports to the members of the band. In December 1985, Canadian punk rock band D.O.A. performed at Warsaw's Riviera Remont. After the show, the Canadians met with Dezerter, and Joey Shithead offered to take band's recordings to North America, to try to publish them. The Underground Out of Poland, based on material handed over to Shithead, was released in 1987 by Maximumrocknroll. Originally, as Grabowski claims, the album was planned to be released by Jello Biafra's Alternative Tentacles, but it didn't happen due to Biafra's legal problems with the poster in the record sleeve of his Frankenchrist album. According to Grabowski, Dezerter sent its own cover design for the Underground Out of Poland album, but Maximumrockandroll chose their design. Furthermore, the Americans changed the name of the album, as Grabowski wanted to name it Greatest sHits.

In the fall of 1985 Dezerter's bassist Dariusz "Stepa" Stepnowski was drafted into the People's Army of Poland, and the last show with band's original lineup took place at Warsaw's Róbrege Festival in late summer 1985. Soon afterwards, Stepnowski was replaced by Paweł Piotrowski. With Stepa's disappearance, the Tank Records was closed. Last tape published by the company was Izolacja (Isolation), Dezerter Live 1985 at the Hybrydy. It came out in early 1986, and at the same time, Dezerter's charismatic lead singer, Dariusz "Skandal" Hajn began to skip practices, due to his budding Polish heroin addiction. Finally, in mid-1986 Skandal did not go to a show at Szczecin, without explaining the reason for it. From then on, Dezerter turned into a trio, with Robal both playing the guitar and singing. Before that happened, Dezerter's songs appeared on two compilation albums, Fala (Wave) (1985), and Jak punk to punk (If it is punk, then it is punk) (1986).

In late 1986, Dezerter suspended its concert activities, due to several reasons, one of which was the emergence of skinheads. Furthermore, the band had to travel to its concerts by train, which was dangerous and time-consuming, especially at locations far away from Warsaw. At that time, Dezerter again turned into a four-member band, with Rafał Kwaśniewski as second guitarist. Kwaśniewski, however, did not play with the band for long, quitting in late 1987. On June 1, 1987, Dezerter began recording its first Longplay, at a studio located in Warsaw's district of Wawrzyszew. Even though Skandal and Stepa were no longer with the band, both were invited to record a song. The circulation of the LP was originally limited to only 5,000 copies. The band wanted to name it Kolaboracja (Collaboration), but the censorship office did not give permission for it. The album was finally issued in the spring of 1988, under the name Dezerter (in the subsequent issues, the name Kolaboracja was used). In August 1987, Dezerter performed at the Jarocin Festival, due to the fact that festival's manager Walter Chełstowski had been replaced by Marcin Jacobson. Soon after Jarocin, the Róbrege Festival was organized in Warsaw (late summer 1987). Dezerter prepared a special show, inviting artists from the Totart Group from Gdańsk.

On December 10, 1987 Dezerter for the first time in its history left Poland, and went by ferry to Finland, on invitation of Anarchist Collective Vox Populi from Helsinki. A few months later, in the spring of 1988, the band went to Kiev, which at that time belonged to the Soviet Union. The concert, which took place at an amphitheater in Kiev, was cancelled after a few songs, because, as the organizers explained, "it already was 10 p.m.". In May 1988, the band went to a Polish Radio studio in Opole, where it recorded its second Polish album, Kolaboracja II. Once again, the censorship changed the title of the LP to Dezerter. In December 1988, Dezerter, which due to the Underground Out of Poland album already was a band well-recognized in the West, went by train on a tour of West Germany, and in May 1989, again to West Germany, as well as France and Switzerland. Finally, after a 16-month break, Dezerter once again performed in Poland (December 14, 1989 at Warsaw's Hybrydy Student Club).

== 1990 - 2000 ==
In mid-1989, Dezerter began working on material for a new album. In January 1990, at a studio in Wawrzyszew, recording of the LP Wszyscy przeciwko wszystkim (Everyone Against Everything) started. Most of the songs were new, except for Pałac (Palace) and Jutro (Tomorrow), which had been written in the mid-1980s, but were not allowed to be officially published. Furthermore, the LP included a song Panie Ty nasz (Our Lord), which is a cover of De Press (with the permission of Andrzej Dziubek, in exchange for a glass of wine, as Dziubek wrote on February 8, 1990). After recording, in April 1990, Dezerter went on a two-month tour of Switzerland, France, Germany and Holland (30 concerts, mostly at clubs and squats). Among bands that played with the Poles were Carcass (at Amsterdam's Melkweg), The Ex, Dog Faced Hermans, and Citizen Fish (in Paris; after the show both bands played a football game).

A few days after returning to Poland (June 1990), Dezerter went to Frankfurt Airport, from where it flew to Tokyo, on invitation of Michiro Endo of The Stalin, a renowned Japanese punk rock band. Together with The Stalin, Polish rockers performed at Kawasaki (two shows), Nagoya, and Osaka. Both Kawasaki shows were recorded and five songs were later included in the CD Wszyscy przeciwko wszystkim, published in 1991. In exchange, Dezerter's manager Maciej Chmiel invited The Stalin for the 1990 Jarocin Festival, which took place in August of that year. Chmiel himself resigned from his post of band's manager in late 1990. In February 1991 Dezerter went on a concert to Gryfino. On the way back, a car accident took place on icy road near Łomża, after which both Matera and Grabowski ended up in hospital, with broken clavicles. As a result, the band ceased to perform for a few months.

In late 1991 the band began working on a new album, Blasfemia (Blasphemy), which was recorded in 1992 at the Izabelin Studio. Together with the LP, Dezerter's first ever videoclip was made, for the Pierwszy raz (First time) song (see the clip at YouTube). With new manager, Piotr "Pietia" Wierzbicki", Dezerter frequently performed across Poland in the first half of the 1990s. In spring 1992, the band once again left for Western Europe, performing in Hamburg and Scandinavia, together with Disorder. One show took place at the Blitz in Oslo, together with Jingo de Lunch.

In 1993, together with Kasia Nosowska, Dezerter recorded new versions of its old songs Ku Przyszłości, Yugoslavia, Dla zysku (For profit) and Niewolnik (Slave). Together with other old songs, and the 1980s live recordings, they were published in the CD Jak powstrzymałem III wojnę światową, czyli nieznana historia Dezertera (How I Stopped World War Three, or Unknown History of Dezerter). In August 1993, Dezerter performed at the Energia Sztuki Festival, which took place near the site of the Żarnowiec Nuclear Power Plant (see YouTube video of Dezerter at the festival), and in the autumn of that year, the band went on a tour of England, which was cancelled after the musicians were not allowed entry into the United Kingdom, and returned from Dover back to the Continent. After that failure, Paweł Piotrowski left the band, which turned into a duet of Grabowski and Matera.

In the spring 1994 at the studio in Wawrzyszew, Grabowski and Matera recorded another album, Ile procent duszy? (What is the Percentage of the Soul?), with one song Facet (Guy, based on Big Man, Big M.a.n. by Crass) sung by Matera together with Dominika Domczyk of Post Regiment. After the release of the album, Dezerter was joined by a new bassist, Tomasz "Tony von Kinsky" Lewandowski. In 1994, a film documentary Dezerter, nie ma zagrożenia (Dezerter, There is No Threat) was released. It was directed by Paweł "Konjo" Konnak, and presents the history of the band, together with interviews with the musicians (see the film at YouTube). Furthermore, two videoclips for the songs Ostatnia chwila (Last Moment, see) and Nie ma zagrożenia (see) were made together with the film. On May 8, 1995, Dariusz "Skandal" Hajn, Dezerter's legendary singer died at the age of 30, and as Grabowski wrote in his book: "We found out about it probably during a rehearsal, when someone told us (...) He had been hurting himself for years, and it happened. Apparently it was the liver or the heart problem. Until now we do not know exactly what happened. All we know is that he had been reaching for different poisons. His organism was unable to stand it any longer". In the same year, at a studio in Sulejówek, Dezerter recorded another album, Deuter. The band was joined by Paweł "Kelner" Rozwadowski, and the album is a tribute to Deuter, a Warsaw punk rock band, popular in Poland in the early 1980s, of which Rozwadowski was the lead singer. All songs featured on the album were based on early Deuter recordings, and in the late 1995/early 1996 Dezerter played some 30 shows across Poland.

In late August 1996, Dezerter again entered the studio at Sulejówek, to record yet another album, Mam kły mam pazury (I Have Fangs, I Have Claws; the title was taken from an animal rights fanzine published in Grudziądz). It was released by Warner Music Poland, which had purchased Dezerter's publisher, Polton. Next album, Ziemia jest płaska (The Earth is Flat), was recorded in December 1997 - January 1998, and released in early spring 1998. Contrary to previous albums, it did not sell well. Furthermore, the number of shows was reduced, which was connected with a crisis of Poland's independent music. As a result, members of the band had to find jobs to make both ends meet, with Lewandowski leaving Poland for England. For the next two years, Dezerter remained in limbo.

== Since 2000 ==
In November 2000 at Warsaw's Proxima Club, Dezerter for the first time performed with a new bassist, Jacek Chrzanowski, who also plays for Hey. Furthermore, Hey's manager Krzysztof Dominik became Dezerter's manager. In early 2001, the band took part in a Holiday in the Snow tour, together with Post Regiment and Apatia. On June 5, 2001, Dezerter's new record Decydujące starcie (Decisive Clash) came out, published by Metal Mind Productions.

In April 2002, together with Kasia Nosowska, the band went on a tour of Holland, England, Belgium and Germany (altogether 6 shows). The three shows in England took place in London, Bradford and Birmingham, together with a French band La Fraction. Furthermore, at London Astoria Dezerter performed with Conflict, and other bands. After coming back to Poland, Dezerter began working on a new album, Nielegalny zabójca czasu (Illegal Killer of Time), which was recorded at a studio in Piaseczno, and released in 2004, again by Metal Mind Productions. In the summer of that year, Dezerter performed at the Przystanek Woodstock. The show was recorded and released on DVD in 2005.

In August 2005, the Jarocin Festival was brought back, after a few years' break. Dezerter performed there, and again in 2007. In the spring of 2006, the band went on a tour of Germany (Berlin, Bremen, Hamburg). In 2006, due to the anniversary of Dezerter's 25th years of existence, a double album Punk's Not Jazz was released, with band's most popular songs. In the late 2000s, Dezerter's songs were presented in three Polish films, Dom zły, Wszystko, co kocham, and Beats of Freedom. In June 2010, Mystic Production released band's another album, Prawo do bycia idiotą (The right to be an Idiot).

== Members ==
- Robert "Robal" Matera – guitar, vocals (1981– )
- Krzysztof Grabowski – drums (1981– )
- Jacek Chrzanowski – bass (2000– )

=== Previous members ===
- Dariusz "Stepa" Stepnowski – bass, vocals (1981–1985)
- Dariusz "Skandal" Hajn – vocals (1981–1986, died of drug overdose in 1995)
- Paweł Piotrowski – bass, vocals (1985–1993)
- Tomasz "Tony von Kinsky" Lewandowski – bass, vocals (1994–1999)

== Discography ==
=== Studio albums ===
Title	Album details	Peak chart positions
Title	Album details	POL
Kolaboracja	Released: June 10, 1987; Label: Klub Płytowy Razem; Formats: CD, LP, CS, digital download	—
Kolaboracja II	Released: February 20, 1989; Label: Poljazz; Formats: CD, LP, CS	—
Wszyscy przeciwko wszystkim	Released: August 13, 1990; Label: Arston; Formats: CD, LP, CS, digital download	—
Blasfemia	Released: September 14, 1992; Label: Izabelin Studio; Formats: CD, LP, CS, digital download	—
Ile procent duszy?	Released: September 19, 1994; Label: Polton; Formats: CD, LP, CS, digital download	—
Deuter	Released: May 1, 1995; Label: Polton; Formats: CD, CS	31
Mam kły mam pazury	Released: October 14, 1996; Label: Polton; Formats: CD, LP, CS, digital download	—
Ziemia jest płaska	Released: October 6, 1998; Label: Warner Music Poland; Formats: CD, LP, CS	—
Decydujące starcie	Released: June 4, 2001; Label: Metal Mind Productions; Formats: CD, LP	20
Nielegalny zabójca czasu	Released: June 28, 2004; Label: Metal Mind Productions; Formats: CD, LP	33
Prawo do bycia idiotą	Released: October 11, 2010; Label: Mystic Production; Formats: CD, CD+DVD, LP, digital download	19
Większy zjada mniejszego	Released: October 6, 2014; Label: Mystic Production; Formats: CD, digital download	16
Kłamstwo to nowa prawda	Released: January 29, 2021; Label: Mystic Production; Formats: CD, digital download	4
1986, co będzie jutro?	Released: September 9, 2022; Label: Mystic Production; Formats: CD, digital download; Note: Archive album	6
Wolny wybieg	Released: February 13, 2026; Label: Mystic Production; Formats: CD, LP, digital download	1
"—" denotes a recording that did not chart or was not released in that territory.

=== Live albums ===
Title	Album details
Jeszcze żywy człowiek	Release: 1984; Label: Tank Records; Formats: CS, CD
Izolacja	Release: 1986; Label: Tank Records; Formats: CS
Rock Galicja '82	Release: 9 grudnia 2021; Label: Pasażer; Formats: LP

=== Compilations ===
Title	Album details	Peak chart positions
Title	Album details	POL
Underground Out of Poland	Released: June 15, 1987; Label: Maximum Rock'n'Roll; Formats: CD, LP, CS	—
Jak powstrzymałem III wojnę światową, czyli nieznana historia Dezertera	Released: 1993; Label: Silverton; Formats: CD, LP, CS	—
Punk’s Not Jazz	Released: 24 April 2006; Label: Metal Mind Productions; Formats: CD	—

=== Video albums ===
Title	Video details
Przystanek Woodstock 2004	Released: 2005; Label: Złoty Melon; Formats: DVD

=== EP ===
Title	Video details
Nienawiść 100%	Released: February 22, 2019; Label: Mystic Production; Formats: CD, LP
Żółć/Pomocne Dłonie	Released: December 8, 2023; Label: Mystic Production; Formats: LP
