= Vikentiy Khmelevskiy =

Vikentiy Ferdinandovich Khmelevskiy
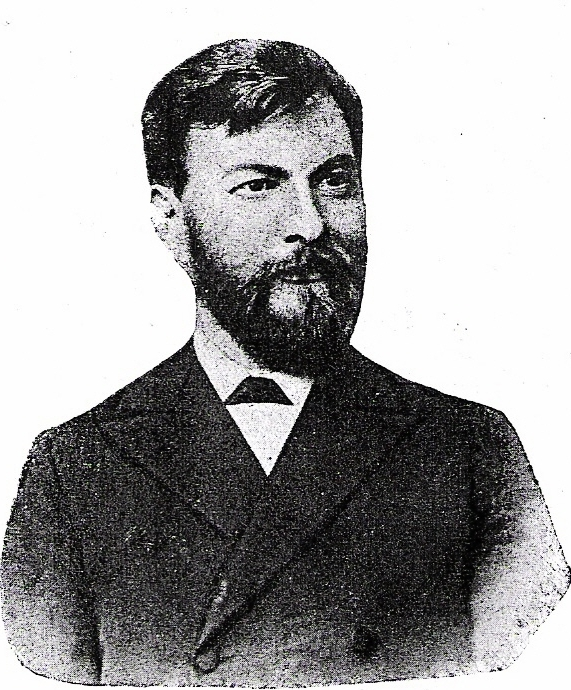
- Born: Vikentiy Ferdinandovich Khmelevskiy; Викентий Фердинандович Хмелевский; 1860
- Died: 1933 (aged 72–73); Leningrad
- Occupation: botanist

Vikentiy Ferdinandovich Khmelevskiy (Russian: Викентий Фердинандович Хмелевский; 1860 — 1933, Leningrad) was a Russian botanist and extraordinary professor of the University of Warsaw and Rostov University.

== Biography ==
Vikentiy Khmelevskiy was born in 1860 in Siberia. He graduated from the Natural Department of the Physics and Mathematics Faculty of the Imperial Novorossiya University. In 1888 he was appointed privat-docent of Kharkov University. In 1889 he was appointed assistant professor at the Institute of Agriculture and Forestry in Nowa Aleksandria.

In 1890 he defended his thesis for master's degree in botanics at Kharkov University on the topic "Materials for the morphology and physiology of the sexual process in lower plants". In 1901 he was appointed an extraordinary professor at the University of Warsaw.

In 1915 together with the staff of the University of Warsaw, he was evacuated to Rostov-on-Don, where he took an active part in the organization of the Natural Department of the Physics and Mathematics Faculty of the Don University and later also the Biological Faculty.

Khmelevskiy had a dacha in the village of Krasnaya Polyana, where he conducted research and gave lectures to local residents. In particular, he carried out research and compiled descriptions of lakes in the eastern part of Achishkho Range, which is situated in the vicinity of Krasnaya Polyana. These lakes there are now called Khmelevskiy lakes in his honour.

After the Russian Revolution of 1917, he settled in Sochi. In 1921 he was appointed an instructor on out-of-school education of Sochi Department of Public Education. He continued to give lectures, conducted meteorological observations and took part in the compilation of collections and herbariums in Sochi museum of local lore.
