= Włodzimierz Kiniorski =

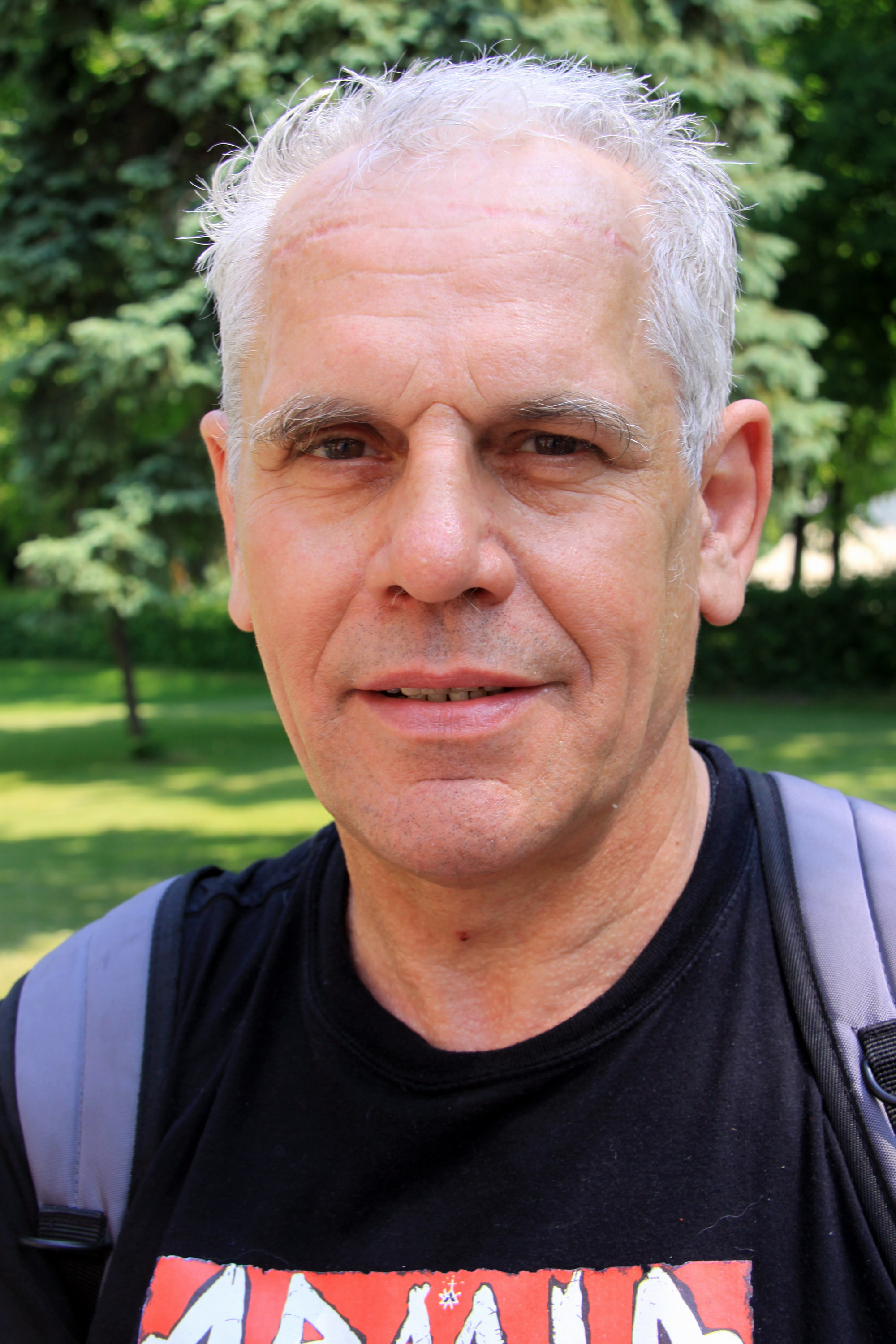
- Born: Włodzimierz Kiniorski; 15 July 1952 (age 73); Zagnańsk, Poland
- Occupation: Musician
- Musical career
- Also known as: Kinior
- Genres: Punk, rock, reggae, new wave, Flap, jazz
- Instrument: saxophone

Włodzimierz Kiniorski, also known as Kinior, (born 15 July 1952) is a Polish musician. He was a member of Brygada Kryzys.

== Discography ==
- Undergrajdoł (1987)
- Cosmopolis (1992)
- Darmozjad (1997)
- Goral-Ska Apo-Calypso (2000)
- Ethno Techno (2004)
- Odmieniec (2006)
- Live in Bohema Jazz Club (2007)
- Juhaskie Bazynio (2007)
- Ludovizja (2008)
- Myriam (2009)
- Bee (2010)
- Intarsja (2010)
- Dwugłowy smok. Festiwal Wolność i Pokój (2014)
