= Post Regiment (album) =

Studio album by Post Regiment
- Released: 1992
- Recorded: 1991
- Genre: Punk rock
- Label: QQRYQ
- Producer: Robert Brylewski

Post Regiment chronology
Post Regiment (1992)	Czarzły (1996)

Post Regiment is the debut album of Polish punk rock band Post Regiment. The album was recorded in Złota Skała studio in Warsaw, between December 1991 and August 1992.

== Track listing ==
1. "Hałas" (en.: The noise)
2. "Czarzły" (en.: Evil spell)
3. "Znaczy wiesz" (en.: It means you know)
4. "Religia" (en.: Religion)
5. "Wycieczka na pustynię" (en.: A trip to the desert)
6. "Numer" (en.: The number)
7. "Nowy dzień" (en.: A new day)
8. "Mrok" (en.: Darkness)
9. "Post" (en.: Lent)
10. "Jak dobrze" (en.: So good)
11. "Kolory" (en.: Colours)
12. "Skóra" (en.: Skin)
13. "Wstyd" (en.: Shame)
14. "Słowa o..." (en.: Words about...)
15. "Anioł" (en.: The angel)
16. "Ostatni raz" (en.: Last time)
17. "Farrus (to dla Ciebie ...)" (en.: Farrus (it's for you))
18. "Chory" (en.: The sick one)
19. "Catch another train"
20. "Konie" (en.: Horses)
21. "Kurwy" (en.: Whores)
22. "Awareness"
23. "Now I know"

== Personnel ==
- Max (drums)
- Rolf (bass guitar)
- Nika (vocals)
- Janek (guitar)
- Smok (guitar)

== Resource ==
- http://homepages.nyu.edu/~cch223/poland/albums/postregiment_postregiment.html URL accessed at 30 August 2006
