= Wet Za Wet =

Studio album by Abaddon
- Released: 1986 re-released in 2001
- Recorded: 1985
- Genre: Punk rock
- Label: New Wave Records (1986); Pop Noise (2001)
- Producer: W. Zawistowski

Abaddon chronology
Wet Za Wet (1986)	Walcz o Swoją Wolność (1996)

Wet Za Wet is an album from Polish punk rock band Abaddon. The album has been re-released in 2001 on CD.

== Track listing ==
1. Wet za wet
2. Boimy sie siebie
3. Apartheid
4. Ljubljana Night
5. Kto?
6. Koniec swiata
7. System
8. III wojna
9. Rewolucja

=== CD bonus tracks ===
1. Kukly
2. Walcz o siebie
3. Abaddon
4. Zolnierz tego swiata

== Personnel ==
- Tomasz Lutek Frost - bass guitar
- Bernard Beniu Szarafinski- guitar
- Tomasz Perełka Dorn - drums
- Waldemar Kiki Jedyczkowski - vocals

== Resources ==
http://homepages.nyu.edu/~cch223/poland/albums/abaddon_walczoswojawolnosc.html, URL accessed at 31 August 2006
