= Underground Out of Poland =

Compilation album by Dezerter
- Released: 1987
- Recorded: 1983–1985 (Poland)
- Genre: Hardcore punk Anarcho punk
- Length: 46:04
- Label: Maximumrocknroll; QQRYQ Productions; Pop Noise
- Producer: Robert Matera

Dezerter chronology
Ku przyszłości (1983)	Underground Out of Poland (1987)	Kolaboracja (1988)

Underground Out of Poland is the compilation album by Polish punk rock band Dezerter. It was released in US during 1987 through Maximumrocknroll Records (Joey Shithead from D.O.A. helped in the release), and was re-released in 1996 by QQRYQ Productions and 2002 by Pop Noise Records. Track 1-4 was recorded in 1983, in Studio Wawrzyszew, 5-8 and 15-17 in 1984 at Jarocin Festival, 10-15 and 18 on illegal session on Program 1 Polskiego Radia studio.

The cover art was created by David Lester and Martin Sprouse.

Underground Out of Poland is considered to be one of the most important albums in the history of Polish rock.

== Track listing ==
No.	Title	Length
1.	"Ku przyszłości" (eng. To the Future)	2:53
2.	"Spytaj milicjanta" (eng. Ask the Militiaman)	1:37
3.	"Szara rzeczywistość" (eng. Drab Reality)	1:58
4.	"Wojna głupców" (eng. War of Fools)	2:09
5.	"Plakat" (eng. Poster)	3:06
6.	"Nie ma zagrożenia/T. (Note: Since the 2019 reissue, "Nie ma zagrożenia" and "T." are split as separate tracks.)" (eng. There Is No Threat/T.)	2:28
7.	"Niewolnik" (eng. Slave)	1:52
8.	"Rebeliant" (eng. A Rebel)	3:27
9.	"Postęp" (eng. Progress)	3:45
10.	"Zatrute powietrze" (eng. Poisoned Air)	2:56
11.	"Uległość" (eng. Submission)	3:01
12.	"Zmiany" (eng. Changes)	3:13
13.	"Polska złota młodzież" (eng. Polish Golden Youth)	3:32
14.	"Urodziłem się 20 lat po wojnie" (eng. I Was Born 20 Years After the War)	3:06
15.	"Kto?" (eng. Who?)	3:11
16.	"XXI wiek" (eng. 21st Century)	1:08
17.	"Szwindel" (eng. Swindle)	2:29
18.	"Dla zysku" (eng. For Profit)	1:44

== Personnel ==
- Dariusz "Skandal" Hajn - vocal
- Robert "Robal" Matera - vocal, guitar
- Krzysztof Grabowski - percussion, lyrics
- Dariusz "Stepa" Stepnowski - vocal, bass

== Release history ==
Region	Date
United States	1987
Poland	1996
