= Czarzły =

Studio album by Post Regiment
- Released: 1996
- Recorded: 1996
- Genre: Punk rock
- Label: QQRYQ

Post Regiment chronology
Post Regiment (1992)	Czarzły (1996)	Tragedia wg. Post Regiment (1999)

Czarzły is the second album of Polish punk rock band Post Regiment.

== Track listing ==
1. Korzeń (en.: The root)
2. Znów (en.: Again)
3. Wielki las (en.: A great forest)
4. Getto (en.: Ghetto)
5. Dość (en.: Enough)
6. Szyby (en.: Windows)
7. Shit and show
8. Brumby
9. Stado (en.: The herd)
10. After
11. Skąd ty mieszkasz (en.: Where from do you live)
12. Kurewska (en.: Fucked up)
13. Norma (en.: The norm)
14. Rodzina (en.: Family)
15. Kiedy krzyczę (en.: When I shout)
16. Krowy (en.: Cows)
17. Kolory (en.: Colours)

== Personnel ==
- Max (drums)
- Rolf (bass guitar)
- Nika (vocals)
- Smok (guitar)

== Resource ==
- http://homepages.nyu.edu/~cch223/poland/albums/postregiment_postregiment.html URL accessed at 30 August 2006
