= Nie do Poznania =

Studio album by Abaddon
- Released: 1999
- Recorded: 1985
- Genre: Punk rock

Abaddon chronology
Walcz o Swoją Wolność (1996)	Nie do Poznania (1999)

Nie do Poznania is the third album of Polish punk rock band Abaddon.

== Track listing ==
1. "Intro/Przemoc i sila"
2. "Zostan bohaterem"
3. "Abaddon"
4. "Apartheid"
5. "System"
6. "Zolnierz"

== Personnel ==
- Tomasz Lutek Frost - bass guitar
- Bernard Beniu Szafrański - guitar
- Tomasz Perełka Dorn - drums
- Waldemar Kiki Jedyczkowski - vocals

== Resources ==
http://homepages.nyu.edu/~cch223/poland/albums/abaddon_walczoswojawolnosc.html, URL accessed at 31 August 2006
