= Tragiedia wg Post Regiment =

Studio album by Post Regiment
- Released: 1999
- Recorded: 1999
- Genre: Hardcore punk
- Label: QQRYQ

Post Regiment chronology
Czarzły (1996)	Tragiedia wg Post Regiment (1999)

Tragiedia wg Post Regiment is the third album of Polish punk rock band Post Regiment. The album includes songs written by Post Regiment's friend band, Tragedia. Tragedia ceased to exist without releasing any albums. Two of the band's members supported Post Regiment during recording.

== Track listing ==
1. "Ostatni dzień" (en.: The last day)
2. "Nie mam nic" (en.: I have nothing)
3. "Jutro" (en.: Tomorrow)
4. "Co się ze mną dzieje" (en.: What's happening to me?)
5. "Zimno" (en.: Cold)
6. "Ktoś" (en.: Someone)
7. "Brak słów" (en.: Not enough words)
8. "Kanały" (en.: The canals)
9. "Burdel" (en.: The brothel)
10. "Nie ma odpowiedzi" (en.: No answers)
11. "Ty tańczysz" (en.: You're dancing)
12. "Krowy" (en.: Cows)
13. "Znowu raj" (en.: Paradise again)
14. "P.S."
15. "Uciekaj" (en.: Run away)
16. "Szczury" (en.: Rats)
17. "Nie znoszę was" (en.: I can't stand you)
18. "Aaa!!!"
19. "Gliniarze" (en.: Cops)
20. "Świnia" (en.: Pig)
21. "Nic po nas" (en.: No use for us)
22. "Nic po was" (en.: No use for you)
23. "Wychowanie" (en.: Education)
24. "Nażarty" (en.: Full)
25. "Ludzkie mięso" (en.: Human flesh)
26. "0"
27. "Jodły" (en.: Pines)
28. "Cisza" (en.: Silence)
29. "Jak pies" (en.: Like a dog)
30. "Jestem z tobą" (en.: I'm with you)
31. "Kurewska" (en.: Fucked up)
32. "Wybór" (en.: Choice)

== Personnel ==
- Max (drums)
- Rolf (bass guitar)
- Nika (vocals)
- Smok (guitar)
- Amoniak (vocals) - Tragedia member
- Tom Goryl (bass guitar) - Tragedia member

== Resource ==
- http://homepages.nyu.edu/~cch223/poland/albums/postregiment_postregiment.html URL accessed at 30 August 2006
