= Walcz o Swoją Wolność =

Studio album by Abaddon
- Released: 1996
- Recorded: 1984/1985
- Genre: Punk rock

Abaddon chronology
Wet Za Wet (1986)	Walcz o Swoją Wolność (1996)	Nie do Poznania (1999)

Walcz o Swoją Wolność is an album put out by the Polish punk rock band Abaddon.

== Track listing ==
1. "Koniec swiata"
2. "Zamknij sie w sobie"
3. "Walcz o swoja wolnosc"
4. "Boimy sie siebie"
5. "Kto"
6. "Kukly"

== Personnel ==
- Tomasz Lutek Frost - bass guitar
- Bernard Beniu Szafrański - guitar
- Tomasz Perełka Dorn - drums
- Waldemar Kiki Jedyczkowski - vocals

== Resources ==
http://homepages.nyu.edu/~cch223/poland/albums/abaddon_walczoswojawolnosc.html, URL accessed at 31 August 2006
