= Nowa Aleksandria =

Studio album by Siekiera
- Released: 1986
- Recorded: December 1985 at Tonpress KAW Studio, Warsaw, Poland
- Genres: Post-punk, cold wave
- Length: 53:18 (CD)
- Label: Tonpress

Siekiera chronology
Fala (1985)	Nowa Aleksandria (1986)

Nowa Aleksandria (English: New Alexandria) is the only studio album by Polish band Siekiera. It was released in 1986, through the record label Tonpress. The album marks a departure from the band's punk rock sound in favour of the coldwave and darkwave genres. Although formerly unpopular within the Polish punk rock music scene, the album has later established a cult following within the Polish new wave scene and is now considered a household name within the cold wave genre in Poland.

== Track listing ==
All songs written and composed by Tomasz Adamski.

Side A
No.	Title	Length
1.	"Idziemy przez las (Marching through the Forest)"	3:45
2.	"Ludzie wschodu (People of the East)"	4:17
3.	"Bez końca (Without End)"	3:21
4.	"Idziemy na skraj (Marching to the Edge)"	3:25
5.	"Na zewnątrz (Outside)"	6:00

Side B
No.	Title	Length
1.	"Nowa Aleksandria (The New Alexandria)"	3:11
2.	"To słowa (It's Words)"	3:11
3.	"Już blisko (So Close)"	2:42
4.	"Tak dużo, tak mocno (So Much, So Hard)"	4:00
5.	"Czerwony pejzaż (The Red Landscape)"	4:44

CD bonus tracks
No.	Title	Length
1.	"Misiowie puszyści (Puffy Bear Teddies)"	2:41
2.	"Jest bezpiecznie (It's safe)"	5:29
3.	"Ja stoję, ja tańczę, ja walczę (I'm standing, I'm dancing, I'm fighting)"	5:11

== Personnel ==
Siekiera

- Tomasz Adamski – vocal, guitar
- Dariusz Malinowski – vocals, bass guitar
- Paweł Młynarczyk – keyboards
- Zbigniew Musiński – drums

Production

- Alek Januszewski – sleeve artwork (graphics)
- Włodzimierz Kowalczyk – engineering
- Tadeusz Czechak – engineering assistance
