= Izrael (band) =

Polish reggae band

- Origin: Warsaw, Poland
- Genre: Reggae
- Years active: 1983–1995, 2006–2018
- Labels: Polton, Pronit, Arston, Phonex, Gold Rock, W Moich Oczach, Lemon Records
- Members: Robert "Afa" Brylewski; Paweł "Kelner" Rozwadowski; Dariusz "Maleo" Malejonek; Włodzimierz "Kinior" Kiniorski; Piotr "Samohut" Subotkiewicz; Sławomir "Dżu Dżu" Wróblewski
- Past members: Vivian Quarcoo; Milo Kurtis; Tomasz "Żwirek" Żmijewski; Jarosław "Gruszka" Ptasiński; Wojciech Konikiewicz; Tadeusz Kuczyński; Katarzyna Grzechnik; Tomasz Lipiński; Sławomir "Dr Avane" Gołaszewski; Tomasz "Lego" Ber; Piotr Malak; Sławomir "Rudi" Lewandowski; Błażej "Krzaczasty" Pajda; Aleksander ”Alik” Dziki; Tomasz "Bombadil" Budzyński; Krzysztof "Banan" Banasik; Paweł Szanajca; Piotr "Stopa" Żyżelewicz

Izrael was one of the most popular and influential Polish reggae bands. It was formed in March 1983 in Warsaw by two well-known Polish underground musicians: Robert Brylewski (formerly of Brygada Kryzys) and Paweł Kelner (formerly of Deuter).

== Information ==
According to Brylewski, "Izrael's creation was a consequence of the death of Brygada Kryzys. During last rehearsals of Brygada Kryzys only three musicians were present: Kelner, me and Tomasz Lipinski. There was nobody else. It was the end of 1982, hard times for Polish independent rockers. At some point Tomasz put his guitar on the side and said "I quit."

Izrael's debut took place on April 25, 1983, in the Hybrydy student club in Warsaw, where the band rehearsed. The first recording, "Idą ludzie Babilonu," was made later that year and quickly gained popularity. The band started to play in numerous concerts (such as at the Festival in Jarocin, and a series of concerts called God's Music in Babylon). It also supported the group Misty in Roots when they came to Poland.

In May 1983, the first LP, Biada, biada biada, was recorded, but it was not delivered to stores until many months later.

In 1986, Kelner decided to quit and was replaced by Darek "Maleo" Malejonek (formerly of Kultura), with whom the second album, Nabij faję, was recorded. At that time, Izrael's musicians decided to accept any person who would like to play with them and who would bring something creative. Several musicians therefore became members of Izrael, including jazzmen, which was unusual for a reggae band. Altogether, approximately 100 musicians have been members of Izrael at one time or another. In 1987, the third album, Duchowa Rewolucja, was recorded.

Around the year 1989, Izrael became an established band with Brylewski, Vivian Brylewska (Robert's wife), Maleo, Piotr "Stopa" Żyżelewicz and Alik Dziki. In the same year, the band went on a tour to then-Communist Czechoslovakia. Shortly afterwards, Wlodzimierz Kiniorski joined as a new member. He played several instruments, including the saxophone and the flute.

In 1990, the band went to Great Britain on an invitation from Marcin Miller. There they played several concerts and, more importantly, recorded an LP, 1991, which is regarded as one of the best albums in the history of Polish music. 1991 was recorded at a "Ariwa Sounds," a studio owned by Mad Professor.

After their return to Poland, Izrael played numerous concerts and the band was enthusiastically embraced by fans. In 1994, the concert album Live 93 was issued, which included songs recorded live in Kraków and Białystok. The band was at the height of its popularity, thinking about a new LP. In 1995, the band was suddenly disbanded. According to Brylewski, "[the band's] history was fulfilled", since it was not created to sell records and make money.

In 1997, Brylewski released the album In Dub—a dubbed mix of the band's best songs. In 2006, the band, temporarily known as Magnetosfera, played a few concerts. Izrael returned in 2007 and reportedly is preparing a new album.

== Discography ==
| Title | Album details | Peak chart positions |
| Title | Album details | POL |
|---|---|---|
| Biada, biada biada | Released: 1985; Label: Pronit; Formats: LP, CD, CS | — |
| Nabij Faje | Released: 1986; Label: Pronit; Formats: LP, CD, CS | — |
| Duchowa rewolucja vol. 1 | Released: 1987; Label: Arston; Formats: LP, CD, CS | — |
| Duchowa rewolucja vol. 2 | Released: 1991; Label: Arston; Formats: LP, CD, CS | — |
| 1991 | Released: 1991; Label: D.N.A.; Formats: LP, CD, CS | — |
| Live 93 | Released: 1994; Label: Phonex; Formats: CD, CS | — |
| In dub | Released: 1997; Label: Złota Skała; Formats: CD, CS | — |
| Dża Ludzie | Released: November 10, 2008; Label: Lemon Records; Formats: CD | 22 |
| Izrael Meets Mad Professor And Joe Ariwa | Released: December 6, 2010; Label: W Moich Oczach; Formats: LP, CD | — |
"—" denotes a recording that did not chart or was not released in that territory.
