= Post Regiment =

Polish punk band

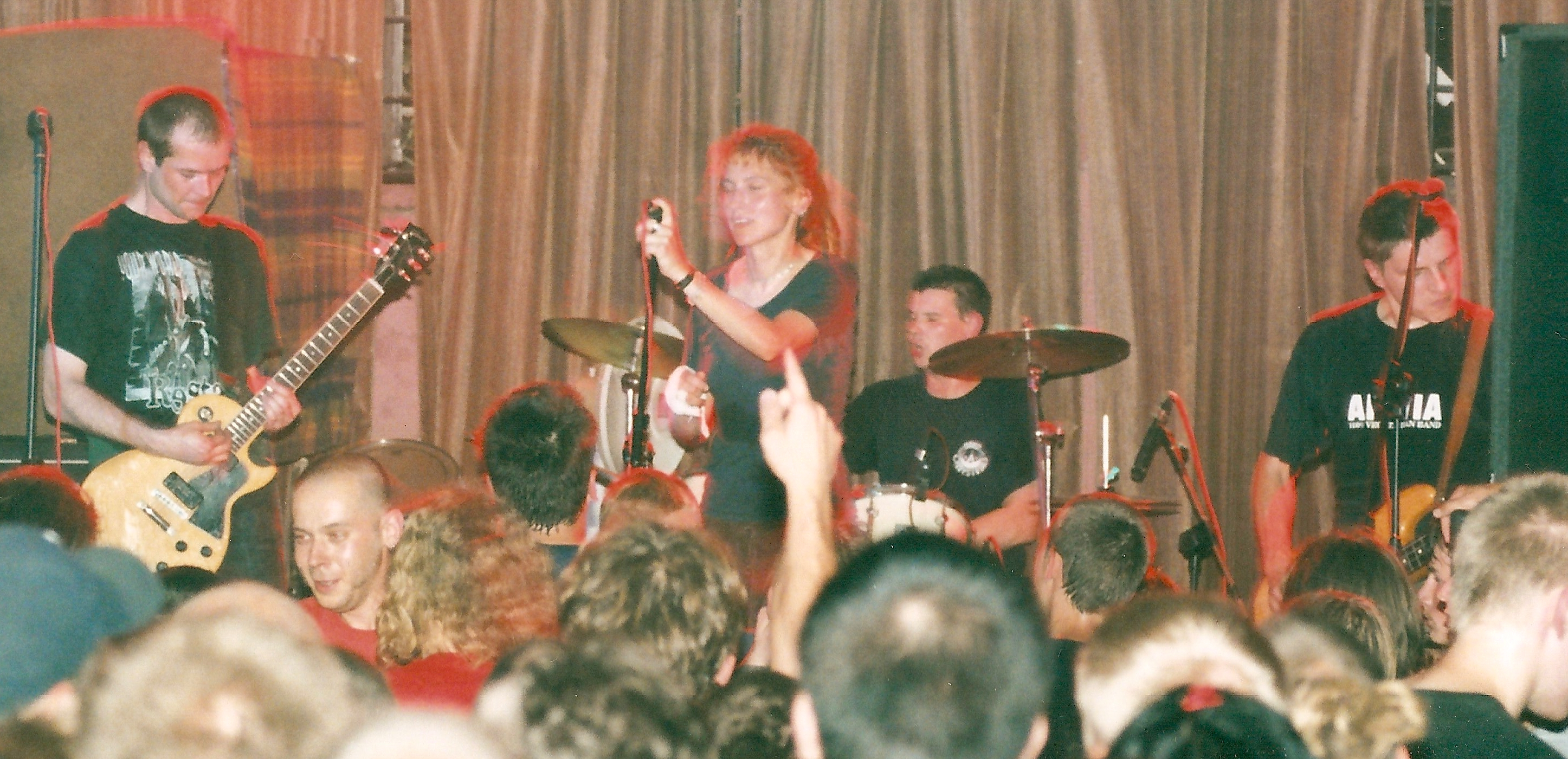
- Post Regiment in concert

Background information
- Origin: Warsaw, Poland
- Genres: Hardcore punk
- Years active: 1986–2000
- Labels: Pop Noise, Profane Existence

Post Regiment were a Polish punk rock or hardcore punk band. They formed in Warsaw in 1986.

In the early days, Post Regiment had a much slower pace and more conventional singing style with vocalist Darek "Tolek" Gracki. By 1987, he left and Dominika "Nika" Domczyk took over on vocals. The band developed a faster, melodic punk sound by their 1992 self-titled first album.

Their second album, Czarzly, was released in 1995 and adopted a faster crust punk sound with rawer vocals and d-beat-style drumming.

Their final album, Tragiedia wg Post Regiment ("Tragedy According To Post Regiment") was released in 1998 on Profane Existence records in the USA and Skuld releases in Europe. It was an album of hardcore punk songs by the Polish band Tragiedia, longtime friends of Post Regiment who broke up without ever putting out a record.

Post Regiment had a fairly unusual sound in hardcore punk, with some unusual elements like melodic singing, Eastern European modes, instrumentals and the occasional synthesizer. The band broke up in 2001, although they still practice from time to time.

Album Death Before The Metal, released in 2007, contains songs recorded between 1988 and 1990.

== Members ==
- Jarek Smok Smak - guitar (1986–2000)
- Rafał Rolf Biskup - bass guitar (1986–2000)
- Darek Tolek Gracki - vocals (1986–1989)
- Maksymilian Max Gralewicz - drums (1986–2000)
- Dominika Nika Domczyk - vocals (1989–2000)
- Janek Cybulski - guitar (1989–2000)

== Discography ==
- Słodka 16-tka, 1988 Demo tape
- Post Regiment, 1992
- Czarzły, 1996
- Tragiedia wg Post Regiment, 1999
- Death Before The Metal, 2007
