= Eryk Lipiński =

Polish artist (1908–1991)

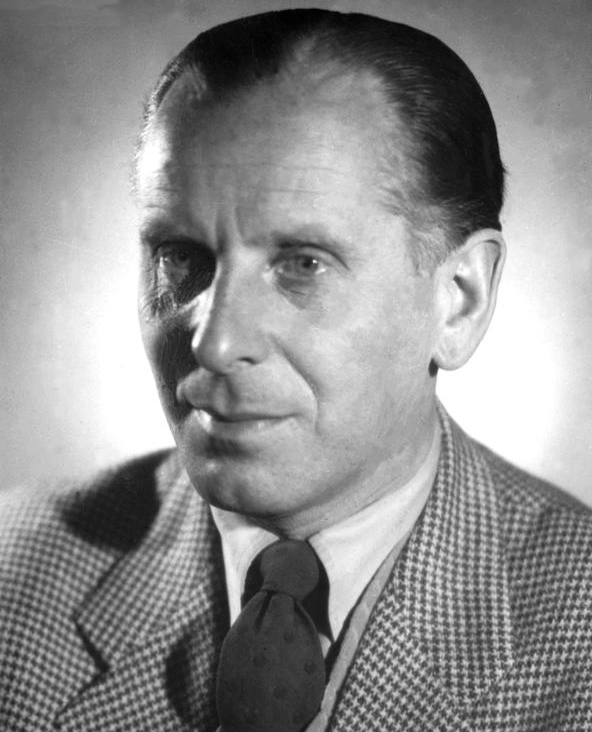
- Pronunciation: ˈɛrɨk liˈpiɲskʲi
- Born: July 12, 1908; Kraków
- Died: September 27, 1991 (aged 83)
- Education: Warsaw Academy of Fine Arts
- Occupations: Satirist, caricaturist, essayist
- Spouse: Anna Gosławska-Lipińska
- Children: Tomasz Lipiński, Zuzanna Lipińska
- Honours: Righteous Among the Nations Commander's Cross of the Order of Polonia Restituta Officer's Cross of the Order of Polonia Restituta Gold Cross of Merit Medal of Victory and Freedom 1945 Order of the Banner of Labour Medal of the 10th Anniversary of People's Poland

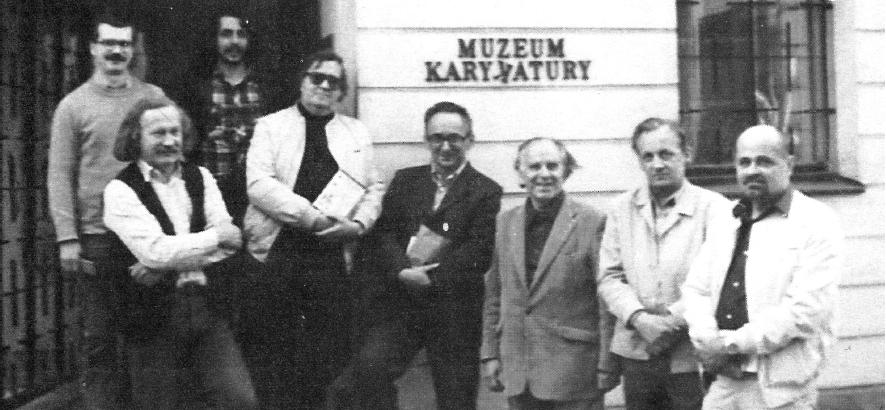
Polish caricaturists. From the left: Zygmunt Januszewski, Robert Szecówka, Andrzej Podulka, Juliusz Puchalski, Zbigniew Jujka, Eryk Lipiński, Zbigniew Ziomecki, Julian Bohdanowicz.

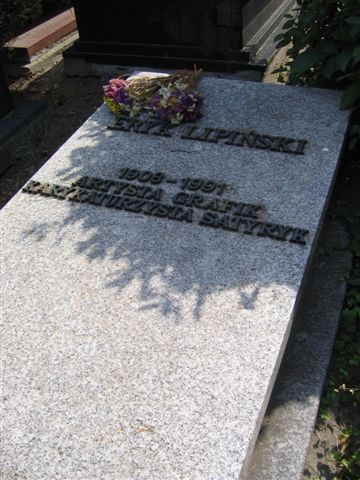
Eryk Lipiński's grave at the Powązki Cemetery

Eryk Lipiński (Polish pronunciation: [ˈɛrɨk liˈpiɲskʲi]; 12 July 1908 – 27 September 1991) was a Polish artist, satirist, caricaturist, essayist, poster designer, playwright and writer.

== Biography ==
Eryk Lipiński studied at the Warsaw Academy of Fine Arts from 1933 to 1939. His debut as a caricaturist was made few years earlier, in 1928, in magazine Pobudka. In 1935 he cofounded with Zbigniew Mitzner a satirical magazine Szpilki; he was its chief editor for several years (1935–1937 and 1946–1953). During World War II he was one of the artists working with the Polish resistance, involved in production of false documents. He was arrested by the Nazis and imprisoned in the infamous Pawiak prison, in Mokotów prison and in the Auschwitz concentration camp.

After the war he joined the Polish United Workers' Party. He contributed to many newspapers and magazines, such as Przekrój, Przegląd Kulturalny, Trybuna Ludu, Panorama, Zwierciadło and Express Wieczorny. In 1966 he organized the First International Poster Biennale. In 1978 he founded the Museum of Caricature in Warsaw and was its first director (it would be named after him in 2002). In 1980 he formed the Committee for the Preservation of Jewish Monuments in Poland. Active in preserving Polish Jewish culture; in 1987 he founded the Association of Polish Cartoonists (Stowarzyszenie Polskich Artystów Karykatury, SPAK).

One of the Polish Righteous Among the Nations (he received this title in 1991).

== Honours ==
- Commander's Cross of the Order of Polonia Restituta
- Officer's Cross of the Order of Polonia Restituta
- Gold Cross of Merit
- Medal of Victory and Freedom 1945
- Order of the Banner of Work
- Medal of the 10th Anniversary of People's Poland

== Awards ==
- 1948 - seven 1st prizes at the International Poster Exhibition in Vienna
- 1964 - 1st prize for the best political poster of 1963
- 1966 - Gold Pin (Złota Szpilka)
- 1972 - Gold Pin with Laurel (Złota Szpilka z Wawrzynem)
- 1981 - "Distinguished Artist of the Year 1980" of The Association of American Editorial Cartoonists
