= Apatia =

Polish punk rock and hardcore band

Apatia is a popular Polish punk rock and hardcore band. They were founded in 1989 in Poznań, where they played a farewell concert in May 2011. Its members actively support vegetarianism and straight edge ideology.

== History ==
Apatia was formed in 1989 from another group called HCP. The band’s first gig was in 1990 at the independent Roberge Festival in Warsaw. Since then, Apatia has played frequent concerts in Poland and other European countries, such as Germany and France. In 1993, Apatia was mentioned in the article about straight edge movement in the Polish Encyclopedia PWN.

== Current lineup ==
- Matol - vocal
- Krzychu - drums
- Jędrek - guitar
- Stiepan - bass guitar

== Former members ==
- Bulwa - guitar,
- Arek - guitar,
- Szymon - bass guitar.

== Discography ==
- 1993 Walka Czy Apatia (Struggle or apathy)
- 1993 Punk Floyd
- 1994 Odejdz Lub Zostan (Leave or stay)
- 1995 5 Piosenek o tym jak niszczymy system (Five songs about us destroying the system)
- 1995 Dwa w jednym (Two in one)
- 1997 Apatia
- 2000 100% Vegetarian band
- 2002 Manipulacja (Manipulation)
- 2007 Uleglosc (Submission)
