= Abaddon (Polish band) =

Polish punk rock band

- Origin: Poland
- Genre: Punk rock
- Years active: 1982–1987; 2001–present
- Labels: New Wave Records; Pop Noise
- Members: Kiki; Zwierzak; Perełka; Władysław Refling

Abaddon is a Polish punk rock band.

== History ==
=== Early history ===
The band got together in Bydgoszcz in 1982 under the name "Partyzantka Miejska" ("Urban Guerilla"), but soon decided on the name "Abaddon". Their first significant performance occurred at the Jarocin Festival in 1983. Soon after that, two days before a show in Poznań, the lead singer Wolf quit the group. Kiki (Waldek Jedyczowski) then became the lead singer.

Abaddon again performed at the Jarocin Festival in 1984 and 1985. One of their songs, (Kto), which was recorded at the 1985 Festival, was featured on the Fala compilation LP. They soon met a journalist from Yugoslavia, Peter Barbaric, who arranged a tour for them that was profitable enough to pay for a recording session at the Borutcine Studio in Ljubliana. That session, done in May 1985, produced the album Wet Za Wet.

In 1987, conflicts emerged among the band members as some of them wanted to pursue heavier hardcore while others preferred a more melodic punk. That strife eventually led to Abaddon's split. Most of the members abandoned the music scene except for Tomek Dorn (Perelka). He went on playing for a local cold wave band called Variété.

=== Reunion ===
In 2001, two of the original members, Tomek Dorn and Kiki, reformed the band with two new musicians, Wladek Refling (bass) and Zwierzak (guitar). Wet Za Wet was also re-issued on CD by Pop Noise Records in 2001 with four bonus tracks—three of them live versions.

== Members ==
=== Current ===
- Kiki - Waldemar Jedyczkowski – vocals
- Zwierzak - Robert Dembczyński - guitar
- Władysław Refling – bass guitar
- Perełka - Tomasz Dorn – drums

=== Former ===
- Wolf - Mirosław Wolf (born 1963 – died 2016) – vocals (1982)
- Lutek - Tomasz Frost – bass guitar (1982–1987)
- Beniu - Bernard Szafrański – guitar (1982–1987)

== Discography ==
- Wet Za Wet 1986
- Walcz o Swoją Wolność 1996
- Nie do Poznania 1999
