= Tomasz Lipiński =

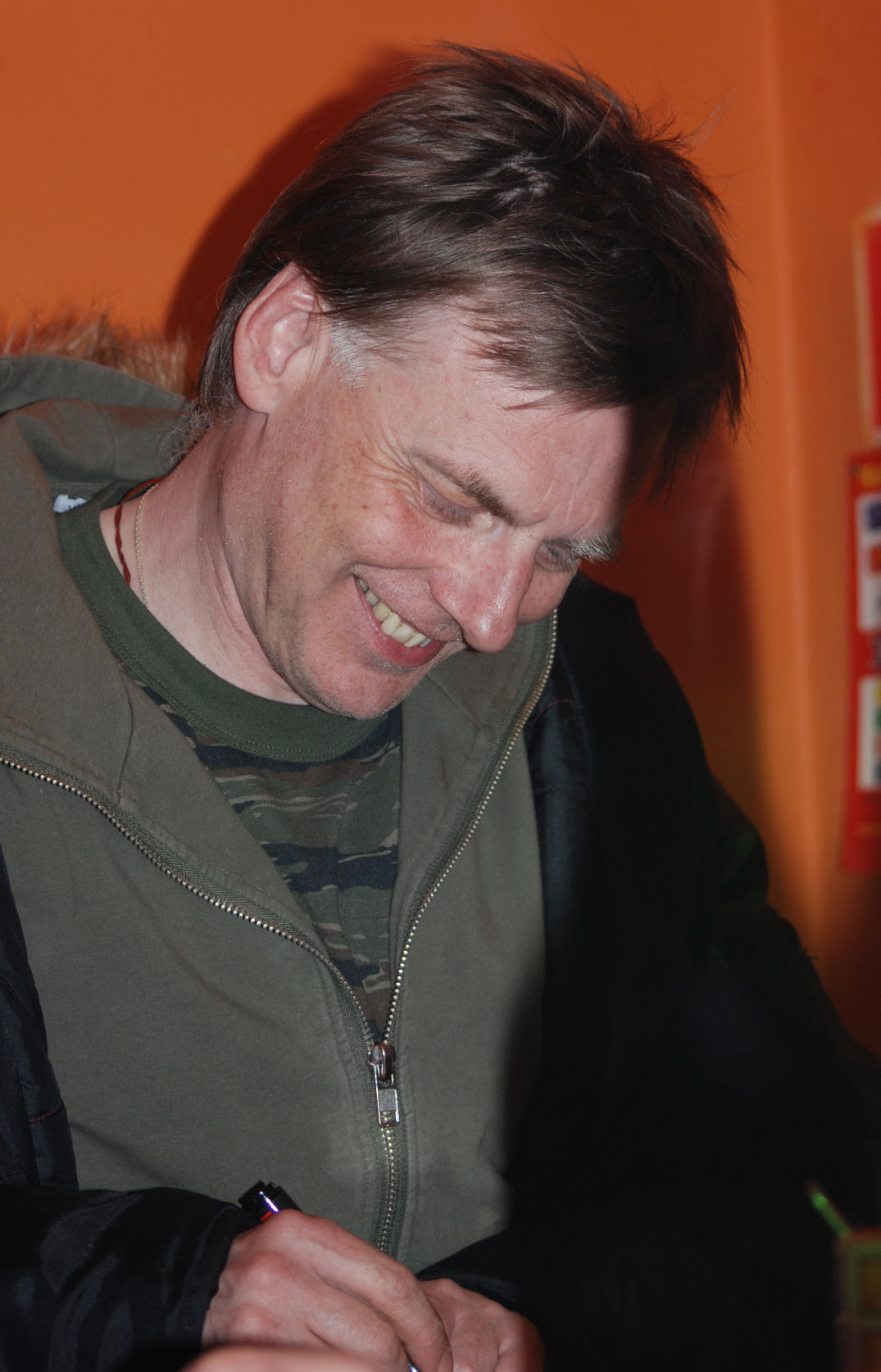
- Tomasz Lipiński in 2007
- Born: 21 August 1955 (age 70); Warsaw, Poland
- Occupations: Musician, singer
- Children: 2 (daughters)
- Parent: Eryk Lipiński
- Relatives: Zuzanna Lipińska (stepsister)
- Musical career
- Also known as: Frantz
- Genres: Rock, punk
- Instrument: Guitar
- Label: BMG Ariola Poland

Tomasz “Frantz” Lipinski is a Polish rock guitarist, lyricist, composer and singer. Born on 21 August 1955 in Warsaw, Lipinski is the founder of Tilt, one of the first punk rock bands in Poland, and co-founder of Brygada Kryzys, regarded as an influential rock band in Poland. Furthermore, he was a member of the bands Fotoness and Izrael.

He is the son of the satirist and caricaturist Eryk Lipinski, but was raised by his mother, for the first time meeting his father at the age of eight. In 1975, Lipinski graduated from high school, and continued his education at Academy of Fine Arts in Warsaw. In 1979, Lipinski founded Tilt, one of the first punk rock bands in Poland. In the summer of 1981, together with Robert Brylewski, Lipinski founded Brygada Kryzys, an influential new wave group in Poland. After the dissolution of Brygada Kryzys, Lipinski shortly joined Izrael, later re-creating Tilt. In the 1990s, he wrote a column for the “Tylko Rock” music magazine, worked for BMG Poland, was editor in chief of the “Aktivist” magazine, wrote music for several films, and acted in some movies.

Lipinski is a Buddhist, and has two daughters. In 2011, he was awarded The Order of Polonia Restituta.

== Discography ==
Solo albums

- Nie pytaj mnie (1994)
