= Tomasz Budzyński =

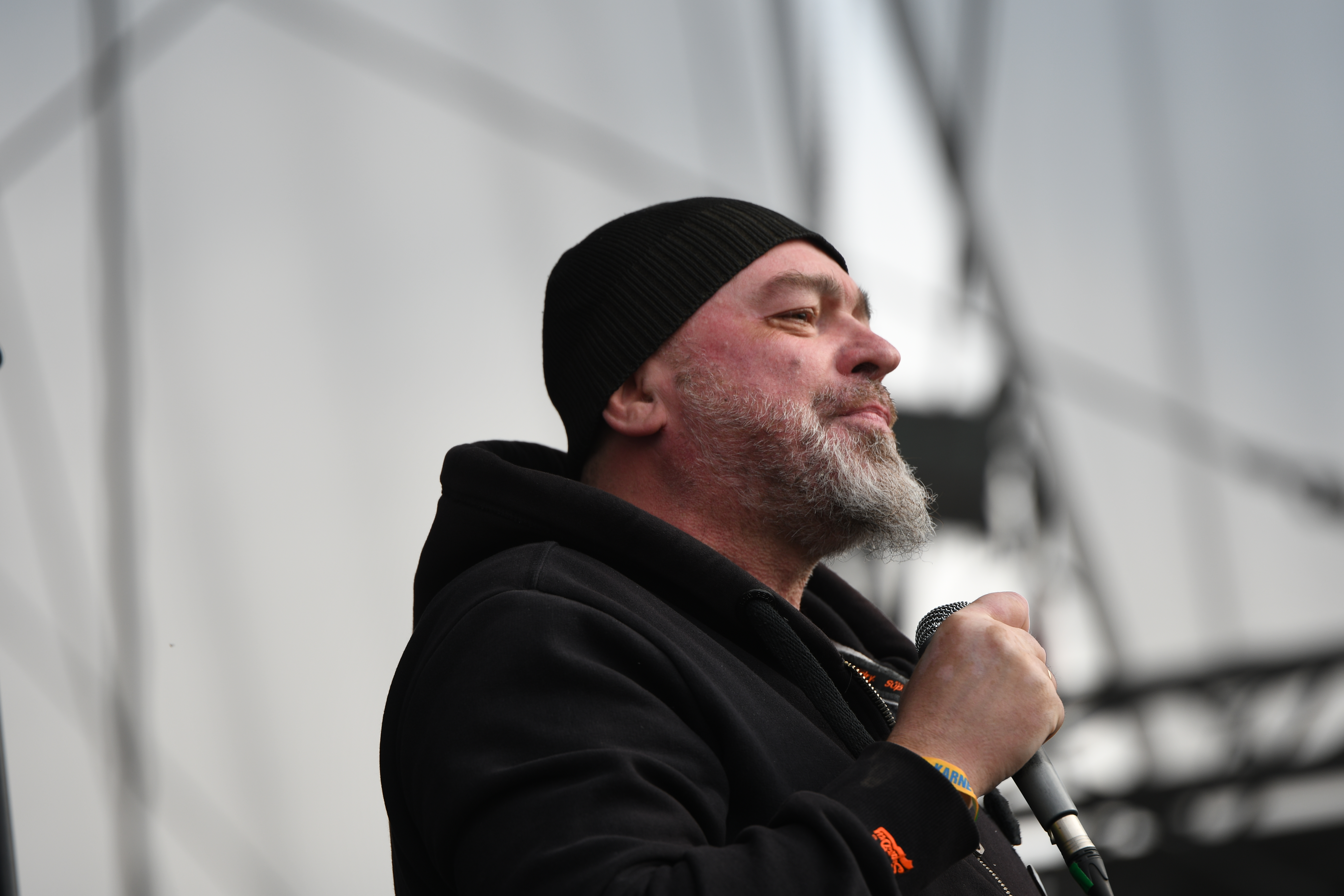
- Tomasz Budzynski in 2023
- Born: 2 October 1962 (age 63); Tarnobrzeg, Poland
- Occupations: Musician, songwriter, painter
- Spouse: Natalia Budzyńska
- Children: 2 (1 daughter, 1 son)
- Musical career
- Also known as: Budzy, Tom Bombadil
- Genres: Rock, punk rock, new wave
- Instruments: Guitar, bass guitar
- Years active: 1983-present
- Labels: Isound Labels

Tomasz Maciej Budzyński (born 2 October 1962) is a Polish musician, painter and poet, the lead vocalist of the band Armia.

He has worked with bands 2Tm2,3, Budzy i Trupia Czaszka, he was also first vocalist of punk rock band Siekiera.

== Discography ==
=== With Budzy i Trupia Czaszka ===
- 2004 - Uwagi Józefa Baki

=== As Tomasz Budzyński ===
- 2002 - Taniec Szkieletów
- 2008 - Luna
- 2011 - Osobliwości

=== Guest appearance ===
- Izrael Duchowa Rewolucja
- Acid Drinkers The State of Mind Report
