= Exodus (Polish band) =

Polish rock band

- Also known as: MadMax
- Origin: Warsaw, Poland
- Genre: Progressive rock
- Years active: 1976–1985
- Labels: MadMax, Polskie Nagrania Muza, Metal Mind
- Past members: Paweł Birula; Andrzej Puczyński; Wojciech Puczyński; Władysław Komendarek; Zbigniew Fyk; Marek Wójcicki; Jerzy Machnikowski; Kazimierz Barlasz; Jacek Olejnik; Bogdan Łoś; Joanna Rosińska

Exodus (also known as MadMax) was a Polish progressive rock band. It was formed in Warsaw in 1976 by brothers Andrzej Puczyński and Wojciech Puczyński and broke up in 1985. Considered a part of the "Music of the Young Generation", a trend in Polish rock music in the late 1970s and early 1980s, Exodus was one of the leading progressive rock bands in the Polish rock scene during their time. The band, by critics, were dubbed the "Polish Yes", due to their similar musical styles.

== History ==
=== 1976–1979: Recording of Nadzieje, Niepokoje, and early touring ===
In 1976, Exodus was formed by guitarist Andrzej Puczyński and Wojciech Puczyński. The band recorded their debut album, Nadzieje, Niepokoje, both at the Riviera-Remont club in Warsaw, and at Andrzej's home in 1977, and the album wasn't released until 2006 as a part of their compilation, The Most Beautiful Dream; Anthology 1977–1985. Although this album was not released at the time, shortly after recording this material, they performed over a dozen concerts around Poland. They performed at numerous events, such as the Polish Stage Fair in Łódź in 1977, the International Stage Spring in Poznań in 1978 and 1979, the Pop Session in Sopot in 1978, and the Musical Camping in Lubań in 1979. They often toured with the English pop band The Rubettes around Europe, such as the Soviet Union, West Germany, and Hungary.

=== 1980–1982: The Most Beautiful Day & Supernova ===
On 30 November 1980, Exodus released their debut studio album, The Most Beautiful Day. The album was recorded in February 1980 at the Polskie Radio Warszawa. The album was critically acclaimed, and was a commercial success with over 200,000 copies sold, achieving diamond status in Poland. Following the release of this album, the band was praised by readers of the Polish music magazine Non Stop.

In late 1982, Exodus released their second studio album, Supernova. The album was recorded in October-November 1981. The album was critically acclaimed, and was the No. 1 Polish rock album of 1983, with over 476,000 copies sold, achieving diamond status in Poland. The album features shorter track lengths, which was the result of trying to keep pace with new musical trends in the Polish rock scene, which listeners criticized this album for. They promoted the album with the leading single Jestem Automatem.

=== 1983–1985: Hazard, name change, and breakup ===
In 1983, Polish guitarist Marek Wójcicki joined Exodus, and in the same year, they recorded their third studio album Hazard, which, similar to their debut album, was also released in the compilation The Most Beautiful Dream; Anthology 1977–1985 in 2006. With the band's new lineup, they wanted to contribute to the "rock boom" trend in the Polish rock scene, which resulted in them playing more aggressive. In 1985, the band split and the lineup was reorganized. They briefly changed their name to MadMax, and the only traces of their work under this name are three songs recorded for a Polish radio station in Białystok, and a music video for the song Atak Serce.

In 1985, shortly after their name change, the band broke up. Keyboardist Władysław Komendarek began a solo career, and co-founder Andrzej Puczyński founded the independent Polish record label Izabelin Studios, and later became president of Universal Music Polska. In 1992, the album Exodus: Singles Collection was released on CD, which included all of Exodus' singles. In 2010, Polish pop singer Stachursky recorded a cover of Exodus' song Ponury pejzaż, and included it on his album Magnificent Polish Hits 2.

== Members ==
=== Past members ===
- Andrzej Puczyński – guitar
- Wojciech Puczyński – bass guitar
- Władysław Komendarek – keyboards
- Paweł Birula – vocals, 12-string guitar
- Zbigniew Fyk – drums
- Marek Wójcicki – guitar
- Kazimierz Barlasz – vocals
- Jacek Olejnik – keyboards
- Bogdan Łoś – guitar
- Joanna Rosińska – vocals

== Discography ==
=== Albums ===
- Nadzieje, niepokoje, (recorded 1977, released 2006 in The Most Beautiful Dream; Anthology 1977–1985)
- The Most Beautiful Day (1980)
- Supernova (1982)
- Singles Collection (1992)
- Najpiękniejszy dzień (2000)
- Hazard (recorded 1983, released 2006 in The Most Beautiful Dream; Anthology 1977–1985)

=== Singles ===
- Uspokojenie wieczorne/To co pamiętam (1978)
- Niedokończony sen/Dotyk szczęścia (1979)
- Ostatni teatrzyk objazdowy (część pierwsza)/Ostatni teatrzyk objazdowy (część druga) (1980)
- Spróbuj wznieść się wyżej/Jest taki dom (1981)
- Jestem automatem/Najdłuższy lot (1982)
- Kosmiczny ojcze/Ta frajda (1985)
