= Tilt (Polish band) =

Polish rock band

- Origin: Warsaw, Poland
- Genres: Punk rock
- Years active: 1979–present
- Members: Tomek Lipinski
- Past members: Tomasz Szczeciński; Jacek Lenartowicz; Tomasz Kożuchowski; Franz Dreadhunter; Tomasz Pierzchalski; Artur Hajdasz; Dariusz Malejonek; Marcin Ciempiel; Tomasz Czulak; Piotr Lewicki; Wojciech Konikiewicz; Karol Ludew; Piotr Leniewicz; Aleksander Korecki

Tilt is a Polish rock band who have been playing together on and off since 1979. They are regarded as one of the first punk bands in the nation, but as the founder mentioned in an interview, they were a post punk band from the beginning. Tilt was founded in Warsaw in 1979 by Tomasz Lipinski and it has continued to exist to the present day, with several breaks in between. In its first years, Tilt performed songs in English, later switching to Polish. Currently, they perform and record as Tomek Lipinski & Tilt, with Lipinski on guitar and vocals, Wojciech Konikiewicz on keyboards, Karol Ludew on drums, Piotr Leniewicz on bass, and Alek Korecki on saxophone.

== Name ==
The name comes from the penalty message "Tilt" in pinball machines, which is displayed after excessive "nudging", and in Polish gamers' parlance "to nudge" was actually "tiltować", "to tilt". As Lipinski explained, "We wanted to act on society in this way: to 'tilt' it."

== Selection of past and present members ==
Several members of the Polish punk scene have rotated through the band's ranks:

- Tomek Lipiński – vocals, guitar
- Tomasz Szczeciński – bass
- Jacek Lenartowicz – drums
- Tomasz "Gogo Szulc" Kożuchowski – drums
- Aleksander Korecki – saxophone
- Franz Dreadhunter – bass, keyboards
- Tomasz Pierzchalski – saxophone
- Artur Hajdasz – drums
- Dariusz Malejonek – bass
- Marcin Ciempiel – bass
- Tomasz Czulak – drums
- Piotr Lewicki – keyboards, guitar

== Discography ==
=== Albums ===
- Tilt (1988)
- Czad Kommando Tilt (1990)
- Rzeka miłości, koncert w Buffo '96 (1996 - live album)
- Emocjonalny terror (2002)
- Gwiazdy polskiej muzyki lat 80. (2007 - compilation album)
- TILT i Tomek Lipiński - przebojowa kolekcja DZIENNIKA (2007)

=== Singles ===
- "Runął już ostatni mur" (1985)
- "Za zamkniętymi drzwiami (Widziałem cię)"(1985 - featured on the compilation Fala)
- "Mówię ci, że..." (1986)
- "Co się stało w tym kraju nad Wisłą?" (2002)
