= Armia =

Polish punk rock band

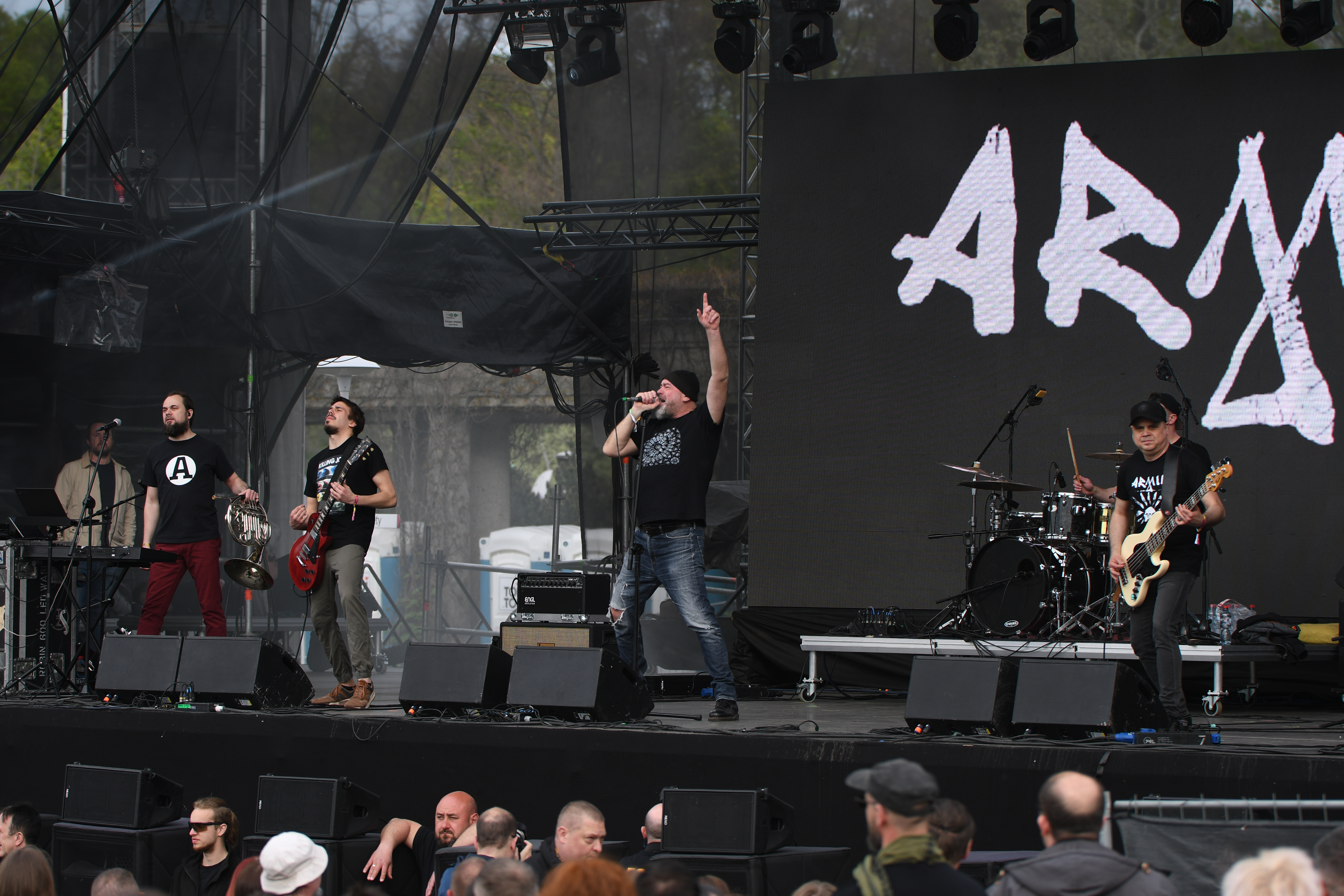
- Armia in 2023

Background information
- Origin: Poland
- Genres: Punk rock, hardcore punk, Christian punk, progressive punk
- Years active: 1984 - present
- Labels: Pronit, Wifon, SPV Poland, S.P. Records, Ars Mundi, Pomaton EMI, Metal Mind Productions, Isound Labels
- Members: Tomasz Budzyński; Jakub Bartoszewski; Daniel Karpiński; Paweł Piotrowski; Rafał Giec
- Website: www.armia.art.pl

Armia (English: Army) is a Polish punk rock band founded in 1985 by Tomasz Budzyński, Sławomir Gołaszewski and Robert Brylewski. Armia is famous for its use of horn, which was unusual of punk rock bands in late 1980s and 1990s. With poetic (often inspired by philosophy and literature) lyrics, written by Budzyński, and evolving, creative music Armia has gained popularity and respect over the years, and its concerts now attract numerous fans of rock music.

Armia's lyrics and cover art has frequently alluded to philosophy, literature and religion. The cover of the LP Legenda (A Legend) features Don Quijote and some lyrics were inspired by gnosticism. The title of the LP Czas i Byt (Being and Time) comes from Martin Heidegger's work Being and Time. Other sources of inspiration include the fiction of J. R. R. Tolkien, the Bible, The Divine Comedy and Samuel Beckett (Triodante), Tove Jansson's The Moomins, films like Werner Herzog's Aguirre, the Wrath of God or Marek Piwowski's Rejs.

Although the basis of Armia's sound has always been punk rock, the band's changing musicians have brought with them numerous other styles and material: hardcore, heavy metal, keyboard riffs, sampling, and complex, quasi-orchestral arrangements. Therefore, each of the band's albums sounds different from the rest.

== Band members ==
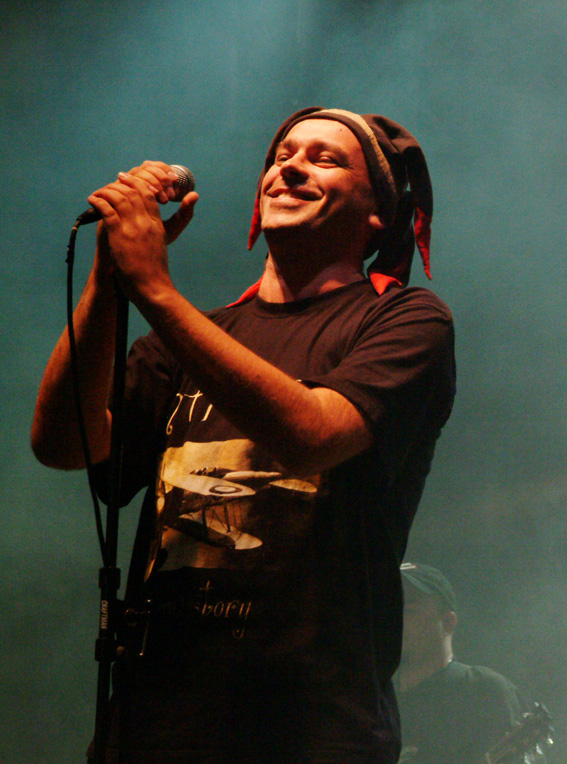
Tomasz Budzyński

=== Current ===
- Tomasz "Tom Bombadil, Budzy" Budzyński – vocals, guitars (1984–present)
- Jakub Bartoszewski – horn, keyboards (2002–present)
- Rafał "Frantz" Giec – guitars
- Amadeusz "Amade" Kaźmierczak – drums (2013–present)
- Dariusz Budkiewicz - bass (2014–present)

=== Former ===
- Sławomir "Merlin" Gołaszewski – clarinet (1984–1987)
- Tomasz "Żwirek" Żmijewski – bass guitar (1984–1988)
- Aleksander "Alik" Dziki – bass guitar (1985–1989)
- Krzysztof "Banan" Banasik – horn (1987–2009)
- Dariusz "Maleo" Malejonek – bass guitar (1990–1993)
- Krzysztof "Dr Kmieta" Kmiecik – bass guitar (1998–2011)
- Janusz "Grzmot" Rołt – drums (1984–1986)
- Piotr "Stopa" Żyżelewicz – drums (1985, 1989–1998, 2011)
- Beata Polak – drums (1998–2002)
- Tomasz "Gogo, Szulc" Kożuchowski – drums (1986–1989)
- Maciej "Ślepy" Głuchowski – drums (2003–2006)
- Tomasz "Krzyżyk" Krzyżaniak – drums (2006–2011)
- Robert "Afa, Bryl, Robin Goldrocker" Brylewski – guitars (1984–1993, died 2018)
- Paweł "Pablo" Piotrowski – bass guitar (1993–1998, 2011–2014)
- Michał Grymuza – guitars (1994–1995)
- Darek "Popkorn" Popowicz – guitars (1995–2005)
- Paweł Klimczak – guitars (1999–2010)
- Daniel "Karpiu" Karpiński – drums (2011–2012)

== Discography ==
=== Studio albums ===
Title	Album details	Peak chart positions
Title	Album details	POL
Armia	Released: June 13, 1988; Label: Pronit; Formats: CD, LP, CS	—
Legenda	Released: May 6, 1991; Label: Wifon; Formats: CD, LP, CS	—
Czas i byt	Released: November 13, 1993; Label: SPV Poland; Formats: CD, CS	—
Triodante	Released: November 15, 1994; Label: S.P. Records; Formats: CD, LP, CS	—
Duch	Released: November 24, 1997; Label: Ars Mundi; Formats: CD, CS	—
Droga	Released: September 13, 1999; Label: Ars Mundi; Formats: CD, CS	—
Pocałunek mongolskiego księcia	Released: October 27, 2003; Label: Pomaton EMI; Formats: CD, digital download	21
Ultima Thule	Released: January 31, 2005; Label: Metal Mind Productions; Formats: CD	5
Der Prozess	Released: January 28, 2009; Label: Isound Labels; Formats: CD	15
Freak	Released: November 30, 2009; Label: Isound Labels; Formats: CD	—
Podróż na Wschód	Released: November 27, 2012; Label: Isound Labels; Formats: CD	—
"—" denotes a recording that did not chart or was not released in that territory.

=== Live albums ===
Title	Album details	Peak chart positions
Title	Album details	POL
Exodus	Released: 1992; Label: Izabelin Studio; Formats: CD	—
Soul Side Story	Released: October 5, 2000; Label: Ars Mundi; Formats: CD	—
Przystanek Woodstock 2004	Released: June 11, 2007; Label: Złoty Melon; Formats: CD	50
Armia 25-lecie Zespołu XVI Przystanek Woodstock 2010	Released: December 9, 2010; Label: Złoty Melon; Formats: CD	—
Koncerty w Trójce vol. 02 - Armia	Released: April 8, 2013; Label: Polskie Radio; Formats: CD	—
"—" denotes a recording that did not chart or was not released in that territory.

=== Video albums ===
Title	Video details
Koncert na XX-lecie	Released: January 16, 2006; Label: Metal Mind Productions; Formats: DVD
Przystanek Woodstock 2004	Released: June 11, 2007; Label: Złoty Melon; Formats: DVD
