= TZN Xenna =

Polish punk rock band

- Origin: Poland
- Genres: Punk rock
- Years active: 1981–1987, 2011–present
- Labels: SP Tonpress; Migrena Records
- Members: Krzysztof Chojnacki; Marek Kucharski; Sidney; Tomasz Kożuchowski

TZN Xenna (Polish pronunciation: [ˌtɛt͡sɛtˈɛn ˈksɛna]) was one of the early Polish punk rock bands.

== Members ==
=== Current members ===
- Krzysztof „Zygzak” Chojnacki – (vocals) (1981–1983; 1984–1987; 2011 - present)
- Dariusz „Dynia” Dynowski – (drums) (1984–1987; 2011 - present)
- Wojtek „Tele Kesur” Rusak – (guitar) (2011 - present)
- Krzysztof „Panek” Pankiewicz – (bass) (2013 - present)
- Krzysztof Chojnacki Zygzak (vocals)

=== Past members ===
- Marek „Markus” Kucharski – (guitar) (1981–1982; 1984–1987)
- Piotr „Czombe” Dubiel – (bass) (1981)
- Tomasz „Gogo Szulc” Kożuchowski – (drums) (1981–1983)
- Jacek „Sydney” Zientała – (bass) (1981–1983)
- Andrzej „Falkonetti” Kuszpyt – (guitar) (1982–1983), (bass) (1984–1987)
- Robert „Mionek” Micorek – (guitar) (1986–1987)
- Tomasz „Klaus” Wrześniowski – (bass) (2011 - january 2013)

== History ==
TZN Xenna was founded in August 1981 in Warsaw by Zygzak, Gogo Szulc and Piotr Dubiel. The first name was Kamash and the Eckers. According to Marek, the name translated into English would be "That Means Xenna" (tzn translating as "that means" and xenna being just a word with no meaning, like a name).

Their first concert group had on September 11, 1981 in "Skarpa" club. In the same month band took part in new wave Festival in Toruń, but without success. In 1982, TZN Xenna performed on the "Rock Galicja" tour with the bands Dezerter and Deuter in southern Poland.
