= Pidżama Porno discography =

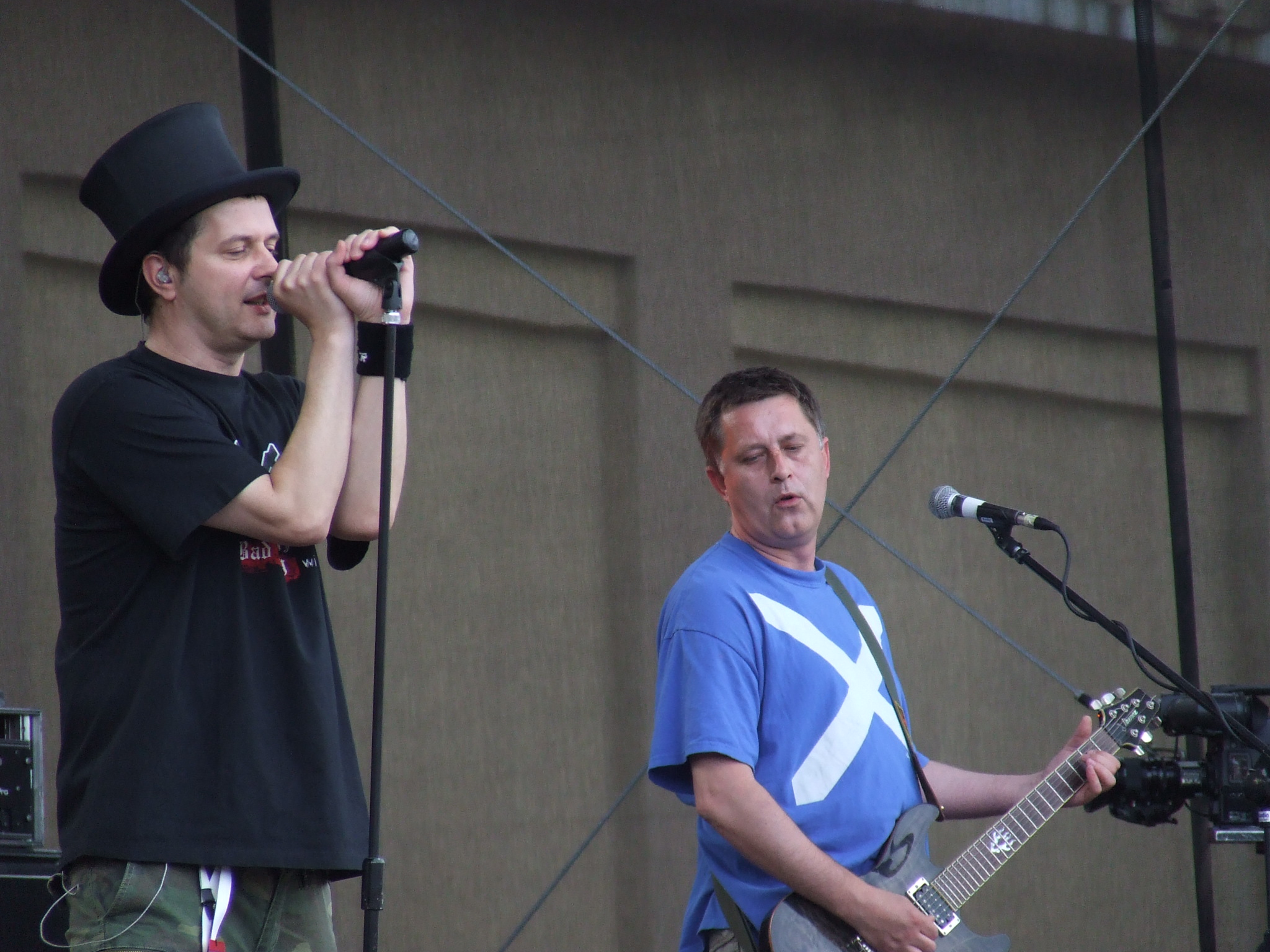
- Studio albums: 7
- Live albums: 2
- Singles: 9
- Video albums: 2
- Music videos: 12

The discography of Pidżama Porno, a Polish punk rock/alternative rock band, consists of nine studio albums, nine singles and two video albums. The band, who formed in Poznań in 1989, consists of vocalist Krzysztof Grabowski, guitarists Andrzej Kozakiewicz and Sławomir Mizerkiewicz, bassist Julian Piotrowiak and drummer Rafal Piotrowiak.

== Studio albums ==
Year	Album details	Reviews
1989	Ulice jak stygmaty: Released: 1989; Formats: cassette	-
1990	Futurista: Released: 1990; Formats: cassette, CD	-
1994	Zamiast burzy: Released: 1994; Formats: cassette	-
1997	Złodzieje zapalniczek: Released: 1997; Formats: CD, cassette	Teraz Rock
1998	Styropian: Released: 1998; Formats: CD, cassette	Teraz Rock
1999	Ulice jak stygmaty - absolutne rarytasy: Released: 1999; Formats: CD, cassette	Teraz Rock
2001	Marchef w butonierce: Released: 23 April 2001; Formats: CD, cassette	Teraz Rock
2004	Bulgarskie Centrum: Released: 2004; Formats: CD	Teraz Rock
2007	Zlodzieje zapalniczek - reedycja: Released: 2007; Formats: CD	Teraz Rock
2009	Styropian - reedycja: Released: 2009; Formats: CD	
2019	Sprzedawca jutra: Released: 2019; Formats: CD	

== Live albums ==
Year	Album details	Reviews
2002	Koncertówka part 1: Released: 2 September 2002; Format: CD	Teraz Rock
2003	Koncertówka 2. Drugi szczyt: Released: 10 June 2003; Format: CD	Teraz Rock

== Singles ==
Year	Title	Album
1998	"Do nieba wzieci"	Styropian
1998	"Outsider"	Ulice jak stygmaty - absolutne rarytasy
1999	"Katarzyna ma katar"	Ulice jak stygmaty - absolutne rarytasy
2001	"Twoja generacja"	Marchef w butonierce
2001	"Tom Petty spotyka Debbie Harry"	Marchef w butonierce
2001	"Bon ton na ostrzu noza"	Marchef w butonierce
2004	"Wirtualni chlopcy"	Bulgarskie Centrum
2004	"Nikt tak pieknie nie mówil, ze sie boi milosci"	Bulgarskie Centrum
2007	"Czekajac na trzesienie ziemi"	Zlodzieje zapalniczek - reedycja

== Music videos ==
Year	Title	Director
1997	"Bal u senatora'93"	Piotr and Malgorzata Maciejewski
1997	"Ezoteryczny Poznań"	Rafal Jerzak
1998	"Do nieba wzieci"	Piotr and Malgorzata Maciejewski
1998	"Gdy zostajesz u mnie na noc"	Piotr and Malgorzata Maciejewski
1999	"Katarzyna ma katar"	Piotr and Malgorzata Maciejewski
1999	"Outsider"	-
2001	"Twoja generacja"	-
2001	"Tom Petty spotyka Debbie Harry"	
2001	"Bon ton na ostrzu noza"	-
2004	"Wirtualni chlopcy"	Przemysław Młyńczyk
2004	"Nikt tak pieknie nie mówil, ze sie boi milosci"	Vahan Bego
2007	"Czekajac na trzesienie ziemi"	-

== Video releases ==
- Finalista (DVD: 2007) (tour video)
- Dwadzieścia (DVD: 2008)
