= Rock music in Poland =

Music genre or scene

Rock music in Poland began in the 20th century. Because Poland was a communist country at the time, the rock and punk scenes often symbolized anti-establishment attitudes.

== History ==
=== 1960s ===
After the era of Big-beat, (aka “big-bit", a Polish style of simple rock'n'roll), one of the earliest pioneers of Polish rock was Tadeusz Nalepa, a singer, guitarist and songwriter who began his career playing pop music in his group - Blackout, before turning to blues rock and changing the band's name to Breakout in 1968. Their debut album Na drugim brzegu tęcz", is often referred to as the "first Polish rock album".

Significant Big-beat artists include Czerwone Gitary, Niebiesko-Czarni, Czerwono-Czarni, Trubadurzy, and Karin Stanek.

=== 1970s ===
In the 1970s, due to political pressure and censorship, few bands managed to gain commercial success or become artistically notable.

1970s artists included: Niemen, Budka Suflera, SBB, Marek Grechuta (artist on the edge of rock, usually not of that genre), Skaldowie. Breakout recorded and released their most successful album, Blues in 1971. Among these bands who achieved local success but never managed to gain international recognition despite their quality, were Grupa Stress and Nurt, which were more on the hard-rock psychedelic, progressive side.

=== 1980s ===
1982 was the beginning of the "boom of rock" in Poland - featuring debuts or first success of many important bands. On 24.04.1982 Lista Przebojów Programu Trzeciego was first broadcast, a voting chart that helped promote many bands. Underground artists were promoted at Rozgłośnia Harcerska.

From 1987 to 1990 - the crisis of rock - many artists emigrated, bands broke up, split or were suspended. Meanwhile, a second wave of Polish rock called Krajowa Scena Młodzieżowa (Sztywny Pal Azji, Chłopcy z Placu Broni, Róże Europy, Kobranocka, Tilt, Mr. Zoob, Rezerwat), but with minor market/artistic success.

==== Artists ====
The so-called GREAT FOUR were Perfect, Republika, Lady Pank, Maanam. Other: Oddział Zamknięty, Lombard, TSA, Bajm (mostly active and popular in the 2000s),

The underground scene included Kult, Dezerter, Brygada Kryzys, Klaus Mitffoch, Dżem, T.Love Alternative, Turbo, Aya RL, Izrael, Daab, Kat, Lessdress (debuted in 1989.)

=== 1990s ===
1992-1995 featured the second boom of Polish rock, including many female vocalists.

From 1997 until the mid-2000s, Polish rock "went underground", disappearing from commercial media, despite many artistic successes and fan attention.

Significant 1990s artists were Wilki, Myslovitz, Acid Drinkers, Homo Twist, Vader, Voo Voo, Armia, Sweet Noise, Kazik/Kazik Na Żywo, and Ira. Female rockers included Hey, Edyta Bartosiewicz, Kasia Kowalska, and O.N.A., Closterkeller.

New success came for Kult, Dżem, T.Love (after changing style from punk to rock shortened its name from T.Love Alternative), as well as further success for Perfect, Republika, Lady Pank, and Maanam.

=== 2000s ===
Significant 2000s artists included Myslovitz, Kult, Hey, Dżem, Wilki, Cool Kids of Death, Coma, Lao Che, Pogodno, Ścianka, Vader, Behemoth, Voo Voo, Lech Janerka, Strachy na Lachy, Krzysztof Wałecki (as a solo artist, with Vintage, and Oddział Zamknięty), Darek Pietrzak, Acid Drinkers, and Riverside.

Poland maintained an active underground extreme metal Music Scene. Some of the bands are Vader, Behemoth, Yattering, Decapitated and Lux Occulta. This paved the way for a large underground movement. One of the biggest death metal record labels in Poland is Metal Mind Records.

== Literature ==
- Leszek Gnoiński, Jan Skaradziński. "Encyklopedia polskiego rocka", In Rock, 2006
- Marek Niedźwiecki. "Lista przebojów", Wydawnictwo Wacław Bagiński, Wrocław 2006
- Marek Niedźwiecki. "Lista przebojów Trójki 1994-2006", Prószyński i s-ka, 2006
