= Ulice jak stygmaty – absolutne rarytasy =

Ulice jak stygmaty - absolutne rarytasy

Studio album by Pidzama Porno
- Released: 1999
- Recorded: Studio CZAD, Swarzedz
- Genre: Punk rock
- Length: 51:54
- Label: S.P.

Pidzama Porno chronology
Styropian (1998)	Ulice jak stygmaty - absolutne rarytasy (1999)	Marchef w butonierce (2001)

Singles from Ulice jak stygmaty - absolutne rarytasy
- 1. "Outsider" Released: 1998; 2. "Katarzyna ma katar" Released: 1999

Ulice jak stygmaty – absolutne rarytasy – Pidzama Porno's sixth album, released in 1999 by S.P. Records. This CD contains new versions of old Pidzama's songs, also some songs which had not been written by Grabaż – "Nimfy (Baby)" by the words of Anatol Stern, "Dłoń, która podpisała papier" – by the words of Dylan Thomas (translated by poet Stanisław Barańczak) and "Outsider" – a song originally made by T.Love, written by Muniek Staszczyk, personally a friend of Krzysztof "Grabaz" Grabowski. The album was recorded in Studio CZAD in Swarzedz.

== Track listing ==
No.	Title	Length
1.	"Tak jak teraz jest"	2:54
2.	"Katarzyna ma katar"	3:09
3.	"Szalone lato"	2:12
4.	"Outsider"	3:40
5.	"Dłoń która podpisała papier"	3:18
6.	"Kocięta i szczenięta"	5:04
7.	"Nimfy (Baby)"	4:10
8.	"Fucking in the church"	2:31
9.	"Ciemne jak tęcza"	2:19
10.	"Lewą marsz"	2:29
11.	"Trzymając się za ręce"	2:03
12.	"Grudniowy blues o Bukareszcie"	3:29
13.	"Ballada o krwi prawdziwej"	3:01
14.	"Browarne bulwary"	6:01
15.	"Trzymając się za ręce (soft)"	2:47
16.	"Welwetowe swetry (Polip)"	2:47

== Videos ==
- "Katarzyna ma katar"
- [llk5io55rr

"Outsider"]

== The band ==
- Krzysztof "Grabaż" Grabowski – vocal
- Andrzej "Kozak" Kozakiewicz – guitar, vocal on track 13
- Sławek "Dziadek" Mizerkiewicz – guitar
- Julian "Julo" Piotrowiak – bass guitar
- Rafał "Kuzyn" Piotrowiak – drums

and also:

- Ropuch – guitar
- Jacek Kortylewicz – tube
- Piotr "Malina" Maliński – klarnet
