= Koncertówka part 1 =

Live album by Pidżama Porno
- Released: 2 September 2002
- Genre: Punk rock
- Length: 1:12:09
- Label: S.P.

Pidżama Porno chronology
Marchef w butonierce (2001)	Koncertówka part 1 (2002)	Koncertówka 2. Drugi szczyt (2003)

Koncertówka part 1 is Pidżama Porno's first bootleg, and their eighth in career album, released on 2 September, 2002. This album contains tracks recorded on XII birthday in Poznań - December 2000 (tracks 1–15). Tracks no 16 and 17 are from Proxima - October 2001. Track no 18 is a sample from the movie Wodzirej.

== Track listing ==
No.	Title	Length
1.	"Miejscy Partyzanci"	2:26
2.	"Brudna Forsa"	4:07
3.	"Poznańskie Dziewczęta"	2:58
4.	"28 (One Love)"	5:53
5.	"Kocięta & Szczenięta"	5:03
6.	"Bal u Senatora '93"	3:56
7.	"Święty Szczyt (feat. Robert Brylewski)"	4:18
8.	"Spokój w Głowach"	2:21
9.	"Jesienna Deprecha"	3:34
10.	"Nie Mam Jaj/Skarby Watykanu (feat. Tymon Tymański & Robert Brylewski)"	8:35
11.	"Katarzyna ma Katar"	3:09
12.	"Gdy zostaniesz u mnie na Noc"	5:01
13.	"Do nieba wzięci (feat.Zygmunt Staszczyk)"	4:40
14.	"Outsider (feat.Zygmunt Staszczyk)"	4:14
15.	"News From Tienanmen"	3:22
16.	"Bon Ton na Ostrzu Noża"	3:56
17.	"Gorzka"	3:52
18.	"Dźwięki Piosenki"	0:44

== The band ==
- Krzysztof "Grabaż" Grabowski – vocal
- Andrzej "Kozak" Kozakiewicz – guitar
- Sławek "Dziadek" Mizerkiewicz – guitar
- Julian "Julo" Piotrowiak – bass guitar
- Rafał "Kuzyn" Piotrowiak – drums

=== Guests ===
- Robert Brylewski
- Tymon Tymanski
- Zygmunt Staszczyk
