= Futurista (Pidżama Porno album) =

Studio album by Pidzama Porno
- Released: 1990
- Genre: Punk rock
- Length: 43:54
- Label: MAMI Tapes

Pidzama Porno chronology
Ulice jak stygmaty (1989)	Futurista (1990)	Zamiast burzy (1994)

Futurista is the title of Pidzama Porno's second album, released in 1996 by MAMI Tapes. The work has been around since 1990 though, as the material was circulating on pirated tapes. Marcin Swietlicki said this album is a "Miraculously recovered, missing part in Polish rock"

== Track listing ==
No.	Title	Length
1.	"Gnijąca modelka w taxi"	3:28
2.	"Miejscy partyzanci"	2:29
3.	"Hymn pokoju"	4:20
4.	"Strzelaj lub emigruj"	2:49
5.	"Kilka zdań o Hitlerjugend"	2:17
6.	"Permanentna rewolucja"	2:18
7.	"News from Tienanmen"	2:50
8.	"Kocięta i szczenięta"	5:14
9.	"Co za dzień"	3:58
10.	"Maszerujemy naprzód (Odlotowa Dorota)"	2:44
11.	"Pasażer"	3:00
12.	"Film o końcu świata"	3:12
13.	"Ulice jak stygmaty"	5:02

== The band ==
- Krzysztof "Grabaż" Grabowski – vocal
- Andrzej "Kozak" Kozakiewicz – guitar, vocal
- Sławek "Dziadek" Mizerkiewicz – guitar, chords
- Rafał "Kuzyn" Piotrowiak – drums
- Julian "Julo" Piotrowiak - bass guitar
- Filary - guitars, keyboard, sampler.

and:

- Kasia Nosowska - chords
- Lenin - chords
- Rysiek Sarbak - trumpet
- Fiolet - sax
