= Koncertówka 2. Drugi szczyt =

Live album by Pidzama Porno
- Released: June 10, 2003
- Genre: Punk rock
- Length: 1:14:17
- Label: S.P. Records

Pidzama Porno chronology
Koncertówka part 1 (2002)	Koncertówka 2. Drugi szczyt (2003)	Bulgarskie Centrum (2004)

Koncertówka 2. Drugi szczyt – Pidzama Porno's second bootleg and their ninth album in their whole career. It was released on 10 June 2003. This album contains tracks from XIV birthday concert in Poznań (tracks 3,4,5,7), track no 2 comes from the concert in Proxima, from December 2000. The rest of the tracks (except track no 1 - a sample from a movie called "Wodzirej") come from XIII birthday in Gwint in Białystok.

== Track listing ==
No.	Title	Length
1.	"Dźwięki piosenki"	0:23
2.	"Co za dzień"	3:49
3.	"Taksówki w poprzek czasu"	2:39
4.	"Plakat (feat. Robert Matera)"	3:21
5.	"Pryszcze"	4:54
6.	"To co czujesz to co wiesz (feat. Kasia Nosowska)"	7:13
7.	"Józef K. (feat. Marcin Swietlicki)"	5:40
8.	"Chłopcy z huty (feat. Marcin Swietlicki)"	3:56
9.	"Terrorystka Gloria (feat. Marcin Świetlicki)"	7:34
10.	"Spokój i ręce"	9:30
11.	"Antifa"	3:11
12.	"Styropian"	3:17
13.	"Ezoteryczny Poznań"	5:16
14.	"Stąpając po niepewnym gruncie (feat. Kasia Nosowska)"	5:07
15.	"Welwetowe swetry"	3:01
16.	"Pasażer"	5:24

== The band ==
- Krzysztof "Grabaż" Grabowski – vocal
- Andrzej "Kozak" Kozakiewicz – guitar
- Sławek "Dziadek" Mizerkiewicz – guitar
- Julian "Julo" Piotrowiak – bass guitar
- Rafał "Kuzyn" Piotrowiak – drums

Guests:

- Kasia Nosowska
- Marcin Świetlicki
- Robert Matera
- Łoś
- Semen
