= Dwadzieścia =

Video by Pidzama Porno
- Released: December 5, 2008
- Recorded: December 1, 2007
- Genre: Punk rock
- Label: S.P. Records

Pidzama Porno chronology
Finalista - DVD (2007)	Dwadzieścia (2008)	Styropian - reedycja (2009)

Professional ratings
Review scores
Source	Rating
onet.pl	4/5 stars

Dwadzieścia (2008) is the second concert DVD of the punk rock band Pidzama Porno. Almost the whole of the material was recorded in Warsaw, in Palladium Club. This DVD also shows two bonus tracks from Pidzama's last concert in Poznań.

== Track list ==
- 01. Co za dzień
- 02. Marchef w butonierce,
- 03. Xero z kota,
- 04. Wieczność feat. Spięty
- 05. Film o końcu świata
- 06. 28 (One love)
- 07. Nimfy (Baby) feat. Renata Przemyk
- 08. Kocięta i szczenięta
- 09. Odlotowa Dorota,
- 10. Bal o senatora '93,
- 11. Grudniowy blues o Bukareszcie
- 12. Chłopcy idą na wojnę feat. Spięty
- 13. Doniebawzięci,
- 14. Ezoteryczny Poznań,
- Bisy:
- 15. Wojna nie jest Twoim stanem naturalnym
- 16. Harbour Of The Soul
- 17. Egzystencjalny paw
- 18. Twoja generacja
- 19. Welwetowe swetry
- 20. Antifa
- 21. Pasażerski
- Poznan bonus:
- 1. Czas czas czas
- 2. Droga na Brześć

== The band ==
- Krzysztof "Grabaż" Grabowski - vocal
- Andrzej "Kozak" Kozakiewicz - guitar, vocal
- Sławek "Dziadek" Mizerkiewicz - guitar
- Rafał "Kuzyn" Piotrowiak - drums
- Julian "Julo" Piotrowiak - bass guitar

Guests:

- Spiety (Lao Che)
- Renata Przemyk
