= Styropian =

Studio album by Pidżama Porno
- Released: 1998
- Recorded: Studio CZAD, Swarzedz
- Genre: Punk rock
- Length: 1:02:42
- Label: S.P.

Pidżama Porno chronology
Złodzieje zapalniczek (1997)	Styropian (1998)	Ulice jak stygmaty - absolutne rarytasy (1999)

Singles from Styropian
- 1. "Do nieba wzieci" Released: 1998

Styropian – Pidżama Porno's fifth album, released in 1998 by S.P. Records. Album was recorded in Studio CZAD in Swarzędz.

== Track listing ==
No.	Title	Length
1.	"Spokój w głowach"	2:33
2.	"Styropian"	3:18
3.	"Do nieba wzięci"	4:21
4.	"Gorzka"	3:17
5.	"Koka, koka"	3:45
6.	"Złodziej zapalniczek"	3:23
7.	"Antifa"	4:01
8.	"Gloria"	6:09
9.	"Gdy zostajesz u mnie na noc"	4:58
10.	"Wściekła Mariola"	3:03
11.	"Durna 6 / Mądra 11"	3:26
12.	"Wieczność"	3:33
13.	"Między czarnym i czerwonym"	5:44
14.	"Spokój i ręce"	8:46
15.	"Welwetowe swetry"	2:25

== Videos ==
- "Do nieba wzięci"
- "Gdy zostajesz u mnie na noc"

== The band ==
- Krzysztof "Grabaż" Grabowski – vocal
- Andrzej "Kozak" Kozakiewicz – guitar, vocal
- Sławek "Dziadek" Mizerkiewicz – guitar, chords
- Rafał "Kuzyn" Piotrowiak – drums
- Julian "Julo" Piotrowiak – bass guitar

and also:

- Marcin Świetlicki – the voice in "Gloria"
- Sowa – flute
- Adaś z Jafii N. – keyboard
- Maciek Szpalik – akordeon
- Dusiołek – bass guitar
- Jacek K.: clapping

orchestra:

- Rafał Wiśniewski – trumpet
- Maciej Kociński – medium sax
- Maciej Kołodziejski – trombone
- and the Marx Brothers
