= Styropian – reedycja =

Styropian - reedycja

Studio album by Pidzama Porno
- Released: 2009
- Recorded: Studio CZAD, Swarzedz
- Genre: Punk rock
- Length: 56:58
- Label: S.P.

Pidzama Porno chronology
Dwadzieścia - DVD (2008)	Styropian - reedycja (2009)	Sprzedawca jutra (2019)

Styropian – reedycja is the new version of Pidzama Porno's album, previously released in 1998. Remastered and issued by SP Records, it contains bonus tracks and a video clip to "Do nieba wzieci". The band used the original magnetic tapes from the studio to recreate the sound from the start. The result is similar to an ear wash – more details can be heard. The sound was only modified, nothing new was added.

== Track listing ==
No.	Title	Length
1.	"Spokój w głowach"	2:33
2.	"Styropian"	3:18
3.	"Do nieba wzięci"	4:21
4.	"Gorzka"	3:17
5.	"Koka, koka"	3:45
6.	"Złodziej zapalniczek"	3:23
7.	"Antifa"	4:01
8.	"Gloria"	6:09
9.	"Gdy zostajesz u mnie na noc"	4:58
10.	"Wściekła Mariola"	3:03
11.	"Durna 6 / Mądra 11"	3:26
12.	"Wieczność"	3:33
13.	"Między czarnym i czerwonym"	5:44
14.	"Spokój i ręce"	8:46
15.	"Welwetowe swetry"	2:25

== Videos ==
- "Do nieba wzięci" on YouTube

== Personnel ==
- Krzysztof "Grabaż" Grabowski – vocals
- Andrzej "Kozak" Kozakiewicz – guitar, vocals
- Sławek "Dziadek" Mizerkiewicz – guitar, chords
- Rafał "Kuzyn" Piotrowiak – drums
- Julian "Julo" Piotrowiak – bass guitar

and also:

- Marcin Świetlicki – the voice in "Gloria"
- Sowa – flute
- Adaś z Jafii N. – keyboard
- Maciek Szpalik – akordeon
- Dusiołek – bass guitar
- Jacek K.: clapping

orchestra:

- Rafał Wiśniewski – trumpet
- Maciej Kociński – medium sax
- Maciej Kołodziejski – trombone
- and the Marx Brothers
