= Bulgarskie Centrum =

Bułgarskie Centrum

Studio album by Pidżama Porno
- Released: 2004
- Genre: Punk rock
- Length: 53:11
- Label: S.P.

Pidżama Porno chronology
Koncertówka 2. Drugi szczyt (2003)	Bułgarskie Centrum (2004)	Zlodzieje zapalniczek – reedycja (2007)

Singles from Bułgarskie Centrum
- 1. "Wirtualni chłopcy" Released: 2004; 2. "Nikt tak pięknie nie mówi, że się boi miłości" Released: 2004

Bułgarskie Centrum was Pidżama Porno's tenth studio album. It was released in 2004 by S.P. Records. The CD included 8 new tracks and 4 covers: "Wódka" by Kult (band), "Rockin' in the Free World" by Neil Young, and two of Grabaz older songs: "Każdy nowy dzień" (1992) and "Józef K." (1984).

== Track listing ==
No.	Title	Length
1.	"Każdy nowy dzień rodzi nowe paranoje"	3:54
2.	"Koszmarów 4 pary"	3:43
3.	"Bułgarskie Centrum Hujozy"	3:58
4.	"Wódka"	3:03
5.	"Egzystencjalny paw"	4:02
6.	"Wirtualni chłopcy"	3:46
7.	"Józef K."	5:23
8.	"Rockin' In The Free World"	3:53
9.	"Kotów kat ma oczy zielone"	4:26
10.	"Nikt tak pięknie nie mówił że się boi miłości"	6:14
11.	"Nie wszystko co pozytywne jest legalne"	4:44
12.	"Droga na Brześć"	6:05

== The band ==
- Krzysztof "Grabaż" Grabowski - vocal
- Andrzej "Kozak" Kozakiewicz - guitar, vocal
- Sławek "Dziadek" Mizerkiewicz - guitar
- Rafał "Kuzyn" Piotrowiak - drums
- Julian "Julo" Piotrowiak - bass guitar

and also:

- Arek Rejda (Pan Areczek) - akordeon
- Tom Horn - keyboard
- Anemio Anemow (Anem) - chords
