= Złodzieje zapalniczek =

Studio album by Pidzama Porno
- Released: 1997
- Recorded: Studio CZAD, Swarzedz
- Genre: Punk rock
- Length: 50:28
- Label: S.P. Records

Pidzama Porno chronology
Zamiast burzy (1994)	Złodzieje zapalniczek (1997)	Styropian (1998)

Professional ratings
Review scores
Source	Rating
Teraz Rock	3.5/5 stars

Złodzieje zapalniczek (Lighter thieves) – Pidzama Porno's fourth studio album, released in 1997 by S.P. Records. The material was recorded in Studio CZAD in Swarzedz. In 2007 the material was re-recorded and reissued in "Zlodzieje zapalniczek - reedycja".

== Track listing ==
No.	Title	Length
1.	"Gnijąca modelka w taksówce"	3:05
2.	"Ezoteryczny Poznań"	4:21
3.	"28 (One Love)"	5:41
4.	"Stąpając po niepewnym gruncie"	4:42
5.	"Poznańskie dziewczęta"	3:53
6.	"Xero z kota"	3:42
7.	"Czas, czas, czas"	6:00
8.	"Czekając na trzęsienie ziemi"	3:53
9.	"Porządek panuje w Warszawie"	3:06
10.	"Bal u senatora '93"	3:49
11.	"Film o końcu świata"	3:54
12.	"Nasze nogi są jak z gumy"	3:54

== Videos ==
- "Ezoteryczny Poznań"
- "Bal u senatora '93"

== Personnel ==
- Krzysztof "Grabaż" Grabowski – vocal
- Andrzej "Kozak" Kozakiewicz – guitar, vocal
- Sławek "Dziadek" Mizerkiewicz – guitar, chords
- Rafał "Kuzyn" Piotrowiak – drums
- Jacek Kąkolewski – bas guitar

and also:

- Witek Niedziejko – saxophone
- Tom "Wailer" Restis – trumpet
- Jah Jah – vocal
- Mikołaj Wojtaszewski – special effects
