= Klaus Mitffoch (album) =

Studio album by Klaus Mitffoch
- Released: 1984; 2003 (remastered)
- Recorded: March 1984
- Genre: Post punk
- Length: 38:14 (LP); 47:39 (CD)
- Label: Tonpress; MTJ

Klaus Mitffoch chronology
Klaus Mitffoch (1984)	Mordoplan (1988)

Klaus Mitffoch is a 1984 album by the Polish rock band Klaus Mitffoch. The album contains principally elements of British new wave as well as Gang of Four-inspired post punk. It received several awards and it is considered to be one of the most important albums in the history of Polish rock.

== Track listing ==
1. "Śpij aniele mój" (Sleep, my angel) – 0:30
2. "O głowie" (About head) – 2:23
3. "Wiązanka pieśni bojowych" (A mix of battle songs) – 1:29
4. "Nie jestem z nikim" (I'm not with nobody) – 2:16
5. "Klus Mitroh" – 3:39
6. "Wiązanka cz. IV" (A mix, part 4) – 1:24
7. "Jestem tu, jestem tam" (I'm here, I'm there) – 2:18
8. "Muł pancerny" (Panzer mule) – 3:19
9. "Powinność kurdupelka" (Manlet's duty) – 2:05
10. "Strzelby" (Shotguns) – 0:36
11. "Nad ranem śmierć się śmieje" (Death laughs in the morning) – 2:10
12. "Tutaj wesoło" (Funny here) – 3:19
13. "Ewolucja, rewolucja i ja" (Evolution, revolution and me) – 2:13
14. "Dla twojej głowy komfort" (Comfort for your head) – 3:48
15. "Siedzi" (Sitting) – 2:14
16. "Strzeż się tych miejsc" (Beware of these places) – 5:18

CD bonus tracks

17. "Ogniowe strzelby" (Fiery shotguns) – 2:50
18. "Śmielej" (Bravely) – 3:31
19. "Jezu, jak się cieszę" (Jesus, I'm so glad) – 2:09

== Personnel ==
=== Klaus Mittfoch ===
- Lech Janerka – Vocal, Bass, Lyrics
- Wiesław Mrozik – Guitar
- Krzysztof Pociecha – Guitar
- Marek Puchała – Drum kit

=== Guest Musicians ===
- Wojciech Konikiewicz – keyboards

=== Technical ===
- Włodzimierz Kowalczyk – engineering
- Tadeusz Czechak – assistant engineer
- Artur Gołacki – cover
- Bożena Janerka - lyrics
