= Marchef w butonierce =

Studio album by Pidżama Porno
- Released: April 23, 2001
- Recorded: Studio CZAD, Swarzedz
- Genre: Punk rock
- Length: 1:10:04
- Label: S.P.

Pidżama Porno chronology
Ulice jak stygmaty - absolutne rarytasy (1999)	Marchef w butonierce (2001)	Koncertówka part 1 (2002)

Singles from Marchef w butonierce
- 1. "Twoja generacja" Released: 2001; 2. "Tom Petty spotyka Debbie Harry" Released: 2001; 3. "Bon ton na ostrzu noza" Released: 2001

Marchef w butonierce – Pidżama Porno's seventh album, released 23 April 2001 by S.P. Records.

== Track listing ==
No.	Title	Length
1.	"Twoja generacja"	3:27
2.	"Marchef w butonierce"	3:26
3.	"Chłopcy idą na wojnę"	4:19
4.	"Tom Petty spotyka Debbie Harry"	4:12
5.	"Taksówki w poprzek czasu"	2:58
6.	"Bon ton na ostrzu noża"	3:49
7.	"Nocjaknoc"	5:11
8.	"Brudna forsa"	4:14
9.	"Pryszcze"	4:14
10.	"Zabiłem go"	3:00
11.	"Idą brunatni"	4:59
12.	"Chcąc pokonać Babilon"	3:31
13.	"Nocny gość"	6:05
14.	"Przed A (Następna stacja)"	0:11
15.	"A) Tom Petty potyka się o Debbie Harry – wersja żywa"	4:16
16.	"B) Taksówki bez – wersja ze Studia Czad"	2:54
17.	"C) Babilon – Swarzędz Travel All Inclusive"	3:12
18.	"D) Nocny gość – wersja Wampira Janowskiego"	6:06

== Videos ==
- "Twoja Generacja"
- "Tom Petty spotyka Debbie Harry"
- "Bon Ton na Ostrzu Noża"

== The band ==
- Krzysztof "Grabaż" Grabowski – vocal
- Andrzej "Kozak" Kozakiewicz – guitar, vocal
- Sławek "Dziadek" Mizerkiewicz – guitar
- Rafał "Kuzyn" Piotrowiak – drums
- Julian "Julo" Piotrowiak – bass guitar

and also:

- Łoś – sax and chords
- Semen – sax
- Szkodnik – trumpet
- Piotr Korzeniowski – trumpet
- Sławomir Janowski – keyboard
- Arkadiusz Rejda – accordion
- Agnieszka Gładyszak – violin
- Bartosz Liczbański – mandoline
