= Finalista =

Video by Pidzama Porno
- Released: 26 November 2007
- Genre: Punk rock
- Label: S.P. Records

Pidzama Porno chronology
Zlodzieje zapalniczek – reedycja (2007)	Finalista (2007)	Dwadzieścia (2008)

Finalista is the first concert DVD of the Polish punk rock band Pidzama Porno. This album was released at 26 November 2007. The material was recorded in three places: Wrocław, Kraków and Warsaw. This DVD includes many interviews with the band and technicians.

== Track list ==
1. Czas, Czas, Czas
2. Czekajac na trzesienie ziemi
3. Bulgarskie Centrum Hujozy
4. Taksowki w poprzek czasu
5. Outsider
6. Gdy zostajesz u Mnie na noc
7. Katarzyna Ma Katar
8. Koszmarow 4 pary
9. News form Tienanmen
10. Gorzka
11. Pryszcze
12. Ulice Jak Stygmaty
13. Chlopcy Ide na Wojne
14. Styropian
15. Droga Na Brzesc

Bonus:

16. Kotow Kat ma oczy zielone
17. Nikt tak pieknie nie mowil, ze sie boi milosci

== Band ==
- Krzysztof Grabowski – vocal
- Andrzej Kozakiewicz – guitar, vocal
- Slawomir Mizerkiewicz – guitar
- Rafal Piotrowiak – drums
- Julian Piotrowiak – bass guitar

Guests:

- Gutek (Indios Bravos)
- Tomasz Klaptocz (Akurat)
