= Zamiast burzy =

EP by Pidzama Porno
- Released: 1994
- Recorded: Studia CZAD, Swarzedz
- Genre: Punk rock
- Length: 15:19

Pidzama Porno chronology
Futurista (1990)	Zamiast burzy (1994)	Złodzieje zapalniczek (1997)

Zamiast burzy is the third album from Pidżama Porno. It was a maxisingle released in 1994. It contains four tracks recorded in Studio CZAD in Swarzędz.

== Track listing ==
No.	Title	Length
1.	"Gdy zostajesz u mnie na noc"	4:20
2.	"Trzymając się za ręce"	2:38
3.	"Poznańskie dziewczęta"	4:41
4.	"Maszerujemy naprzód (Odlotowa Dorota)"	3:40

== Personnel ==
- Krzysztof "Grabaż" Grabowski – vocal
- Andrzej "Kozak" Kozakiewicz – guitar, vocal
- Sławek "Dziadek" Mizerkiewicz – guitar, chords
- Rafał "Kuzyn" Piotrowiak – drums
- Jacek Kąkolewski – bass
