= Ulice jak stygmaty =

Studio album by Pidzama Porno
- Released: 1989
- Recorded: Osrodek Kultury "Słońce", Poznań
- Genre: Punk rock
- Length: 1:10:49

Pidzama Porno chronology
Ulice jak stygmaty (1989)	Futurista (1990)

Ulice jak stygmaty was Pidzama Porno's first album, released in 1989. It was recorded at Ośrodek Kultury "Słońce" in Poznań.

== Track listing ==
No.	Title	Length
1.	"Pasażer"	3:36
2.	"Lewą marsz"	3:16
3.	"Ballada o krwi prawdziwej"	3:17
4.	"Kiedy Praży się Paryż"	3:06
5.	"Browarne Bulwary"	4:31
6.	"Porządek panuje w Warszawie"	4:12
7.	"Bal u Senatora '85"	3:40
8.	"Trzymając się za ręce"	2:25
9.	"Tak jak teraz jest"	3:07
10.	"Terrorystka Frania"	6:06
11.	"Piosenka o 11 różowych jajach słonia"	3:54
12.	"Tyle dróg"	3:58
13.	"Fucking in the Church"	1:40
14.	"Katarzyna ma katar"	3:50
15.	"Codzienność"	3:23
16.	"Wojna nie jest twoim stanem naturalnym"	4:17
17.	"Świńska procesja"	4:32
18.	"List do żołnierza"	4:16
19.	"Welwetowe swetry"	3:43

== The band ==
- Krzysztof "Grabaż" Grabowski - vocal
- Ropuch - guitar
- Andrzej "Kozak" Kozakiewicz - bass guitar, vocal
- Rafał "Kuzyn" Piotrowiak - drums
- Filary - keyboard
