= Futurista =

Futurista may refer to:

- Futurista (Ryuichi Sakamoto album), 1986
- Futurista (Pidżama Porno album), Polish-language album 1996
- Ferenc Futurista (1891-1947), Czechoslovak film actor
- Delta Futurista, a modern version of the Lancia Delta Integrale manufactured by Automobili Amos
