= Blues (Breakout album) =

Studio album by Breakout
- Released: February 1971 (LP) (Poland); 2000 (CD)
- Recorded: February 1–9, 1971
- Genres: Blues rock, Hard rock
- Length: 36:59
- Labels: Polskie Nagrania "Muza", Yesterday

Breakout chronology
70a (1970)	Blues (1971)	Mira (1971)

Blues is the fourth studio album by Polish blues rock band Breakout. It was released in February 1971 in Poland through Polskie Nagrania "Muza", and re-released by the same label in 1986, 2005 (CD) and 2007. Another CD version of the album was released in 2000 through Yesterday Records. The cover art and photos was created by Marek A. Karewicz. Blues is often considered the best album of Breakout's career.

Blues is considered to be one of the most important albums in the history of Polish rock.

== Track listing ==
- Lyrics by Bogdan Loebl. Music by Tadeusz Nalepa.

No.	Title	Length
1.	"Ona poszła inną drogą" (eng. She went a different road)	3:35
2.	"Kiedy byłem małym chłopcem" (eng. When I was a little boy)	3:10
3.	"Oni zaraz przyjdą tu" (eng. They'll be here any minute)	3:00
4.	"Przyszła do mnie bieda" (eng. Misery came to me)	2:00
5.	"Pomaluj moje sny" (eng. Colour my dreams)	2:45
6.	"Usta me ogrzej" (eng. Warm up my lips)	4:07
7.	"Gdybym był wichrem" (eng. If I were the wind)	7:57
8.	"Co się stało kwiatom?" (eng. What happened to the flowers?)	6:16
9.	"Dzisiejszej nocy" (eng. Tonight)	4:09

== Personnel ==
- Tadeusz Nalepa - vocal, guitar
- Dariusz Kozakiewicz - guitar
- Tadeusz Trzciński - harmonica
- Jerzy Goleniewski - bass
- Józef Hajdasz - drums

== Release history ==
Year	Label	Format	Country	Out of Print?	Notes
1971	Polskie Nagrania "Muza"	LP	Poland	Yes	original LP release
1986	Polskie Nagrania "Muza"	LP	Poland	Yes	"Z archiwum polskiego Beatu" series; different cover
2000	Yesterday Records	CD	Poland	Yes	CD reissue; different cover
2005	Polskie Nagrania "Muza"	CD	Poland	No	CD reissue; original cover
2007	Polskie Nagrania "Muza"	LP	Poland	No	LP reissue
