= Zlodzieje zapalniczek – reedycja =

Zlodzieje zapalniczek - reedycja

Studio album by Pidzama Porno
- Released: 2007
- Recorded: Studio CZAD, Swarzedz
- Genre: Punk rock
- Length: 57:16
- Label: S.P. Records

Pidzama Porno chronology
Bulgarskie Centrum (2004)	Zlodzieje zapalniczek - reedycja (2007)	Finalista - DVD (2007)

Singles from Zlodzieje zapalniczek - reedycja
- 1. "Czekajac na trzesienie ziemi" Released: 2007

Professional ratings
Review scores
Source	Rating
Teraz Rock	2/5 stars

Zlodzieje zapalniczek - reedycja - the new version of Pidzama Porno's album, previously made in 1997. Recorded again and issued by SP Records, contains bonus tracks and videos. It is promoted with the single called “Czekając na trzęsienie ziemi”.

== Track listing ==
No.	Title	Length
1.	"Gnijąca modelka w taksówce"	2:43
2.	"Ezoteryczny Poznań"	4:21
3.	"28 (One Love)"	5:06
4.	"Stąpając po niepewnym gruncie"	5:12
5.	"Poznańskie dziewczęta"	3:59
6.	"Xero z kota"	2:59
7.	"Czas, czas, czas"	5:00
8.	"Czekając na trzęsienie ziemi"	3:56
9.	"Porządek panuje w Warszawie"	3:07
10.	"Bal u senatora '93"	3:46
11.	"Nasze nogi są jak z gumy"	4:54
12.	"Wojna nie jest twoim stanem naturalnym"	3:53
13.	"Film o końcu świata (demo '95)"	3:58
14.	"Nasze nogi są jak z gumy (demo '95)"	4:17

== Videos ==
- "Czekając na trzęsienie ziemi"

== Personnel ==
- Grabaż - vocal
- Kozak - guitar, vocal
- Dziadek - guitar
- Kuzyn - drums
- Julo - bass

Guests:

- Tom Horn - keyboard
- Lo - bass in "28 (one love)" (3)
- Jacek Kąkolewski - bass(13,14 - demo versions, band member at that time)
- Arkadiusz Kwiatkowski - trombone in "Ezoteryczny Poznań" (2)
- Krzysztof Krakuski - trumpet in "Ezoteryczny Poznań" (2)
- Wojciech Kamiński - sax in "Ezoteryczny Poznań" (2)
