= Racławówka =

- Village
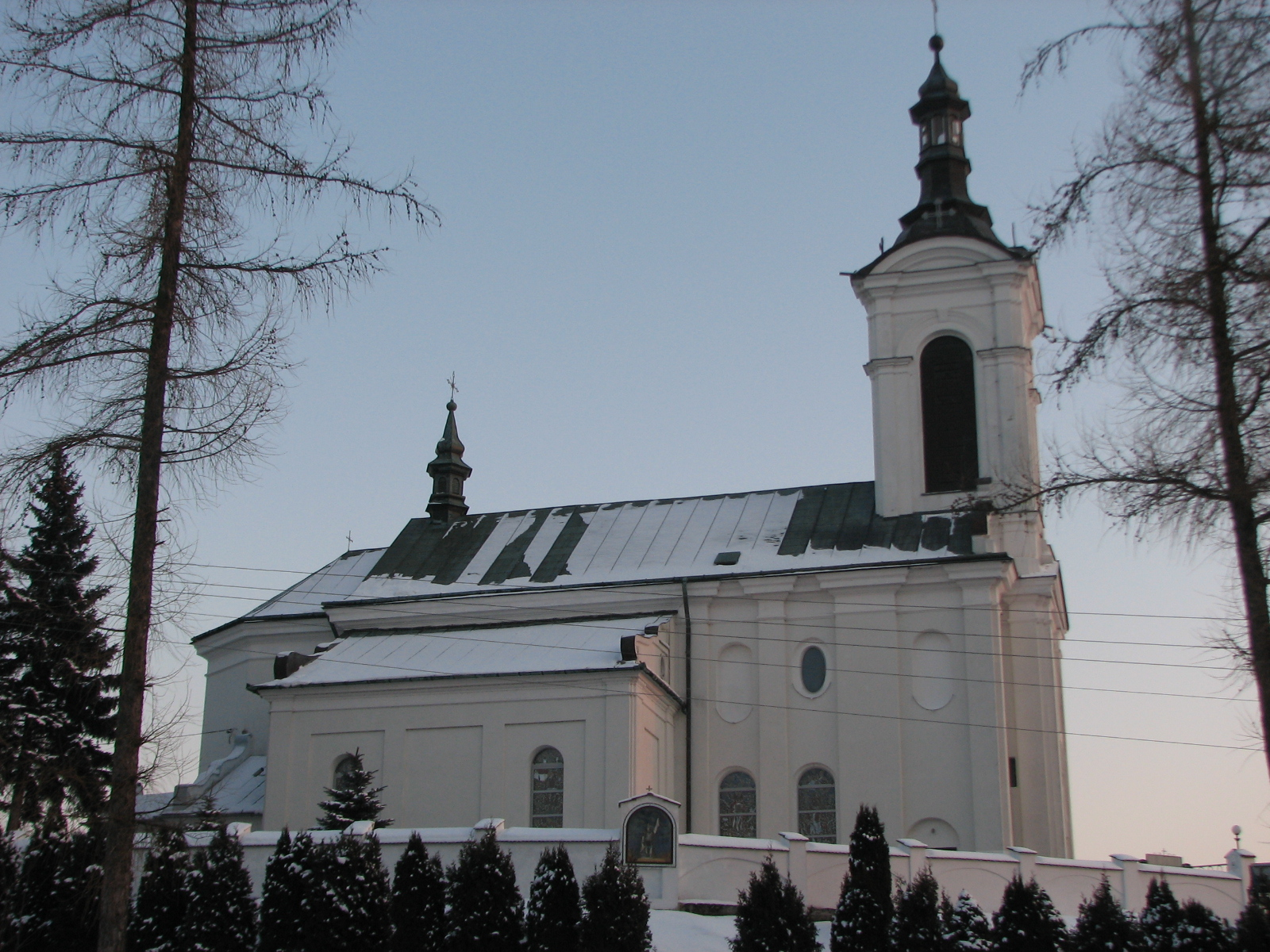
- Church of All Saints

- Location within Poland
- Coordinates: 50°1′N 21°55′E
- Country: Poland
- Voivodeship: Subcarpathian
- County: Rzeszów
- Gmina: Boguchwała

Racławówka [rat͡swaˈvufka] is a village in the administrative district of Gmina Boguchwała, within Rzeszów County, Subcarpathian Voivodeship, in south-eastern Poland.
