= Nosówka, Podkarpackie Voivodeship =

Nosówka
- Village
- Location within Poland
- Coordinates: 50°1′N 21°52′E
- Country: Poland
- Voivodeship: Subcarpathian
- County: Rzeszów
- Gmina: Boguchwała
- Population: 1,223
- Website: http://www.boguchwala.pl/solectwa/nosowka/

Nosówka [nɔˈsufka] is a village in the administrative district of Gmina Boguchwała, within Rzeszów County, Subcarpathian Voivodeship, in south-eastern Poland.
