= Mira Kubasińska =

Polish blues rock singer (1944–2005)

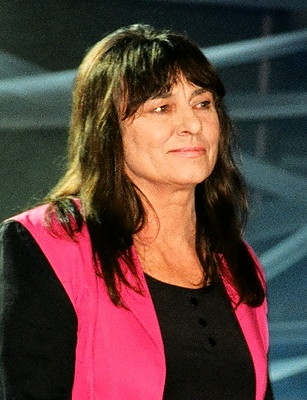

Background information
- Born: 8 September 1944; Bodzechów, Świętokrzyskie Voivodeship, Poland
- Died: 25 October 2005 (aged 61) Otwock, Masovian Voivodeship, Poland
- Genres: blues rock
- Occupation: singer
- Years active: 1962-2005
- Formerly of: Blackout, Breakout, and After Blues
- Spouse: Tadeusz Nalepa (m. 1964, div. 1980)

Mira Kubasińska (8 September 1944 – 25 October 2005) was a Polish blues rock singer during the big beat (an alternative term for rock and roll) period of the Polish music scene in the 1960s and 1970s. She was a member of the bands Blackout, Breakout, and After Blues.

== Early life ==
Kubasińska was born at Bodzechów, Świętokrzyskie Voivodeship, Poland in 1944. She grew up in Ostrowiec Świętokrzyski. Her grandfather played the violin and her father played the accordion.

During her childhood, Kubasińska won a competition run by the "Microphone for Everyone" radio show. She also practiced ballet in a folk ensemble at the Zakładowy Dom Kultury in Ostrowiec.

== Music career ==
Kubasińska moved to Rzeszów, Podkarpackie Voivodeship, in November 1962 to join the band of Roman Albrzykowski, a band leader for dance orchestras.

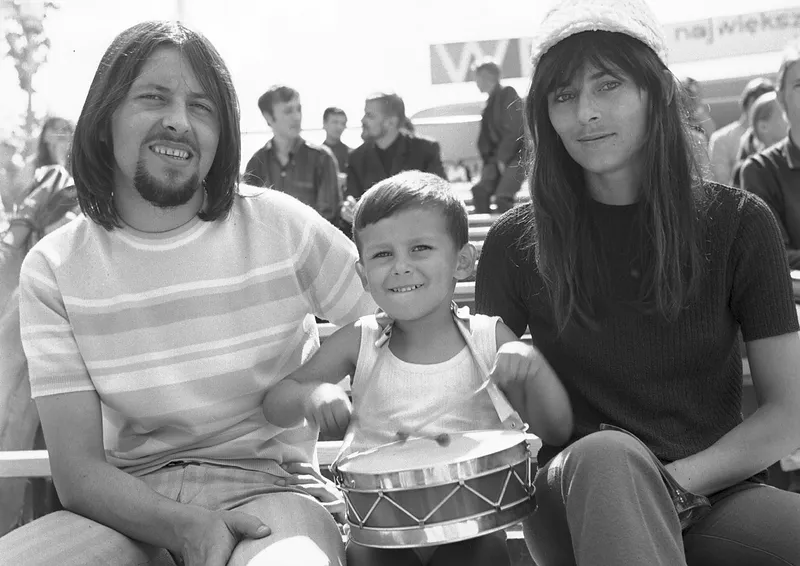
Kubasińska with her husband Tadeusz Nalepa and their son Piotr Nalepa in 1968

In 1963, Kubasińska sung a cover of "Let's Twist Again," originally by American rock and roll singer Chubby Checker, with blues guitar player Tadeusz Nalepa at the Young Talent Festival in Szczecin, Pomerania.

Kubasińska and Nalepa became close during rehearsals, exchanged addresses and wrote each other letters. They married at the Civil Registry Office in Wałbrzych on 8 January 1964. They had one son, Piotr Nalepa, who was born in 1965 and became a guitarist.

During the early 1960s, Kubasińska sometimes sung for the "edgy" blues rock band Blackout, with members including her husband and Stanisław Guzek (also known as Stan Borys). Blackout's biggest hit was the anti-war song "Wyspa."

In 1965 and 1966 Blackout toured with the British group London Beats in both Poland and England. Kubasińska was only permitted to travel abroad from Poland (then under the leadership of Władysław Gomułka of the Polish United Workers' Party) as she was a married woman and mother.

After Guzek left Blackout in February 1968, Kubasińska became the lead singer of the reformed and renamed band Breakout. Her husband was the guitarist, and the band were managed by Polish journalist and musician Franciszek Walicki.

Breakout's "western" image and Kubasińska's "psychedelic hippie" dance on stage during their performance at the Opole Festival in 1969 were considered controversial by some Polish journalists, but the band were successful and toured in Poland, the Netherlands and the Soviet Union. Kubasińska also released two solo albums in this period, Mira [[pl]] and Ogień. She was considered a role model for rebellious young women.

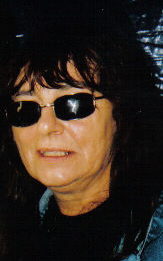
Kubasińska in later years

While travelling to play in the Netherlands in 1973, Kubasińska and other members of Breakout were involved in a serious car accident on the motorway near Arnhem. She was the most seriously injured and was hospitalised. After the accident, there was a gradual depreciation of Kubasińska's position in Breakout, and the band also became less popular in Poland. Kubasińska and Nalepa divorced in 1980, and Breakout disbanded in 1982.

Kubasińska then worked in several different jobs, such as paint production, painting The Smurfs toys, serving in a bar at a train station, and sewing suspenders. She remarried and had another son, called Konrad.

In 1994, Kubasińska returned to music in the duo After Blues.

Shortly before her death, Kubasińska was interviewed by Mariusz Szalbierz about her music career and how she was working on recording a new album. The album was finished by other musicians after she died and was released in 2009.

== Death and legacy ==
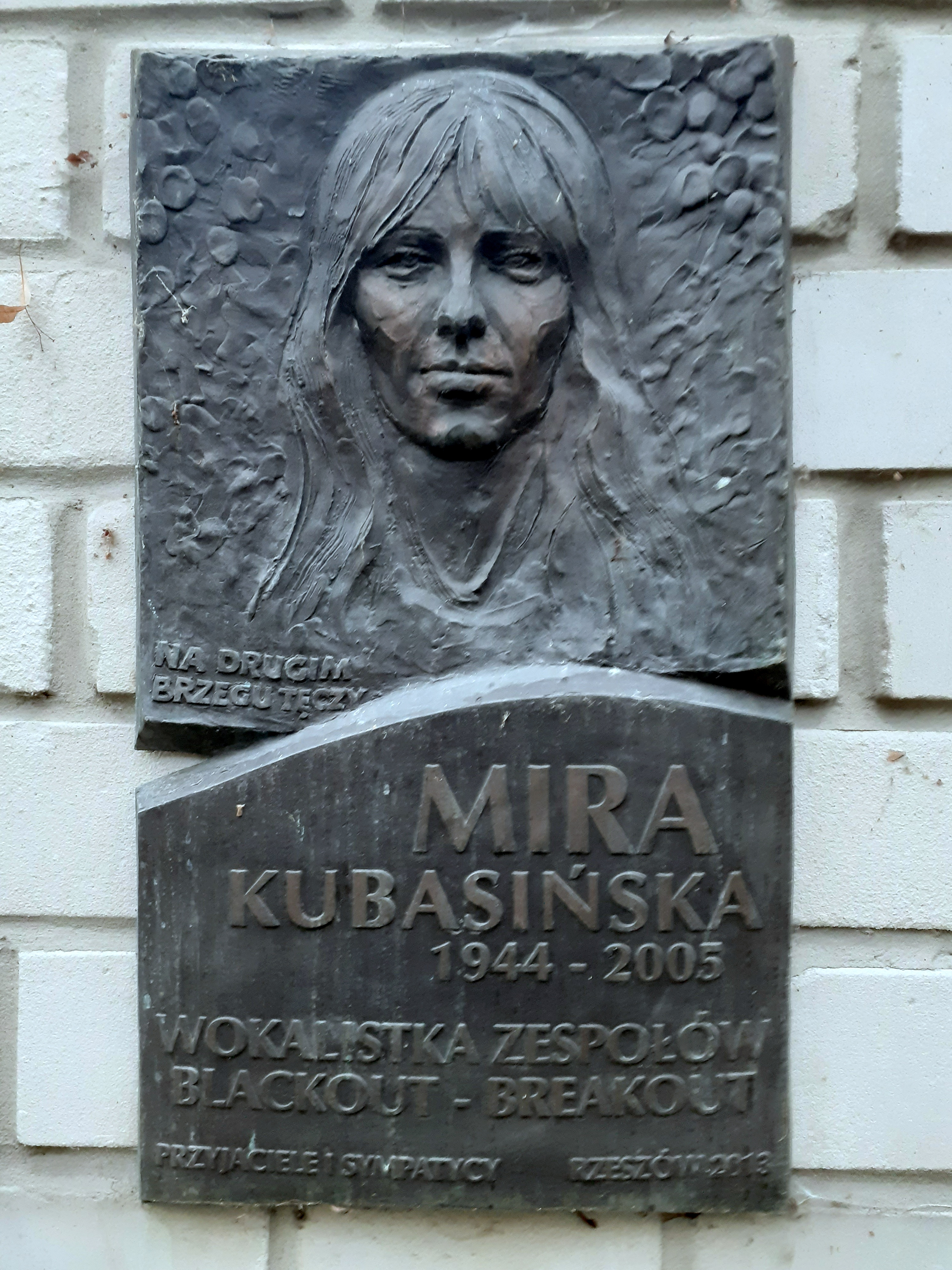
Memorial plaque to Kubasińska at the wall of Old Cemetery in Rzeszów, Podkarpackie, Poland

Kubasińska died at Otwock, Masovian Voivodeship, Poland, in 2005, after suffering a stroke while out shopping. She is buried at Otowick.

A memorial plaque has been erected in Kubasińska's memory at the Old Cemetery in Rzeszów, Podkarpackie Voivodeship, Poland.

Kubasińska has been referenced in a 2008 poem by cultural historian and writer Stanislav Lvovsky.
