= Zarzecze, Rzeszów County =

Zarzecze
- Village
- Location within Poland
- Coordinates: 49°57′11″N 21°55′20″E
- Country: Poland
- Voivodeship: Subcarpathian
- County: Rzeszów
- Gmina: Boguchwała

Zarzecze [zaˈʐɛt͡ʂɛ] is a village in the administrative district of Gmina Boguchwała, within Rzeszów County, Subcarpathian Voivodeship, in south-eastern Poland.
