= Niechobrz =

- Village
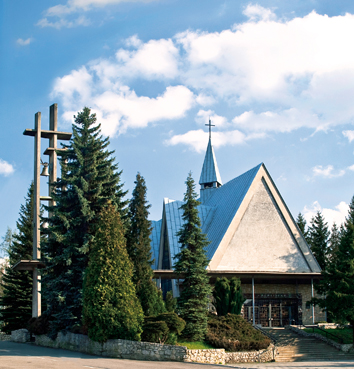
- Church of Our Lady of Perpetual Help

- Location within Poland
- Coordinates: 49°58′53″N 21°52′1″E
- Country: Poland
- Voivodeship: Subcarpathian
- County: Rzeszów
- Gmina: Boguchwała

Population (2017.01.01)
  - Total: 2,926

Niechobrz [ˈɲɛxɔpʂ] is a village in the administrative district of Gmina Boguchwała, within Rzeszów County, Subcarpathian Voivodeship, in south-eastern Poland.

Niechobrz was struck by an F4 tornado on 20 May 1960, killing 3 people and injuring 77.
