= Gmina Boguchwała =

Gmina Boguchwała Boguchwała Commune
- Gmina
- Flag Coat of arms
- Interactive map of Gmina Boguchwała
- Coordinates (Boguchwała): 50°0′N 21°56′E
- Country: Poland
- Voivodeship: Subcarpathian
- County: Rzeszów County
- Seat: Boguchwała

Area
  - Total: 88.93 km^{2} (34.34 sq mi)

Population (2006)
  - Total: 20,945
  - Density: 235.5/km^{2} (610.0/sq mi)
- Website: http://www.boguchwala.pl/

Gmina Boguchwała is an urban-rural gmina (administrative district) in Rzeszów County, Subcarpathian Voivodeship, in south-eastern Poland. Its seat is the town of Boguchwała, which lies approximately 7 kilometres (4 mi) south-west of the regional capital Rzeszów.

The gmina covers an area of 96.19 square kilometres (37.1 sq mi), and as of 2006 its total population is 20,945, of which the population of Boguchwała is 5,535.

== Villages ==
Apart from the town of Boguchwała, Gmina Boguchwała contains the villages and settlements of Kielanówka, Lutoryż, Mogielnica, Niechobrz, Nosówka, Racławówka, Wola Zgłobieńska, Zarzecze and Zgłobień.

== Neighbouring gminas ==
Gmina Boguchwała is bordered by the city of Rzeszów and by the gminas of Czudec, Iwierzyce, Lubenia, Świlcza and Tyczyn.
