= Wola Zgłobieńska =

- Village
- Location within Poland
- Coordinates: 50°0′N 21°49′E
- Country: Poland
- Voivodeship: Subcarpathian
- County: Rzeszów
- Gmina: Boguchwała

Wola Zgłobieńska [ˈvɔla zɡwɔˈbjɛɲska] is a village in the administrative district of Gmina Boguchwała, within Rzeszów County, Subcarpathian Voivodeship, in south-eastern Poland.
