= Mogielnica, Podkarpackie Voivodeship =

Mogielnica
- Village
- Location within Poland
- Coordinates: 49°58′44″N 21°53′25″E
- Country: Poland
- Voivodeship: Subcarpathian
- County: Rzeszów
- Gmina: Boguchwała

Mogielnica [mɔɡʲɛlˈnit͡sa] is a village in the administrative district of Gmina Boguchwała, within Rzeszów County, Subcarpathian Voivodeship, in south-eastern Poland.
