= Świetliki =

Polish band

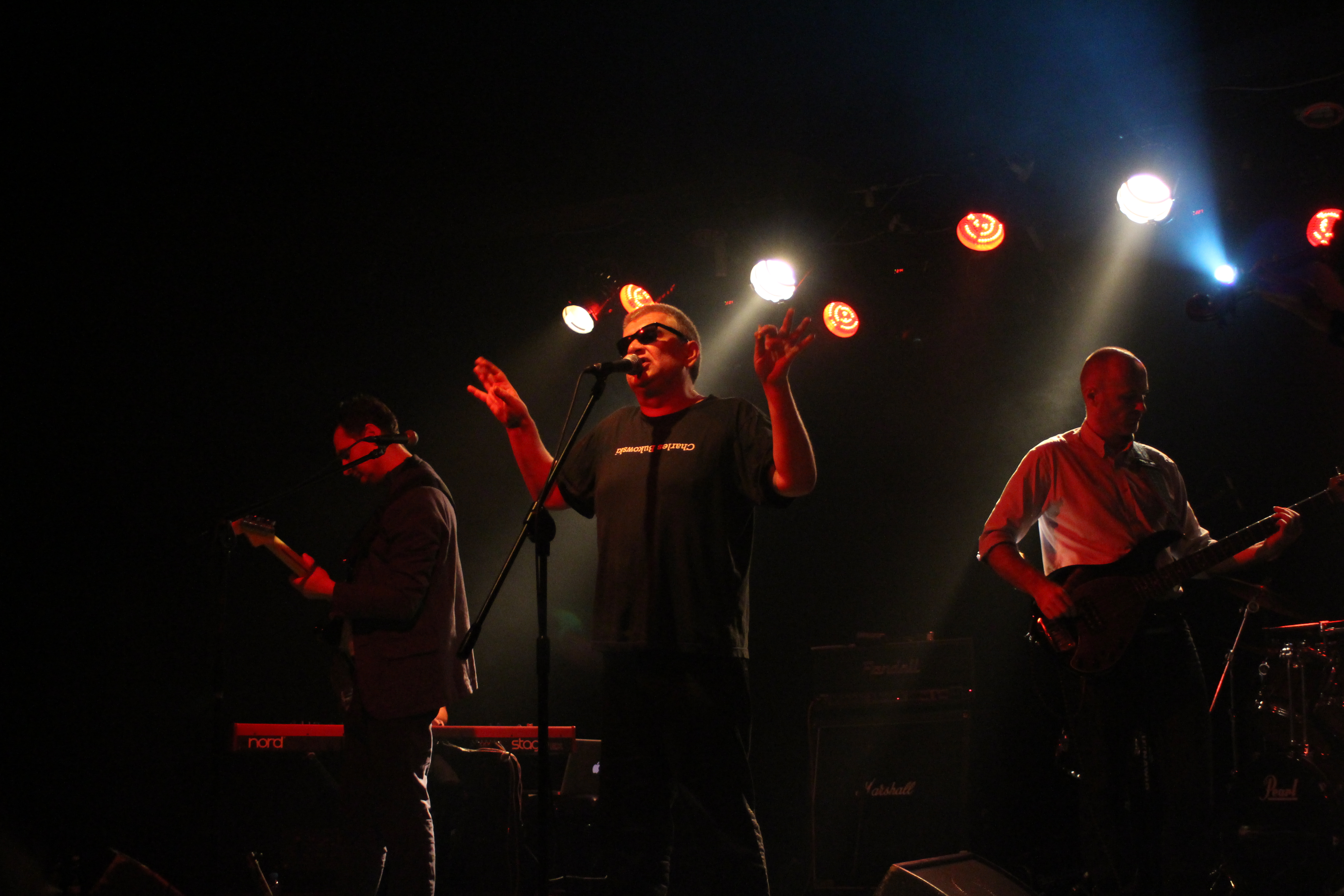
- Świetliki onstage in Cracow, 2013

Background information
- Origin: Kraków, Poland
- Genres: Alternative rock Sung poetry
- Years active: 1992—present
- Labels: Music Corner Records, Universal Music Poland, Karrot Kommando
- Members: Marcin Świetlicki; Grzegorz Dyduch; Marek Piotrowicz; Tomasz Radziszewski; Zuzanna Iwańska; Michał Wandzilak
- Website: Official Facebook Site

Świetliki (The Fireflies) are a Polish band formed in Kraków in October 1992. They perform music described as a mix of alternative rock and sung poetry.

Marcin Świetlicki is a lead vocalist and author of lyrics in most songs. Grzegorz Dyduch plays bass guitar. Since 2005, the group has often invited actor Bogusław Linda to participate in recordings and concerts as a guest vocalist.

Until 2020, the group released six studio albums and performed 191 concerts.

== Band members ==
Current members

- Marcin Świetlicki – vocals (1992–present)
- Grzegorz Dyduch – bass guitar, double bass, baritone guitar (1992–present)
- Marek Piotrowicz – drums (1992–present)
- Tomasz Radziszewski – electric guitar (1992–present)
- Zuzanna Iwańska – viola (2011–present)
- Michał Wandzilak – keyboards (2012–present)

== Discography ==
=== Studio albums ===
Title	Album details	Peak chart positions
Title	Album details	POL
Ogród koncentracyjny	Released: June 1, 1995; Label: Music Corner Records; Formats: CD	—
Cacy Cacy Fleischmaschine	Released: November 22, 1996; Label: Music Corner Records; Formats: CD	—
Perły przed wieprze	Released: October 11, 1999; Label: Music Corner Records; Formats: CD	—
Złe misie	Released: November 26, 2001; Label: Universal Music Poland; Formats: CD, digital download	—
Sromota	Released: October 12, 2013; Label: Karrot Kommando; Formats: CD, digital download	26
Wake Me Up Before You Fuck Me	Released: April 5, 2020; Label: Karrot Kommando; Formats: CD, digital download	—
"—" denotes a recording that did not chart or was not released in that territory.
