= Lutoryż =

- Village
- Location within Poland
- Coordinates: 49°58′N 21°55′E
- Country: Poland
- Voivodeship: Subcarpathian
- County: Rzeszów
- Gmina: Boguchwała
- Population: 1,564

Lutoryż [luˈtɔrɨʂ] is a village in the administrative district of Gmina Boguchwała, within Rzeszów County, Subcarpathian Voivodeship, in south-eastern Poland.
