= Breakout (band) =

Polish blues rock band

- Also known as: Blackout
- Origin: Rzeszów, Poland
- Genres: Blues rock, hard rock
- Years active: 1968–1982; 1986–1992; 1993–1999
- Labels: Polskie Nagrania Muza; Pronit, Yesterday; Andromeda, Digiton, Fraza Records, Intersonus, Pomaton EMI, Andante, Wilk Records
- Past members: Mira Kubasińska; Tadeusz Nalepa; Bogdan Lewandowski; Andrzej Tylec; Zbigniew Wypych

Breakout (originally known as Blackout) was a Polish blues rock band, formed on 1 February 1968.

== History ==
After a few years of playing as Blackout, the first performance of Breakout took place at the Musicorama festival in February 1968. In April the new bass player - Michał Muzolf, joined the group. In June the band toured in the countries of Benelux. After the band returned to Poland, they became one of the most famous Polish rock bands, owing much to a new sound-kit brought from western Europe, but also as they were arguably the first group to play blues rock in Poland.

In November 1968, Breakout performed several concerts across Poland. By January and February 1969, their song "Gdybyś kochał, hej!" had reached the top of the radio charts.

In 1969 they released their first album Na drugim brzegu tęczy, which they had recorded without K. Dłutowski, but with Włodzimierz Nahorny, who played the saxophone and flute. In August, Breakout took the new bass-player Piotr Nowak, but just at the beginning of 1970, he was replaced by Józef Skrzek. The same year Franciszek Walicki (manager) left the band.

In 1970, the band was more and more criticised by Polish mass media for pro-West lifestyle and long hair. As a result, the radio and TV stopped broadcasting their songs.

In 1971, Breakout accomplished arguably their best album: Blues. It was recorded by: Tadeusz Nalepa (vocal, lead guitar), Dariusz Kozakiewicz (guitar), Tadeusz Trzciński (harmonica), Jerzy Goleniewski (bass), Józef Hajdasz (drums).

Next year they recorded their fourth album Karate. After the recording was finished Jan Izbiński (vocal) joined for a short time. Karate turned out to be their best selling work to date. In 1973 year Włodzimierz Nahorny left Breakout, and the musicians helped to record the solo album of Mira Kubasińska Ogień.

Between 1973 and 1975 the band went on concerts to USSR, England and the Netherlands.

In 1974 Breakout recorded their fifth album Kamienie, which was recorded by: Tadeusz Nalepa (lead guitar, harmonica, vocal), Winicjusz Chróst (guitar), Zdzisław Zawadzki (bass), Wojciech Morawski (drums). On 21 November 1974, the band received the Golden Plate for Karate. Throughout 1975 there were many personal changes within the band, and at the beginning of the next year the personnel was established as: Mira Kubasińska (vocal), Tadeusz Nalepa (guitar), Zbigniew Wypych (bass), Bogdan Lewandowski (keyboards), Andrzej Tylec (drums). With these members Breakout recorded an album called NOL.

Fans had to wait till 1979 for the new album. Żagiel ziemi, recorded with Roman "Pazur" Wojciechowski, was a part of the Olympian Triptych prepared for the Olympics 1980 in Moscow, and simultaneously they recorded next album called ZOL.

The band ceased to exist in 1982 when the band leader Tadeusz Nalepa began the solo career. Up to the present day the band has been often reactivated for various events and concerts.

On 19 June 2007, in Rzeszów, the Breakout Festival was organized in memory of Mira Kubasińska and Tadeusz Nalepa.

== Band members ==
- Tadeusz Nalepa (1943–2007) – guitar, harmonica, vocal
- Mira Kubasińska (1944–2005) – vocal
- Janusz Zieliński – bass
- Krzysztof Dłutowski – keyboards
- Józef Hajdasz – drums

== Discography ==
=== Studio albums ===
- Blackout (1968)
- Na drugim brzegu tęczy (1969)
- 70a (1970)
- Blues (1971)
- Mira (1971)
- Karate (1972)
- Ogień (1973)
- Kamienie (1974)
- NOL (1976)
- ZOL (1979)
- Żagiel ziemi (1980)

=== Compilations ===
- Blackout (2) (1994)
- Breakout 1969/70 (1996)
- Ballady (1995)
