= Tadeusz Nalepa =

Polish musician

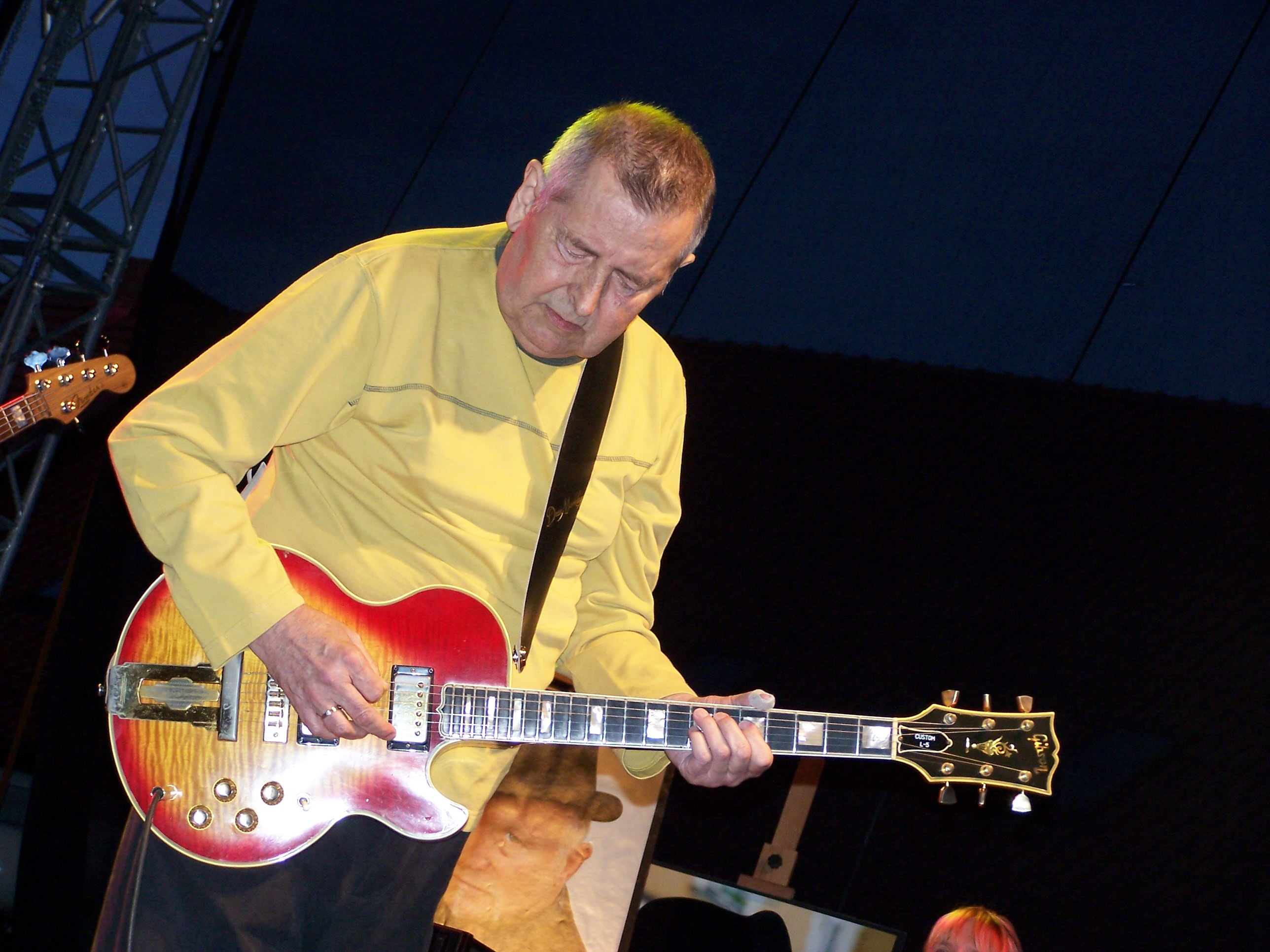
- Tadeusz Nalepa in 2006, with Gibson L-5

Background information
- Born: 26 August 1943; Zgłobień, Poland
- Died: 4 March 2007 (aged 63) Warsaw, Poland
- Genres: Rock; Blues
- Occupations: Singer-songwriter, composer
- Instruments: Vocals guitar harmonica
- Years active: 1963–2007

Tadeusz Nalepa (26 August 1943 in Zgłobień, Poland – 4 March 2007, Warsaw) was a Polish composer, guitar player, vocalist, and lyricist.

== Career ==
Nalepa graduated from the Music Academy in Rzeszów in the departments of violin, clarinet and contrabass. He received recognition in the category of duets at the 2nd annual "Festival of Young Talents" in Szczecin in 1963 along with Mira Kubasinska. They were married and had a son, named Piotr.

In 1965, Nalepa formed the band Blackout with Stan Borys and started composing music to the lyrics of a poet, Bogdan Loebl. The Blackout's first concert was on 3 September 1965 in a club Łącznościowiec in Rzeszów. Tadeusz Nalepa recorded a self-titled album with Blackout along with six smaller recordings. The group disbanded in 1967.

In 1968, Nalepa formed a group called Breakout which existed for 13 years before disbanding in 1982. Breakout had released 10 albums. In 1982, he debuted as a solo artist in the Gwardia Hall in Warsaw in concert "Rock-Blok". The same year he recorded an album for Izabela Trojanowska as well as formed his own band which consisted of (besides Nalepa): Ryszard Olesinski (guitar), Piotr Nowak (guitar), Bogdan Kowalewski (bass) and Marek Surzyn (drums).

On 25 May 1985, Nalepa re-formed Breakout because of the band's 20th anniversary.

In 1986, magazine Jazz Forum named him the best musician, composer and guitar player. Along with the other winners, he took part in the concert series "Blues/Rock Top '86" and at the same time, he also started co-operating with another Polish rock/blues band Dżem, (literally "Jam"). The two released a successful album Numero Uno.

After series of concerts abroad, Nalepa released a dual album, To mój blues ("My Blues"), which consisted recordings between 1982 and 1988.

In 1993, he performed with Nalepa-Breakout and the group released an album Jesteś w piekle ("You are in Hell") and in the same year he was awarded the Maria Jurkowska Award by the III Program of the Polish Radio.

The following albums, as Tadeusz Nalepa, were released with different band members. His last release was a DVD 60 urodziny ("60th birthday") (the only one in his catalogue), released in 2006 which contained a show from 22 November 2003. It was reissued later on as a DVD+Cd.

In 2003, Nalepa was awarded the Knight's Cross of the Polonia Restituta.

Nalepa became very ill in the recent years and he had to be dialised because of the kidney problem. He died on 4 March 2007 due to serious illness of his digestive system.

== Discography ==
With Breakout

- Na drugim brzegu tęczy (1969)
- 70a (1970)
- Blues (1971)
- Mira (1971)
- Karate (1972)
- Ogień (1973)
- Kamienie (1974)
- NOL (1976)
- ZOL (1979)
- Żagiel Ziemi (1980)

As Tadeusz Nalepa

- Tadeusz Nalepa (1985)
- Tadeusz Nalepa promotion After Blues (1985)
- Live 1986 (1986)
- Sen szaleńca (1987)
- Numero Uno (with Dżem) (1987)
- To mój blues vol. I + II (1991)
- Absolutnie (1991)
- Jesteś w piekle (1993)
- Pożegnalny cyrk (1994)
- Najstarszy zawód świata (1995)
- Flamenco i blues (1996)
- Zerwany film (1999)
- Dbaj o miłość (compilation) (2001)
- Sumienie (2002)
- 60 urodziny (2006)
- 1982–2002 (box of 13 CDs) (2006)
