= Zgłobień =

- Village
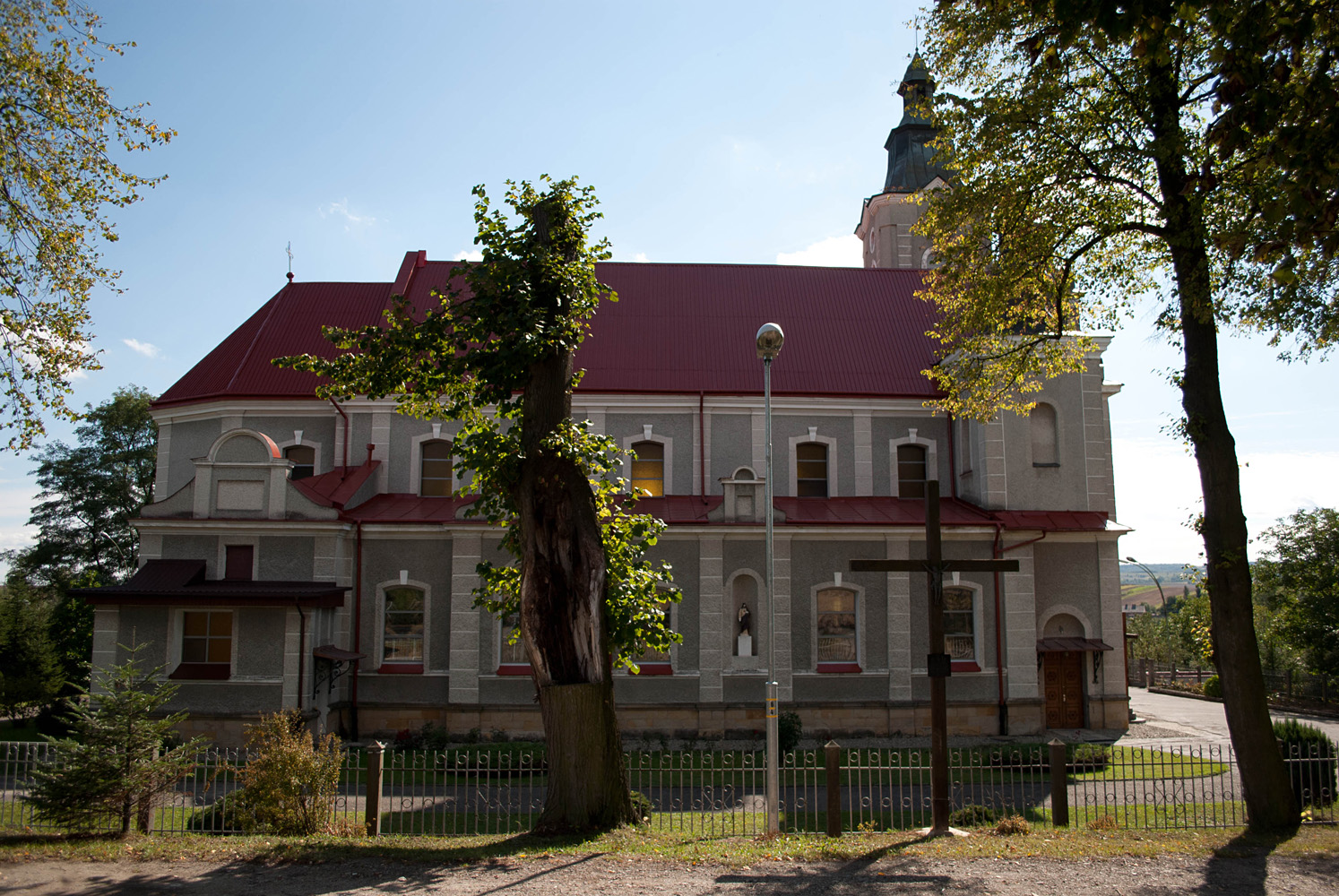
- Church of Saint Andrew the Apostle

- Location within Poland
- Coordinates: 50°0′33″N 21°50′14″E
- Country: Poland
- Voivodeship: Subcarpathian
- County: Rzeszów
- Gmina: Boguchwała

Population
  - Total: 1,542

Zgłobień [ˈzɡwɔbjɛɲ] is a village in the administrative district of Gmina Boguchwała, within Rzeszów County, Subcarpathian Voivodeship, in south-eastern Poland.

From before 1438 to 1611 Zgłobień was the centre of an estate in Sandomierz Voivodeship adjoining its boundary with Ruthenian Voivodeship and the old medieval border established between 1000 and 1300 by the emergent Polish and Ruthenian states. The fortified manor house in Zgłobień, converted into a granary in the nineteenth century and currently serving (after the restoration of 2010–21) as the archaeology depot of the Rzeszów Regional Museum, preserves the original layout of the interior together with brick cellar vaults, four masonry portals and two of the windows in situ. With its ground floor portals dated to the second half of the sixteenth century on stylistic grounds, it would have been built for Spytek Wawrzyniec Jordan (d. 1568), castellan of Kraków from 1565, and his wife Anna Sieniawska (d. 1597), the daughter of Mikołaj who was the Grand Crown Hetman in 1561–9. Their youngest daughter, Zofia, was married to Samuel Zborowski, the protagonist of a major political affair of the reigns of Henry of Valois and Stephen Báthory, executed at the order of chancellor Jan Zamoyski in 1584; another daughter, Magdalena, was the sister-in-law of Andrzej Wapowski, the man killed by Zborowski at Henry's coronation in 1574 in an act that triggered the downfall of the Zborowski family. On Anna Sieniawska's death in 1597, her eldest daughter Elżbieta agreed to compensate her sisters with 8000 złoty for the advantage in productive capacity that the Zgłobień estate allotted to her enjoyed over the Melsztyn estate.

== Literature ==
- "Central Statistical Office (GUS) – TERYT (National Register of Territorial Land Apportionment Journal)" (in Polish). 1 June 2008.
- Anusik, Zbigniew (2022), "Podział dawnego latyfundium kasztelana krakowskiego Spytka Wawrzyńca Jordana (1518–1568) w 1597 roku. Studium z dziejów młodszej gałęzi rodziny Jordanów herbu Trąby", Przegląd Nauk Historycznych, 21 (2): 9–70
- Bober, Monika; Ligoda, Joanna (2021), "XVI-wieczny dwór obronny w Zgłobniu i jego nowa funkcja – Regionalna Składnica Zabytków Archeologicznych jako nowy oddział Muzeum Okręgowego w Rzeszowie", Materiały i Sprawozdania Rzeszowskiego Ośrodka Archeologicznego, 42: 201–214, ISSN 0137-5725
- Cempla, Marek; Ćwiek, Janusz; Cechosz, Stanisław; Holcer, Łukasz (2012). "Dwór-spichlerz w Zgłobniu. Projekt rekonstrukcji kamieniarki" (PDF). Kraków.
- Parczewski, Michał (1991), Początki kształtowania się polsko-ruskiej rubieży etnicznej w Karpatach. U źródeł rozpadu Słowiańszczyzny na odłam wschodni i zachodni, Kraków: Instytut Archeologii UJ, ISBN 83-85531-00-9
- Pietruski, Oktaw; Liske, Ksawery (1888), Akta grodzkie i ziemskie z czasów Rzeczypospolitej Polskiej z Archiwum tak zwanego bernardyńskiego we Lwowie, vol. 13, Lwów: Seyfarth i Czajkowski
