= Klaus Mitffoch =

- Origin: Wrocław, Poland
- Genres: Post-punk, new wave
- Years active: 1979–1984, 1986–1989
- Label: Tonpress
- Members: Lech Janerka; Krzysztof Pociecha; Wiesław Mrozik; Marek Puchała
- Past members: Kazimierz Sycz

Klaus Mitffoch was a Polish rock group founded in 1979 in Wrocław by Lech Janerka, Krzysztof Pociecha and Kazimierz Sycz. Soon joined by Wiesław Mrozik and Marek Puchała (who replaced Sycz on drums), the band gained a large underground following. They recorded their first single Ogniowe Strzelby/Śmielej in 1983 and their debut album Klaus Mitffoch in 1984. It received several awards and is considered one of the most important albums in the history of Polish rock music.

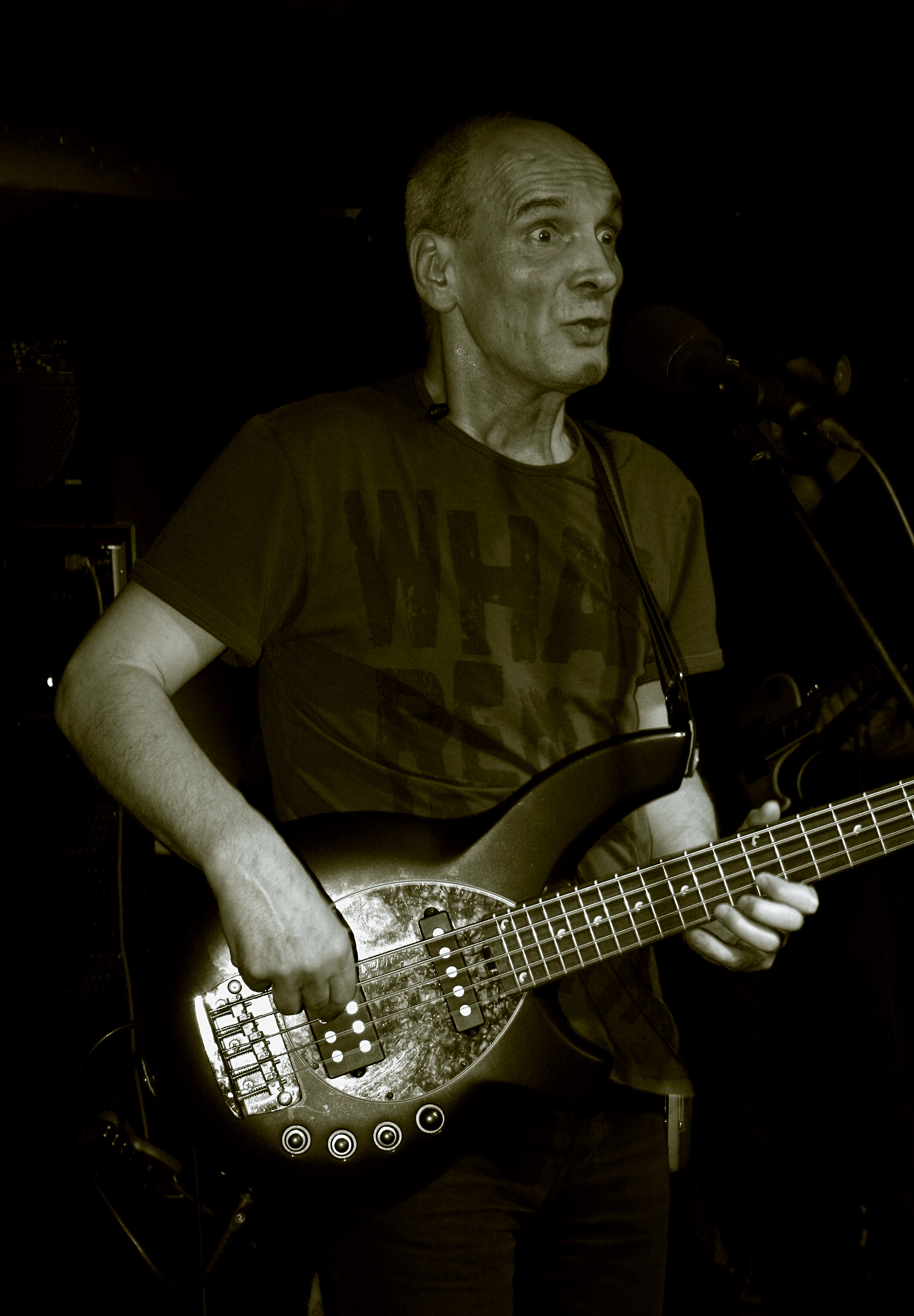
Lech Janerka performing at the Zero Club, Częstochowa in 2011

The band disintegrated in 1984. Janerka went on to a long-term solo career; Pociecha collaborated with Janerka on two more albums. From 1986 to 1989 Mrozik and Puchała, joined by Paweł Chyliński (guitar/vocals), Jacek Fedorowicz (bass guitar) and Zbigniew Kapturski (guitar/vocals), continued to perform under the name 'Klaus Mit Foch'; this latter line-up released the album Mordoplan in 1988.

== Band members ==
- Lech Janerka (bass guitar/vocals)
- Krzysztof Pociecha (guitar/backing vocals)
- Wiesław Mrozik (guitar/backing vocals)
- Marek Puchała (drums/backing vocals)

== Discography ==
=== Studio albums ===
- Klaus Mitffoch (1984)
- Mordoplan (1988, as Klaus Mit Foch)

=== Singles ===
- Ogniowe Strzelby / Smielej (1983)
- Jezu jak się cieszę / O głowie (1983)
- Siedzi / Tutaj wesoło (1984)
