= Muniek Staszczyk =

Polish singer

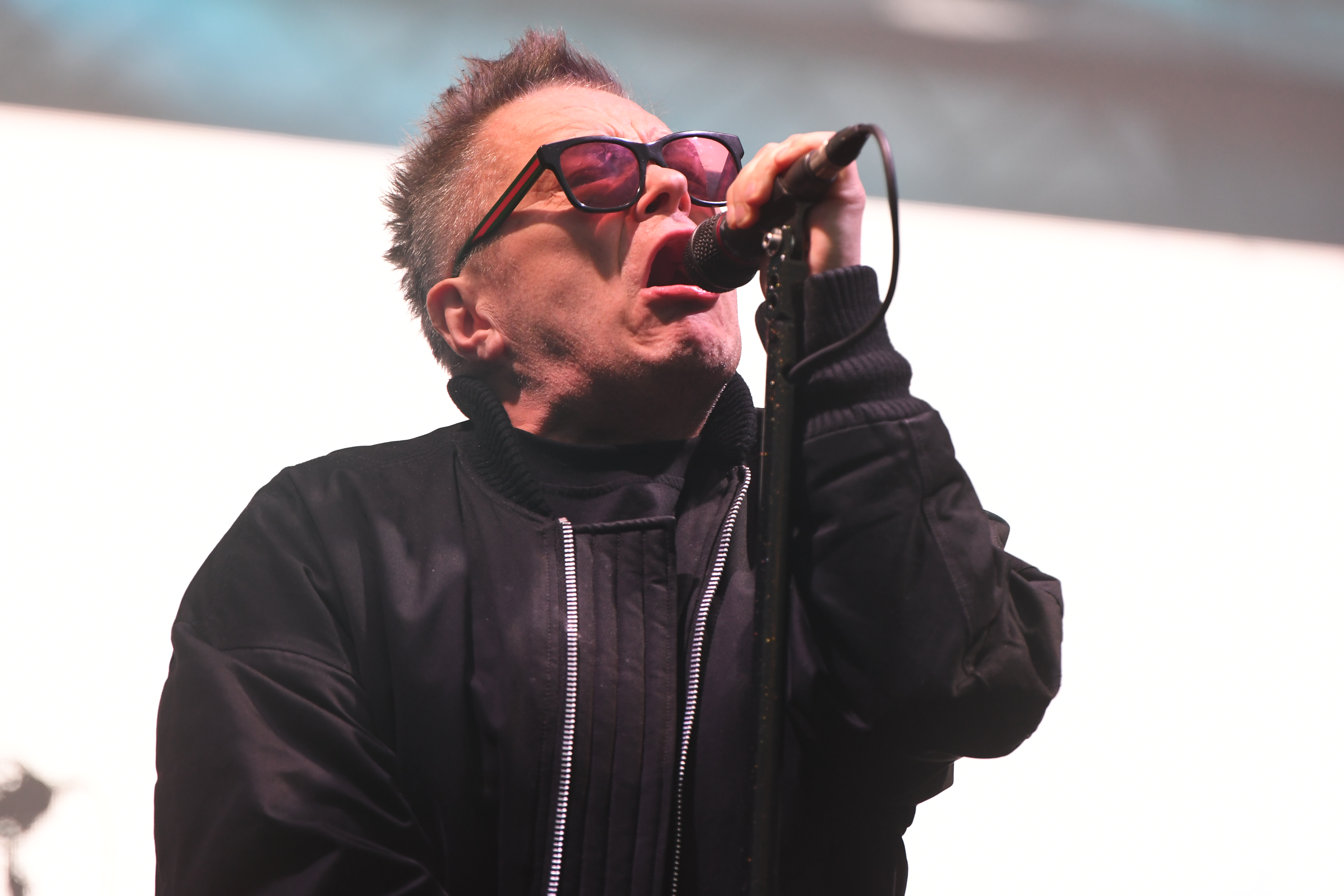
- Staszczyk during a T.Love concert in Wrocław, 2023
- Born: Zygmunt Marek Staszczyk; 5 November 1963 (age 62); Częstochowa, Poland
- Education: University of Warsaw
- Occupations: Musician, singer
- Spouse: Marta Staszczyk
- Children: 2 (1 daughter, 1 son)
- Musical career
- Also known as: Muniek
- Genres: Rock
- Instrument: Bass guitar
- Years active: 1982 – present
- Labels: Sony Music Entertainment Poland, Agora SA, Warner Music Poland
- Member of: T.Love

Zygmunt Marek "Muniek" Staszczyk (born 5 November 1963 in Częstochowa) is a Polish vocalist, founder, bandleader, and initially also bassist of T.Love. He was also one of two producers of I Hate Rock'n'Roll, the 2006 T.Love album. He cooperated with many Polish artists and bands such as Maanam, Kasia Nosowska, Krzysztof Krawczyk, Pidzama Porno, and Habakuk.

== Biography ==
He was born in Częstochowa, in Raków workers district.

Finished the general education secondary school in Czestochowa (IV L.O. - he had written a song about this school)

Before he set up T.Love he was playing in Atak (the name was later changed to Opozycja). In later times he was singing in Paul Pavique Movement, Szwagierkolaska ane Rege Inna Polish Stylee.

Muniek Staszczyk is married to Marta and has a son Jan (born 1990) and a daughter Maria (ur. 1993).

== Discography ==
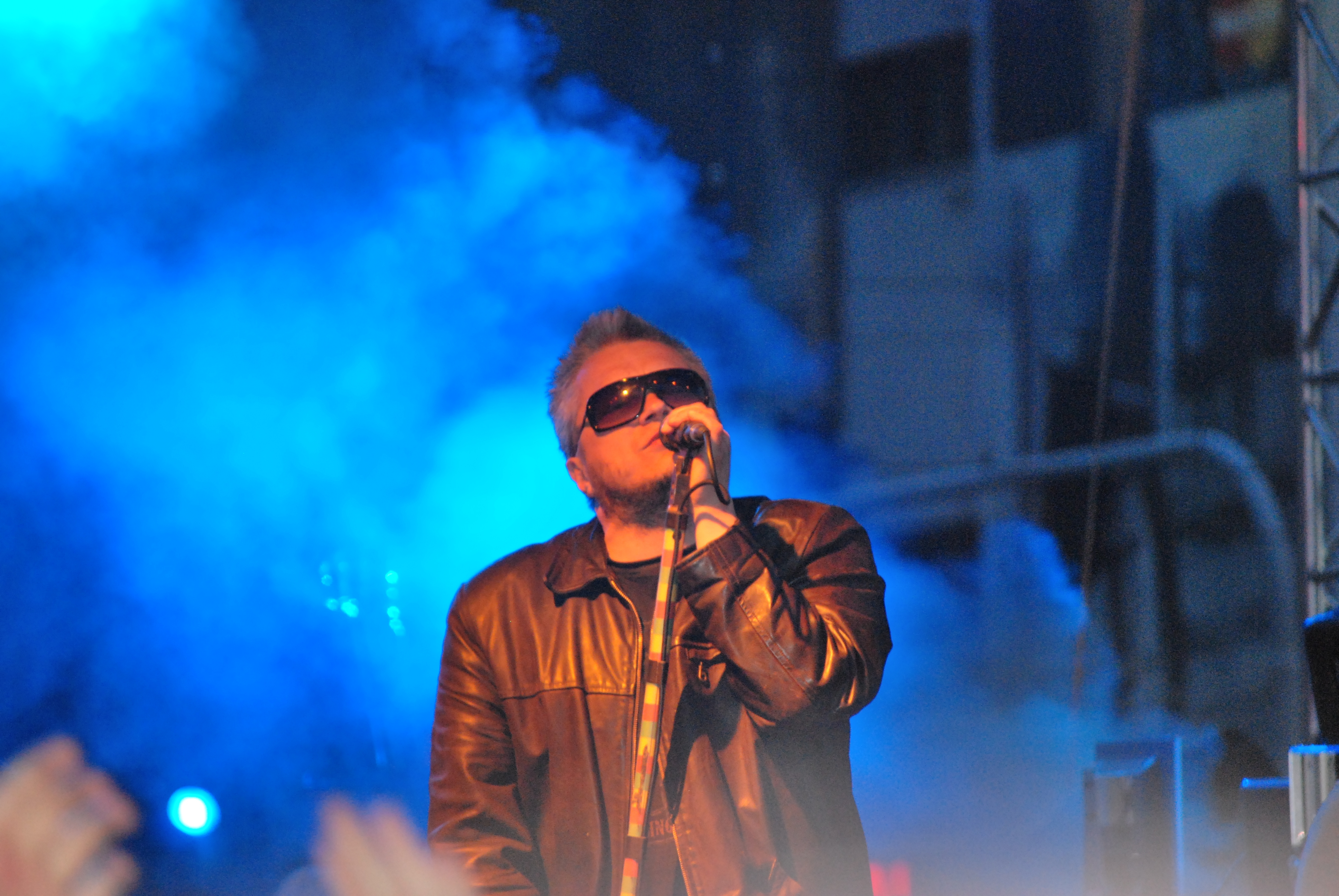
Staszczyk with T.Love, singing in Święto Łodzi 2011

=== Studio albums ===
Title	Album details	Peak chart positions	Certifications
Title	Album details	POL	Certifications
Muniek	Released: 15 March 2010; Label: Sony Music Entertainment Poland; Formats: CD	3	POL: Gold
"—" denotes a recording that did not chart or was not released in that territory.

=== Live albums ===
Title	Album details
Muniek. Najmniejszy koncert świata	Released: 5 September 2010; Label: Agora SA; Formats: digital download

=== Singles ===
Title	Year	Peak chart positions	Album
Title	Year	POL	Album
"Święty"	2010	4	Muniek
"Dzieje grzechu" (featuring Anna Maria Jopek)	2010	—	Muniek
"Nobody's Perfect"	2014	—	Muniek (re-release)
"—" denotes a recording that did not chart or was not released in that territory.

=== Video albums ===
Title	Video details
Muniek. Najmniejszy koncert świata	Released: 7 October 2010; Label: Agora SA; Formats: DVD

=== Music videos ===
Title	Year	Directed	Album
"Dzieje grzechu" (featuring Anna Maria Jopek)	2010	Mateusz Pleskacz, Jacek Nastał	Muniek
"Święty"	2010	Xawery Żuławski, Maria Strzelecka	Muniek
