= Lech Janerka =

Polish musician (born 1953)

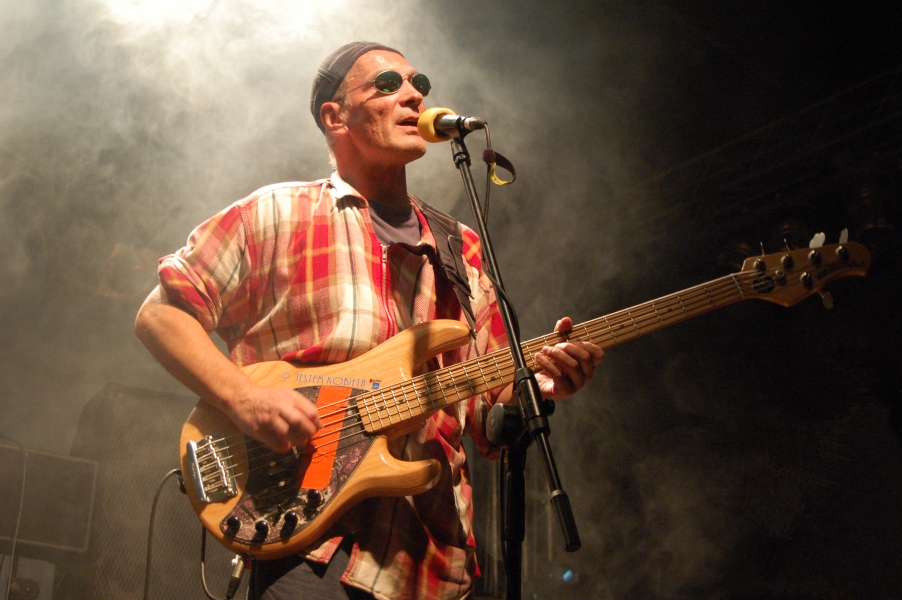
- Janerka performing on 27 August 2005
- Born: 2 May 1953 (age 73); Wrocław, Poland
- Occupations: Musician, singer
- Musical career
- Genres: Post-punk, new wave
- Instruments: Vocals, bass
- Labels: MJM Music PL, Polskie Nagrania Muza, Agencja Artystyczna MTJ, BMG Poland, Agora SA
- Website: Official Webpage

Lech Andrzej Janerka (born 2 May 1953 in Wrocław, Poland) is a Polish songwriter, vocalist, and bassist. In the 1980s he was leader of a notable Polish post-punk/new wave band called Klaus Mitffoch, based in Wrocław.

== Discography ==
=== Studio albums ===
Title	Album details	Peak chart positions
Title	Album details	POL
Historia podwodna	Released: 1986; Label: Tonpress; Formats: LP, CD, CS, digital download	—
Piosenki	Released: 1989; Label: Polskie Nagrania Muza; Formats: LP, CD, CS, digital download	—
Ur	Released: 1991; Label: Intermal; Formats: CD, CS	—
Bruhaha	Released: 1994; Label: MJM Music; Formats: CD, CS, digital download	—
Dobranoc	Released: 1997; Label: KOCH International; Formats: CD	—
Fiu fiu…	Released: 11 February 2002; Label: BMG; Formats: CD	4
Plagiaty	Released: 28 February 2005; Label: BMG; Formats: CD	5
Gipsowy odlew falsyfikatu	Released: 17 November 2023; Label: Mystic; Formats: CD	2
"—" denotes a recording that did not chart or was not released in that territory.

=== Compilation albums ===
Title	Album details
Co lepsze kawałki	Released: 11 October 1993; Label: Sonic; Formats: CD, CS
The Best – Strzeż się tych miejsc	Released: 4 July 2005; Label: Agencja Artystyczna MTJ; Formats: CD, digital download
Gwiazdy polskiej muzyki lat 80.	Released: 9 October 2007; Label: TMM Polska / Planeta Marketing; Formats: CD

=== Live albums ===
Title	Album details
Bez prądu	Released: 10 May 1994; Label: Polskie Radio Łódź, Image; Formats: CD
Najmniejszy koncert świata	Released: 11 October 2010; Label: Agora SA; Formats: Digital download

=== Video albums ===
Title	Video details
Najmniejszy koncert świata	Released: 11 October 2010; Label: Agora SA; Formats: DVD
