= T.Love =

Polish rock band

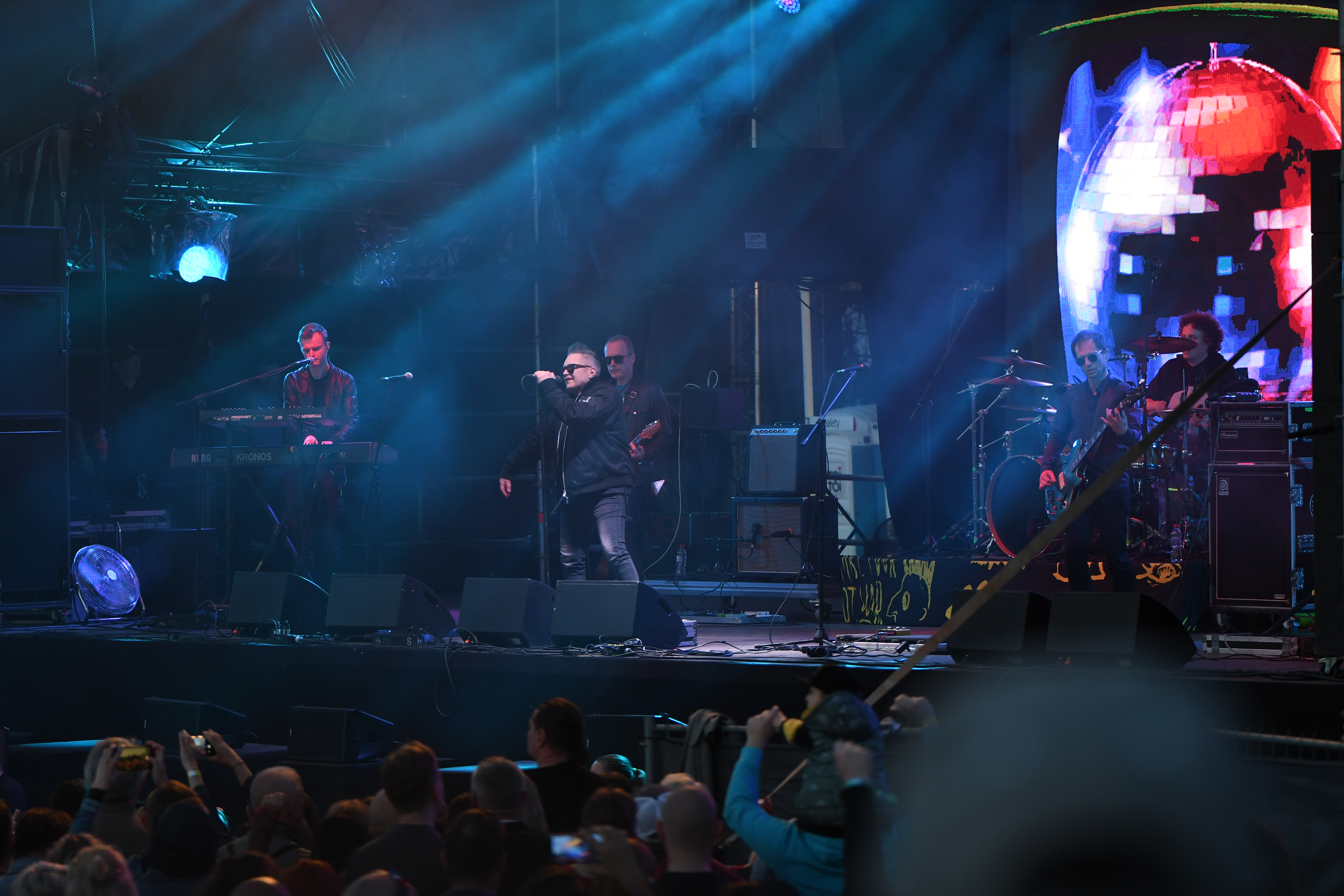
- T.Love in concert in 2023

Background information
- Origin: Częstochowa, Poland
- Genres: Rock
- Years active: 1982–present
- Labels: EMI Music Poland
- Members: Muniek Staszczyk; Sidney Polak; Paweł Nazimek; Maciej Majchrzak; Michał Marecki; Jan Pęczak
- Website: http://www.t-love.pl/ (in Polish & English)

T.Love is a Polish rock band formed in 1982, originally known as Teenage Love Alternative, by Zygmunt "Muniek" Staszczyk, Janusz Konorowski, Dariusz Zając and Jacek Wudecki, all friends from high school in Częstochowa.

The band changed their name to T.Love in December 1987.

== Members ==
=== Current line-up ===
- Zygmunt Staszczyk – vocals (1982–present), bass guitar (1982–1983)
- Maciej Majchrzak – guitars (1994–present)
- Jan Pęczak – guitars (2007–present)
- Paweł Nazimek – bass guitar (1991–present)
- Sidney Polak – drums (1990–present)
- Michał Marecki – keyboards (2005–present)

=== Former members ===
- Janusz Knorowski – guitars (1982–1985)
- Wojciech Wierus – guitars (1983–1984)
- Andrzej Zeńczewski – guitars (1984–1989)
- Rafał Włoczewski – guitars (1986–1989)
- Jarosław Kowalski – guitars (1986)
- Jan Benedek – guitars (1990–1994)
- Krzysztof Szymański – guitars (1990–1991)
- Krzysztof Zawadka – guitars (1991–1992)
- Jacek "Perkoz" Perkowski – guitars (1992–2006)
- Jacek Śliwczyński – bass guitar (1983–1989)
- Przemysław Wójcicki – bass guitar (1990)
- Tomasz "Wolfgang" Grochowalski – bass guitar (1991)
- Jacek Wudecki – drums (1982–1987)
- Piotr Wysocki – drums (1987–1989)
- Robert Szambelan – drums (1989–1990)
- Darek Zając – keyboards (1982–1989)
- Romuald Kunikowski – keyboards (1991–1994)
- Jarosław Woszczyna – saxophone (1982–1983)
- Henryk Wosążnik – saxophone (1983)
- Piotr Malak – saxophone (1984–1985)
- Tom Pierzchalski – saxophone (1985–1989)

== Discography ==
=== Studio albums ===
Title	Album details	Peak chart positions	Sales	Certifications
Title	Album details	POL	Sales	Certifications
Wychowanie	Released: 1989; Label: Polskie Nagrania; Formats: LP	—		
Pocisk miłości	Released: August 12, 1991; Label: Arston; Formats: LP, CD, CS	—		
King	Released: April 6, 1992; Label: Baron Records; Formats: LP, CD, CS, digital download	—		
Prymityw	Released: November 21, 1994; Label: Pomaton EMI; Formats: CD, CS	—	POL: 100,000+	POL: Gold
Al Capone	Released: May 13, 1996; Label: Pomaton EMI; Formats: LP, CD, CS	—	POL: 100,000+	POL: Gold
Chłopaki nie płaczą	Released: September 15, 1997; Label: Pomaton EMI; Formats: LP, CD, CS	—	POL: 50,000+	POL: Gold
Antyidol	Released: June 14, 1999; Label: Pomaton EMI; Formats: CD, CS	—		
Model 01	Released: November 5, 2001; Label: Pomaton EMI; Formats: LP, CD, CS, digital download	2	POL: 50,000+	POL: Gold
I Hate Rock'n'Roll	Released: March 27, 2006; Label: EMI Music Poland; Formats: CD, digital download	2	POL: 15,000+	POL: Gold
Old is Gold	Released: October 16, 2012; Label: EMI Music Poland; Formats: LP, CD, CD+DVD, digital download	5	POL: 15,000+	POL: Gold
T.Love	Released: November 4, 2016; Label: Pomaton EMI, Warner Music; Formats: LP, CD, digital download	5		
"—" denotes a recording that did not chart or was not released in that territory.

=== Live albums ===
Title	Album details	Peak chart positions	Sales	Certifications
Title	Album details	POL	Sales	Certifications
I Love You	Released: April 18, 1994; Label: Pomaton EMI; Formats: CD, CS	—	POL: 100,000+	POL: Gold
T.Live	Released: November 13, 2003; Label: Pomaton EMI; Formats: CD	16		
"—" denotes a recording that did not chart or was not released in that territory.

=== Video albums ===
Title	Video details	Sales	Certifications
T.Love – Przystanek Woodstock 2004	Released: December 4, 2004; Label: Złoty Melon; Formats: DVD		
Najmniejszy koncert świata	Released: December 17, 2010; Label: Agora SA; Formats: DVD	POL: 5,000+	POL: Gold
