= Pidżama Porno =

Polish band

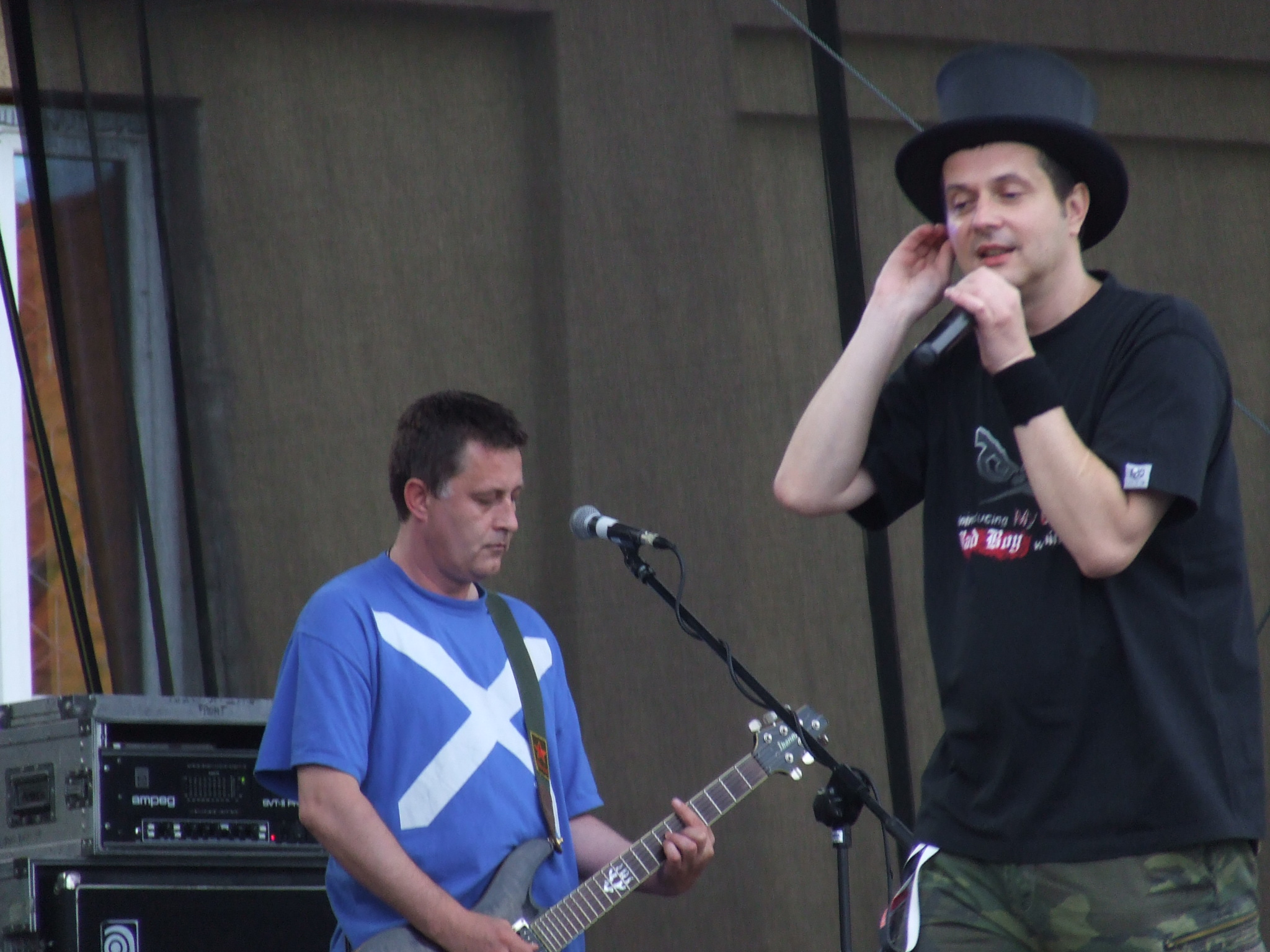

Background information
- Origin: Poznań, Pila, Poland
- Genres: Punk rock, Alternative rock
- Years active: 1987–1990; 1995–2007; 2015–present
- Label: S.P. Records
- Members: Grabaż, Kozak, Dziadek, Julo, Kuzyn
- Past members: Ropuch, Filary, Jacek Kąkolewski
- Website: pidzamaporno.pl

Pidżama Porno (Porno Pyjamas) is a Polish punk rock / reggae / ska band.

== History ==
The band was founded in December 1987 in Poznań, by Krzysztof "Grabaż" Grabowski and Andrzej "Kozak" Kozakiewicz, students of Adam Mickiewicz University, who originally come from the town of Piła. Two years later they recorded their first material, named Ulice jak stygmaty (Streets Like Stigmata). The band played at the Jarocin Festival and in 1990 went on a tour to Czechoslovakia as the first underground group from Poland.

In 1990 Pidżama Porno recorded their second album Futurista. Although, it was released in 1996, the demo was copied on MC's and shared through the fans. To this day it remains very popular among Polish listeners. Soon afterward the group disbanded, to return in 1995. Their first material recorded after the break, Zamiast burzy (Instead of Storm) was very popular and made the band famous. Pidżama Porno started playing numerous concerts across Poland as well as Europe. Their songs were played frequently by various radio stations and subsequent albums confirmed the band's popularity. Also, Grabowski's intelligent lyrics greatly helped establish the group's position.

In 1996 Pidżama Porno signed a contract with S.P. Records, publisher of Kult (band) and Kazik. Their first achievement was Złodzieje zapalniczek (Thieves of Lighters) published in 1997. In 1998 Pidżama Porno released their next album called Styropian. This album included a song called "Antifa", which has become an anti-racist anthem amongst Polish youth.

Pidżama Porno re-released Ulice jak stygmaty, titled Ulice jak stygmaty - absolutne rarytasy in 1999. In the meantime they had more time to polish their new material, which was published in 2001. The name of their new album was Marchef w butonierce. Many young fans know this band only from the song "Twoja Generacja" ("Your Generation") released as the first single from this album. This is why Grabaż didn't like to play this song. The following two albums Koncertówka part 1 and Koncertówka 2. Drugi szczyt were bootlegs from Pidżama Porno's birthday concerts. In the meantime Grabaz formed a group called Strachy na Lachy. As the time went on, as Strachy na Lachy became popular in the media. Their last studio album was Bulgarskie Centrum (Bulgariam Centre) released in August 2004. In the opinion of fans this was Pidżama Porno's worst album, very similar to Grabaz's newer projects. At that time the band started to consider breaking up, which was announced on 13 July 2007. The band bid goodbye to their fans on their 20th birthday tour and by releasing a concert DVD titled Finalista. Their very last concert song was "Droga na Brześć" ("Road to Brest") from the "Bulgarian Centre", ending with "...Droga na Brześć, 666, trzymaj się, cześć!" ("...Road to Brest, 666, fare well, bye!").

The band reunited for the 30th anniversary of the Jarocin Festival and played one more concert on 17 July 2010.

The band consists of:

- Krzysztof "Grabaż" Grabowski – vocals
- Andrzej "Kozak" Kozakiewicz – guitar
- Slawek "Dziadek" Mizerkiewicz – guitar
- Julian "Julo" Piotrowiak – bass guitar
- Rafal "Kuzyn" Piotrowiak – drums

== Discography ==
=== Studio albums ===
Year	Title	Label
1989	Ulice jak stygmaty	Lewy Front
1990	Futurista	Mami
1994	Zamiast burzy	Mami
1997	Złodzieje zapalniczek	S.P. Records
1998	Styropian	S.P. Records
1999	Ulice jak stygmaty - absolutne rarytasy	S.P. Records
2001	Marchef w butonierce	S.P. Records
2004	Bulgarskie Centrum	S.P. Records
2007	Zlodzieje zapalniczek - reedycja	S.P. Records
2009	Styropian - reedycja	S.P. Records
2019	Sprzedawca jutra	S.P. Records
