= Marcin Świetlicki =

Polish poet, writer, and musician (born 1961)

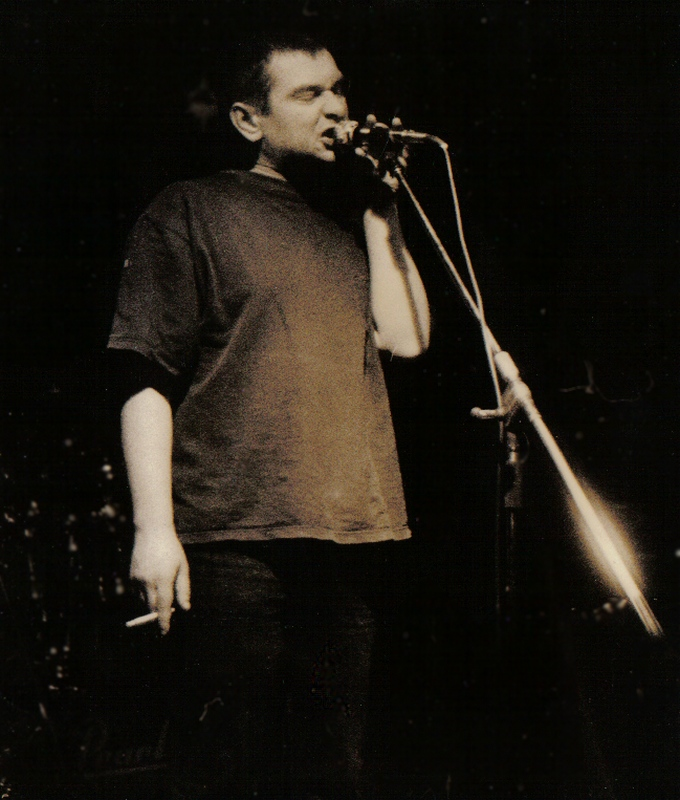
- Świetlicki performing at a concert in Nowa Sól, 1997

Background information
- Born: Marcin Adam Świetlicki; December 24, 1961 (age 64); Piaski, Lublin Voivodeship, Polish People's Republic
- Years active: 1992–present
- Member of: Świetliki

Marcin Świetlicki (born 24 December 1961) is a Polish poet, writer, and musician. He lives and works in Kraków, Poland.

Świetlicki was born in Piaski, near Lublin, Poland. He studied Polish Literature at the Jagiellonian University in Kraków, where he has been living since 1980. He worked as an editor at the Tygodnik Powszechny weekly from 1991 until 2004. Besides his publications and readings as a poet, he also performs as an actor and heads the band Świetliki. Świetlicki has won various prizes and awards for his poetry, including the 1996 Kościelski Award and November 2006 Kraków Book of the Month Award.
