= Julian Piotrowiak =

- Also known as: Julo
- Born: April 29, 1970 (age 55)
- Origin: Poznań, Poland
- Genres: Rock
- Occupation: Musician
- Instrument: Bass guitar
- Years active: 1989–present
- Labels: S.P. Records, MAMI

Julian "Julo" Piotrowiak (born April 29, 1970), former bass guitarist of Pidżama Porno, where he played with his cousin, Rafal Piotrowiak. He now works as a bass guitar teacher in Poznań.
