= Krzysztof Grabowski =

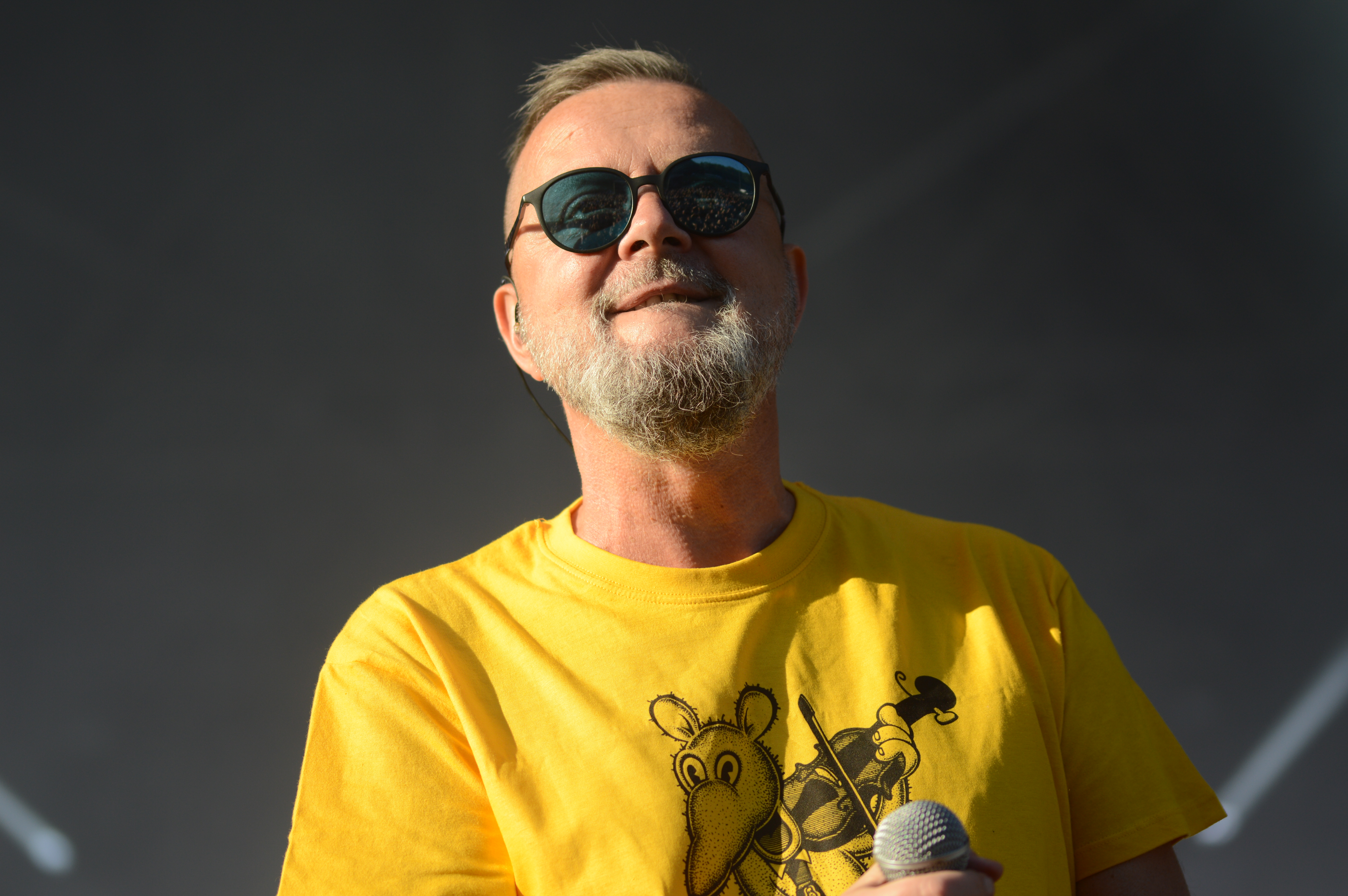
- Krzysztof Grabowski in 2023
- Born: March 13, 1965 (age 61); Poznań, Poland
- Education: Adam Mickiewicz University in Poznań
- Occupations: Musician, singer-songwriter, radio personality
- Years active: 1984–present
- Musical career
- Also known as: Grabaż
- Genres: Rock, Alternative
- Instruments: Vocals, guitar
- Labels: S.P. Records, MAMI

Krzysztof „Grabaż" Grabowski (born March 13, 1965) is a Polish poet, singer, author of lyrics and music for songs by bands Pidżama Porno, Strachy na Lachy, Ręce Do Góry and Lavina Cox.

His lyrics are functioning also as poetry – they were released for the first time in 1994 in "Welwetowe Swetry". The book contained 46 song lyrics from the bands Ręce do Góry, Pidżama Porno, and Lavina Cox and was released by Wydawnictwo Lampa i Iskra Boża (ISBN 83-901125-4-X). In 1997 there was a reedition of that book (ISBN 83-86735-21-X), containing 63 song lyrics (most of them with guitar chords). In 2008 Lampa released "Wiersze"(ISBN 978-83-89603-58-6), a book with all the lyrics written by Grabowski.

== Biography ==
He attended 1st Maria Curie-Skłodowska General Education Secondary School (I Liceum Ogólnokształcące im. Marii Curie-Skłodowskiej) in Piła.

After that he studied history at Adam Mickiewicz University in Poznań.

His scene debut was in 1984 in a band called Ręce do Góry.

In 1987 he established Pidżama Porno. At present Grabowski sings in Strachy na Lachy and works in a radio station Roxy FM, where he leads an evening transmission.

== Awards ==
- January 8, 2008 Paszport Polityki in popular music
- March 27, 2008 prize from the Speaker of the Wielkopolska Region for artistic achievements
- November 29, 2008 Gigant (Giant) of Gazeta Wyborcza.
