= Strachy na Lachy =

Polish rock band

Strachy Na Lachy
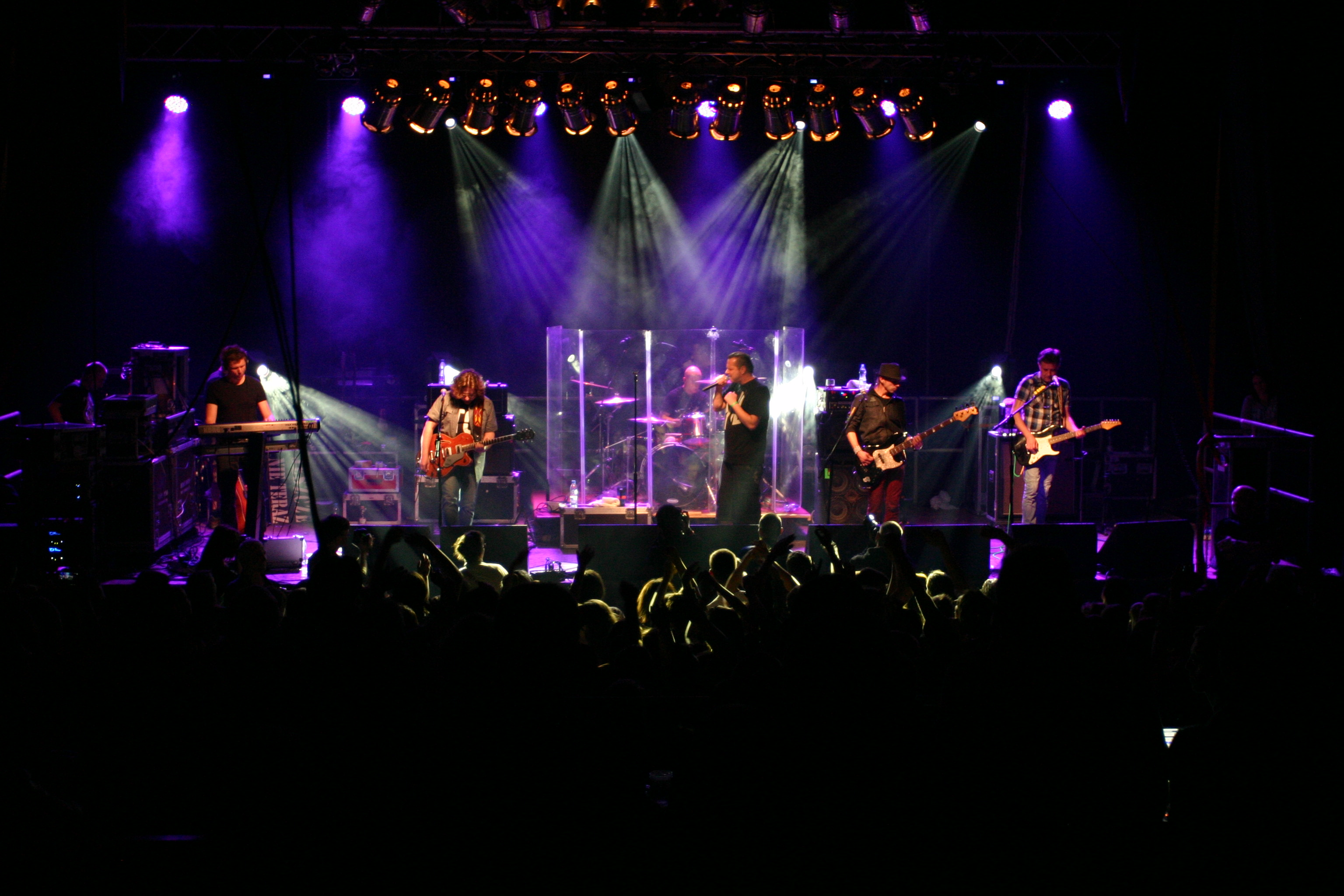

Background information
- Origin: Piła, Poland
- Genre: Alternative rock
- Years active: 2003–present
- Label: S.P. Records
- Members: Grabaż, Kozak, Longin Lo, Kuzyn, Maniek, Pan Areczek
- Website: http://www.strachynalachy.art.pl/

Strachy Na Lachy (properly Międzymiastówka Muzykująca Strachy Na Lachy) is a Polish rock band (originally known as Grabaż + Ktoś Tam Jeszcze before becoming Grabaż i Strachy Na Lachy).

Strachy Na Lachy (Empty Threats) is led by Krzysztof "Grabaż" Grabowski and Andrzej "Kozak" Kozakiewicz, who also play in the punk group Pidżama Porno. They formed Strachy Na Lachy in order to play softer music, such as rock ballads. Their first album, Strachy Na Lachy, was released in December 2003, and a second, Piła Tango, the title track of which became their first hit, was released at the end of 2005.

They often play in the Piwnica 21 Club in Poznań.

The artwork for the Piła Tango album is by the Armenian artist Vahan Bego. In 2007 Strachy na Lachy recorded a tribute album to Jacek Kaczmarski, and a year later they released their tribute to the underground Polish communist music culture, the album Zakazane Piosenki (Forbidden songs).

== Members ==
- Krzysztof "Grabaż" Grabowski - vocals and guitar
- Andrzej "Kozak" Kozakiewicz - guitar and vocals
- Rafał "Kuzyn" Piotrkowiak - drums
- Longin "Lo" Bartkowiak - bass and vocals
- Mariusz "Maniek" Nalepa - almost everything
- Tomasz "Tom Horn" Rożek - keyboards

== Discography ==
=== Studio albums ===
| Title | Album details | Peak chart positions | Sales | Certifications |
| Title | Album details | POL | Sales | Certifications |
|---|---|---|---|---|
| Strachy na Lachy | Released: December 8, 2003; Label: S.P. Records; Formats: CD, digital download | — | | |
| Piła tango | Released: November 7, 2005; Label: S.P. Records; Formats: CD, digital download | 4 | POL: 15,000+ | POL: Gold |
| Dodekafonia | Released: February 22, 2010; Label: S.P. Records; Formats: CD, digital download | 1 | POL: 30,000+ | POL: Platinum |
| !TO! | Released: February 9, 2013; Label: S.P. Records; Formats: CD, digital download | 1 | POL: 15,000+ | POL: Gold |
| Przechodzień o wschodzie | Released: 29 September 2017; Label: S.P. Records; Formats: CD, digital download | 5 | | |
| Piekło | Released: 1 October 2021; Label: S.P. Records; Formats: CD, digital download | | | |
"—" denotes a recording that did not chart or was not released in that territory.

=== Compilation albums ===
| Title | Album details | Peak chart positions | Sales | Certifications |
| Title | Album details | POL | Sales | Certifications |
|---|---|---|---|---|
| Dekada | Released: October 27, 2011; Label: S.P. Records; Formats: CD | 10 | POL: 15,000+ | POL: Gold |
"—" denotes a recording that did not chart or was not released in that territory.

=== Cover albums ===
| Title | Album details | Peak chart positions | Sales | Certifications |
| Title | Album details | POL | Sales | Certifications |
|---|---|---|---|---|
| Autor | Released: October 22, 2007; Label: S.P. Records; Formats: CD, digital download | 3 | POL: 15,000+ | POL: Gold |
| Zakazane piosenki | Released: September 22, 2008; Label: S.P. Records; Formats: CD, digital download | 4 | POL: 15,000+ | POL: Gold |
"—" denotes a recording that did not chart or was not released in that territory.

=== Video albums ===
| Title | Video details | Sales | Certifications |
|---|---|---|---|
| Przejście | Released: October 1, 2012; Label: S.P. Records; Formats: DVD | POL: 5,000+ | POL: Gold |
