= List of Polish musicians and musical groups =

This is a list of Polish musicians and musical groups.

== Female vocalists ==
- Aga Zaryan
- Alicja Boratyn
- Alicja Janosz
- Ania Dąbrowska
- Ania Wiśniewska (Ania Świątczak)
- Anita Lipnicka
- Anna German
- Anna Jantar
- Anna Maria Jopek
- Basia
- Doda
- Cleo
- Edyta Bartosiewicz
- Edyta Geppert
- Edyta Górniak
- Elzbieta Dmoch
- Ewa Farna
- Ewa Sonnet
- Ewelina Flinta
- Ewelina Lisowska
- Gaba Kulka
- Gosia Andrzejewicz
- Irena Santor
- Joanna Liszowska
- Julia Marcell
- Justyna Majkowska
- Justyna Steczkowska
- Kayah
- Kari Amirian
- Kasia Cerekwicka
- Kasia Nosowska
- Kasia Kowalska
- Kasia Stankiewicz
- Magda Femme
- Magda Umer
- Majka Jeżowska
- Maria Peszek
- Mandaryna
- Marika
- Marta Mirska
- Maryla Rodowicz
- Mela Koteluk
- Mika Urbaniak
- Monika Borzym
- Monika Brodka
- Natalia Kukulska
- Natalia Przybysz (alias N'Talia, Natu)
- Natasza Urbańska
- Novika
- Patricia Kazadi
- Patrycja Markowska
- Reni Jusis
- Renata Przemyk
- Sanah
- Shazza
- Slawa Przybylska
- Tatiana Okupnik
- Violetta Villas

== Male vocalists ==
- Andrzej "Piasek" Piaseczny
- Artur Andrus
- Artur Gadowski
- Artur Rojek
- Czesław Niemen
- Czesław Śpiewa
- Dawid Podsiadło
- Gienek Loska
- Grzegorz Turnau
- Kamil Bednarek
- Kazik Staszewski
- Krzysztof Krawczyk
- Krzysztof Zalewski
- Leszek Malinowski
- Maciej Maleńczuk
- Waldemar Sierański
- Maciej Silski
- Marcin Rozynek
- Michał Szpak
- Michał Wiśniewski
- Mieczysław Fogg
- Muniek Staszczyk
- Pablopavo
- Piotr Lisiecki
- Piotr Rogucki
- Robert Gawliński
- Seweryn Krajewski
- Stan Borys
- Stanisław Sojka
- Tadeusz Nalepa
- Tomasz Makowiecki
- Wojciech Waglewski

== Classical ==
- Sebastian Niedziela (born 1975), composer, guitarist
- Frédéric Chopin
- Klaudia Maria Kudelko
- Karol Kurpiński
- Stefania Łukowicz-Mokwa
- Henryk Wieniawski

== Jazz ==
- Aga Zaryan
- Andrzej Kurylewicz
- Anna Maria Jopek
- Czesław Niemen
- Kazimierz Jonkisz
- Krzysztof Komeda
- Leszek Możdżer
- Marcin Wasilewski
- Marek Napiórkowski
- Michał Urbaniak
- Monika Borzym
- Motion Trio
- Tomasz Stańko
- Urszula Dudziak
- Wojciech Karolak
- Zbigniew Namysłowski
- Ludwik Konopko

== Hip-hop/rap ==
- AbradAb
- Emade
- Kaliber 44
- L.U.C
- Liroy
- Magik
- Małolat
- O.S.T.R.
- Onar
- Paktofonika
- Peja
- Pezet
- Płomień 81
- Popek
- Sokół
- Tede

== Pop/R&B/Soul/Alternative ==
- Blue Café
- The Dumplings
- June
- Őszibarack
- Sistars
- Smolik

== Reggae ==
- AbradAb
- Bednarek
- Izrael
- Marika
- Mesajah
- Pablopavo
- Star Guard Muffin
- Vavamuffin

== Rock ==
- Akurat
- Armia
- Big Cyc
- BRAThANKI (folk-rock)
- Breakout (blues-rock)
- Bruno Schulz
- Brygada Kryzys
- Budka Suflera
- Coma
- Cool Kids of Death
- Czerwone Gitary
- Czerwono-Czarni
- Czesław Niemen
- De Press
- Dezerter (punk-rock)
- Dżem
- Exodus
- Happysad
- Hey
- Homo Twist
- Hurt
- IRA
- Kazik Na Żywo (KNŻ)
- Kim Nowak
- KSU
- Kult
- L.Stadt
- Lady Pank
- Lombard
- Łąki Łan
- Lux Perpetua
- Luxtorpeda
- Maanam
- Muchy
- Myslovitz
- Niebiesko-Czarni
- O.N.A.
- Perfect
- Püdelsi
- Pustki
- Republika
- Riverside
- Rhythm and Blues
- SBB
- Siekiera
- Skaldowie
- Strachy na Lachy
- Sztywny Pal Azji
- T.Love
- The Car Is on Fire
- Tilt
- TSA
- Virgin
- Voo Voo
- Wilki
- Ya Hozna

== Sung poetry ==
- Agnieszka Osiecka
- Emanuel Szlechter
- Ewa Demarczyk
- Grzegorz Turnau
- Jacek Kaczmarski
- Jan Krzysztof Kelus
- Jeremi Przybora
- Jerzy Ficowski
- Jonasz Kofta
- Konstanty Ildefons Gałczyński
- Ludwik Starski
- Maciej Zembaty
- Magda Umer
- Marek Grechuta
- Michał Żebrowski
- Stare Dobre Małżeństwo
- Świetliki (Marcin Świetlicki)
- Wojciech Młynarski

== Black metal/death metal/heavy metal ==
- Acid Drinkers
- Batushka
- Behemoth
- Decapitated
- Fanthrash
- Frontside
- Graveland
- Lost Soul
- Lux Occulta
- Thy Disease
- Trauma
- TSA
- Turbo
- Vader
- Vesania

== Power metal ==
- Lux Perpetua

== Punk ==
- Abaddon
- Alians
- Apatia
- Armia
- Brygada Kryzys
- Dezerter
- Farben Lehre
- Kryzys
- Moskwa
- Post Regiment
- Sedes
- Siekiera
- Śmierć Kliniczna
- TZN Xenna
- Włochaty

== Folk ==
- Brathanki
- Golec uOrkiestra
- Halina Mlynkova
- Janusz Frychel
- Tulia
- Trebunie Tutki
- Warsaw Village Band
- Zakopower

== Synth pop/electronic/EBM/disco polo/gothic ==
- Artrosis
- Bogdan Raczynski
- Closterkeller
- Cold Therapy
- Jacaszek
- Imperium
- Kombii
- Moonlight
- Shazza
- Skalpel (nu jazz)

== Opera ==
- Irene Abendroth (1871–1932)
- Piotr Beczała (1966–)
- Grażyna Brodzińska (1951–)
- Anna Cymmerman
- Wojtek Drabowicz (1966–2007)
- Ján Koehler (–1895)
- Adolf Kozieradski (1835–1901)
- Mariusz Kwiecień (1972–)
- Bernard Ładysz (1922–2020)
- Aleksander Myszuga (1853–1922)
- Jozef Michal Poniatowski (1814–1873)
- Alfred Orda (1915–2004)
- Jadwiga Rappé (1952–2025)
- Józefina Reszke (1855–1891)
- Paulina Rivoli (1823–1881)
- Arnold Rutkowski
- Ada Sari (1886–1968)
- Sophie Stebnowska (1753–1848)
- Stefania Toczyska (1943–)
- Agnieszka Truskolaska (1755–1831)
- Ganna Walska (1887–1984)
- Stanisława Zawadzka (1890–1988)
