= Wianki =

Festival in Poland

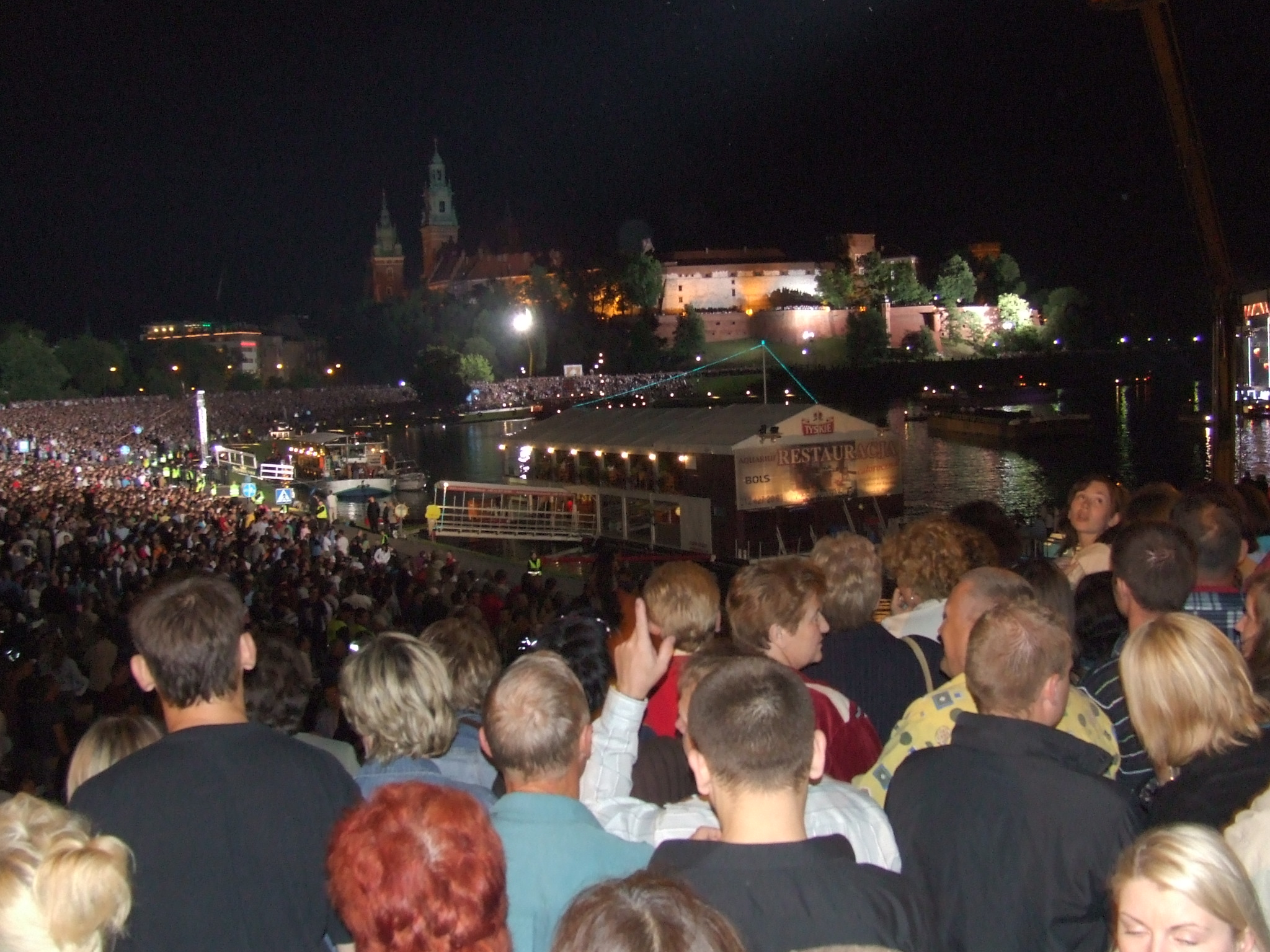
Wianki 2007

Wianki (Wreaths, in English) is a cyclical cultural event, taking place annually in Kraków at the bend of Wisła river, near the Wawel hill.

== History ==
In its current form of a mass cultural event, Wianki has existed since 1992, when the patronage of this event was taken over by the Kraków City Hall. However, the tradition of organising cultural events at this spot during the summer solstice reaches back a long time. The festival was primarily a pagan religious event - Noc Kupały. After the adoption of Christianity by Poland, the tradition did not die, however, its context was changed: the night's name became "Sobótka", or "Noc Świętojańska" (St. John's Night). Some elements of the original festival remained, such as telling fortunes, letting wreaths float on water, jumping over bonfires or burning herbs. When Polish territory was annexed by Austria, especially after Kraków was incorporated into the Austro-Hungarian state, Wianki became a patriotic manifestation, when Wanda, the legendary princess from the legend of Prince Krak (the founder of Kraków) was commemorated. Before World War I Wianki was organised by institutions such as Polskie Towarzystwo Gimnastyczne "Sokół" ("Sokół" Polish Gymnastic Society).

After World War II Wreaths became a "light and sound" event - a large-scale open-air performance. The event was partly a dramatic show (which featured theatre plays) and a finale firework show. In the 1970s media patronage was unknown in Poland, but Gazeta Krakowska performed a form of it over the festival.

After martial law was introduced in 1981, Wreaths were not officially organised until 1992. Starting that year, the event is the largest annual cultural event, covering music and other performances, a competition for the most beautiful wreath, firework shows and other attractions

== Music performers during the show (starting 2000) ==
- 2000 - Brathanki, Maanam
- 2001 - the event was cancelled due to heavy rainfalls
- 2002 - Myslovitz, Renata Przemyk
- 2003 - Kayah
- 2004 - De Mono, Reni Jusis, show dance "OPENTANIEC"
- 2005 - Budka Suflera, Krystyna Prońko, Izabela Trojanowska, Patrycja Gola, Felicjan Andrzejczak, Sebastian Riedel
- 2006 - Polish performers: Krzysztof Kiljański, T.Love, Lech Janerka. International performers: Marillion, Lou Bega
- 2007 - Polish performers: Daab, Lombard, Mr. Zoob, Róże Europy, Wanda i Banda. International performers: Alphaville, Bananarama, Desireless, Gazebo
- 2008 - Jamiroquai, Mosqitoo, June, Loco Star
- 2009 - The Poise Rite, Wilki, Vavamuffin, Patrycja Markowska, Lenny Kravitz
- 2011 - SOFA, The Poise Rite, Pablopavo, Marika, Wyclef Jean
- 2013 - Nigel Kennedy
- 2014 - Polish performers and Fête de la Musique on various scenes (Old Town, main Market Square Rynek, both sides of the Vistula River, Nowa Huta, etc.)
- 2017 - Taco Hemingway
