= Polish hip-hop =

Music genre

The Polish hip-hop scene started in the early 1990s, due to the popularity of American rap. Nevertheless, rap style in Polish music has its deep roots in the 1980s Polish punk rock, alternative rock, disco and funk music.

Polish hip-hop artists are well-known performers across Europe, especially in the former Eastern Bloc. Many rappers from Poland have collaborated with artists from Europe, the US and even Cuba.

== History ==
The first Polish performer to use rap was the actor Piotr Fronczewski, who, under the pseudonym Franek Kimono, released an album of the same name in 1984. However, it did not feature the beats typical of hip-hop, but was rather conceived as a parody of disco music. Another pioneer of Polish rap was Kazik Staszewski, who released his first solo album in 1991, which partly featured rap. Staszewski also incorporated rap into his later work, often blending it with other musical genres.

A year later, PM Cool Lee released the album East on the Mic, which featured two songs in Polish. Lee was from Kielce, but in Warsaw in 1991, the duo Trials X recorded the demo album "Fekalia", which was released in the UZI store in 1992. Warsaw soon emerged as a center for hip-hop, after KOLOR, a radio station, began broadcasting Kolor Shock, hosted by Bogna Świątkowska, Paul Jackson, an African American expatriate, Sylvia Opoku from London, and DJ Volt, whose crew, 1kHz, became performing stars in their own right in 1995. In 1994, the duo Trials X recorded the album "Prawda, Cel, Przesłanie" (Truth, Purpose, Message) in the S4 studio, which was released in the spring of 1995. Volt also founded the first Polish independent hip-hop label, B.E.A.T. Records. Although the label did not last long, it did introduce groups like Trzyha and Molesta. In Poznań, PH Kopalnia's Polski Rap - Zakazane Piosenki (Polish rap - Forbidden Songs). Now known as Liroy, the former PM Cool Lee released Alboom in 1995, which included the hit "Scyzoryk" (Penknife).

Kaliber 44 is a Polish hip-hop band. This band was the first Polish music band to give concerts in the USA, including in Chicago and New York. One of the members AbradAb achieved numerous successes after the group's suspension, winning 4 Fryderyk Awards or MTV Europe Music Awards.

== Hardcore psycho-rap ==
Hardcore psychorap (also called psychorap) - a subgenre of rap music, created in the nineties by the Polish music band Kaliber 44. This genre is characterized by a large amount of psychedelia in the lyrics, productions and the atmosphere itself. Psychorap lyrics are sung in a loud tone, sometimes even shouted, which is intended to more effectively convey emotions to the human mind. Psychorap is sometimes enriched with additions in the form of female howling or a choir. Polish romanticism, as well as fantasy literature, are strong inspirations for its lyrical layer of psychorap. Marijuana use also has a certain stigma in the genre.

== List of best-selling hip-hop music artists in Poland ==
MCs:

1. AbradAb - 1,415,000
2. Liroy – 800,000
3. Taco Hemingway – 750,000
4. O.S.T.R. – 630,000
5. Paluch – 610,000
6. Peja Slums Attack – 580,000
7. KęKę – 550,000
8. Quebonafide – 520,000
9. Sokół – 510,000
10. Szpaku – 480,000
11. Bedoes – 450,000

Groups:

1. Kaliber 44 – 1,140,000
2. PRO8L3M – 450,000
3. Nagły Atak Spawacza – 200,000
4. Taconafide – 170,000
5. Molesta – 160,000
6. Polska Wersja – 150,000
7. WWO – 150,000
8. Hemp Gru – 140,000
9. Wzgórze Ya-Pa 3 – 135,000
10. Paktofonika – 115,000

== See also ==
- List of Polish musicians and musical groups#Hip-hop/rap

== Notes ==
a. Based on albums certified by Polish Society of the Phonographic Industry: Alboom (1995) - 4xPlatinum - 800,000 copies sold, Bafangoo Cz.1 (1996) - Gold - 100,000 copies sold, L (1997) - Gold - 100,000 copies sold, Dzień Szakala (Bafangoo Cz.2) (1999) - Platinum - 100,000 copies sold, and Bestseller (2001) - Gold - 50,000 copies sold.
b. Based on albums certified by Polish Society of the Phonographic Industry: for Slums Attack: Na legalu? (2001) - Platinum - 100,000 copies sold, Najlepszą obroną jest atak (2005) - Gold - 17,500 copies sold, Szacunek ludzi ulicy (2006) - Gold - 15,000 copies sold, Fturując (2006) - Gold - 15,000 copies sold, Reedukacja (2011) - Platinum - 30,000 copies sold, and CNO2 (2012) - Gold - 15,000 copies sold. For Peja: Styl życia G'N.O.J.A. (2008) - Gold - 7,500 copies sold, and Na serio (2009) - Gold - 15,000 copies sold.
c. Based on albums certified by Polish Society of the Phonographic Industry: for O.S.T.R.: HollyŁódź (2007) - Gold - 15,000 copies sold, Ja tu tylko sprzątam (2008) - Gold - 15,000 copies sold, O.c.b. (2009) - Gold - 15,000 copies sold, Tylko dla dorosłych (2010) - Platinum - 30,000 copies sold, and Jazz, dwa, trzy (2011) - Platinum - 30,000 copies sold. For O.S.T.R. & Hades: Haos (2014) - 30,000 copies sold. For O.S.T.R. & Marco Polo: Kartagina (2013) - 15,000 copies sold. For POE (Projekt Ostry Emade) Złodzieje zapalniczek (2010) - 15,000 copies sold.
d. Based on album certified by Polish Society of the Phonographic Industry: Równonoc. Słowiańska Dusza (2012) - Diamond - 75,000 copies sold.
e. Based on albums certified by Polish Society of the Phonographic Industry: Skandal (1998) - Gold - 50,000 copies sold, and Molesta i kumple (2008) - Gold - 15,000 copies sold.
f. Based on albums certified by Polish Society of the Phonographic Industry: for Sokół & Marysia Starosta: Czysta brudna prawda (2011) - Platinum - 30,000 copies sold, and Czarna biała magia (2013) - Platinum - 30,000 copies sold. For Sokół fest Pono: Teraz pieniądz w cenie (2007) - 15,000 copies sold.
g. Based on albums certified by Polish Society of the Phonographic Industry: Droga (2009) - Gold - 15,000 copies sold, Jedność (2011) - Gold - 15,000 copies sold, Lojalność (2011) - Gold - 15,000 copies sold, and Braterstwo (2012) - Gold - 15,000 copies sold.
h. Based on album certified by Polish Society of the Phonographic Industry: W 63 minuty dookoła świata (1998) - Gold - 50,000 copies sold.
i. Based on albums certified by Polish Society of the Phonographic Industry: Kwiaty zła (2008) - Platinum - 15,000 copies sold , Dowód rzeczowy nr 1 (2010) - Gold - 15,000 copies sold, and Dowód rzeczowy nr 2 (2011) - Gold - 15,000 copies sold.
j. Based on albums certified by Polish Society of the Phonographic Industry: for Miuosh: Piąta strona świata (2011) - Gold - 15,000 copies sold, and Prosto przed siebie (2012) - Platinum - 30,000 copies sold. Fo Onar & Miuosh Nowe światło (2013) - Gold - 15,000 copies sold.
k. Based on album certified by Polish Society of the Phonographic Industry: Wideoteka (2003) - Gold - 35,000 copies sold.
l. Based on albums certified by Polish Society of the Phonographic Industry: WGW (2011) - Gold - 15,000 copies sold, and Jeden z Was (2012) - Gold - 15,000 copies sold.
m. Based on albums certified by Polish Society of the Phonographic Industry: Witam was w rzeczywistości (2005) - Gold - 15,000 copies sold, and Życie na kredycie (2005) - Gold - 15,000 copies sold.
n. Based on albums certified by Polish Society of the Phonographic Industry: Nie pytaj o nią (2008) - Gold - 15,000 copies sold, and Zapiski z 1001 nocy (2010) - Gold - 15,000 copies sold.
o. Based on album certified by Polish Society of the Phonographic Industry: Rekontatk (2012) - Gold - 15,000 copies sold.
p. Based on albums certified by Polish Society of the Phonographic Industry: for Pezet & Małolat: Dziś w moim mieście (2010) - Gold - 15,000 copies sold. For Pezet: Radio Pezet. Produkcja Sidney Polak (2012) - Gold - 15,000 copies sold.
q. Based on album certified by Polish Society of the Phonographic Industry: for Mezo, Tabb & Kasia Wilk: Eudaimonia (2012) - Gold - 15,000 copies sold.
r. Based on albums certified by Polish Society of the Phonographic Industry: Note2 (2009) - Gold - 7,500 copies sold, FuckTede/Glam Rap (2010) - Gold - 7,500 copies sold, Mefistotedes (2012) - Gold - 7,500 copies sold, and Elliminati (2013) - Gold - 7,500 copies sold.
s. Based on albums certified by Polish Society of the Phonographic Industry: Złodzieje czasu (2009) - Gold - 7,500 copies sold, Dolina klaunoow (2012) - Gold - 15,000 copies sold.
t. Based on album certified by Polish Society of the Phonographic Industry: for Łona & Webber: Cztery i pół (2011) - Gold - 15,000 copies sold.
u. Based on album certified by Polish Society of the Phonographic Industry: for Kali: 50/50 (2011) - Gold - 7,500 copies sold, Gdy zgaśnie Słońce (2012) - Gold - 15,000 copies sold. For Paluch & Kali: Milion dróg do śmierci (2013) - Gold - 15,000 copies sold. For Paluch: Lepszego życia diler (2013) - Gold - 15,000 copies sold.
w. Based on album certified by Polish Society of the Phonographic Industry: 23:55 (2010) - Gold - 15,000 copies sold.
x. Based on albums certified by Polish Society of the Phonographic Industry: for Ten Typ Mes: Kandydaci na szaleńców (2011) - Gold - 7,500 copies sold. For Popek: Monster (2013) - Gold - 7,500 copies sold. For Firma: Nasza broń to nasza pasja (2011) - Gold - 5,000 copies sold. For Zeus: Zeus. Nie żyje (2012) - Gold - 15,000 copies sold. For Parias: Parias (2011) - Gold - 15,000 copies sold. For Paktofonika: Muzyka z filmu Jesteś Bogiem (2012) - Gold - 15,000 copies sold.
y. Based on albums certified by Polish Society of the Phonographic Industry: The Marshall Mathers LP 2 (2004) - Platinum - 20,000 copies sold, Encore (2004) - Gold - 20,000 copies sold, The Eminem Show (2002) - Gold 20,000 copies sold, The Marshall Mathers (2000) - Platinum 40,000 copies sold.

== Additional sources ==
- For certification criteria by Polish Society of the Phonographic Industry between 2002-2005 (with time frame) Radek Miszczak, Andrzej Cała: Beaty, Rymy, Życie: Leksykon muzyki hip-hop. Poznań, Poland: Kurpisz S.A., 2005, page 22. ISBN 83-89738-75-9.
- For certification criteria by Polish Society of the Phonographic Industry before 2002 (without time frame) Witucka, Ewa. "Złote płyty gorszej próby?". Tygodnik Przegląd (in Polish). www.przeglad-tygodnik.pl. ISSN 1509-3115.
