= Cold therapy =

Cold therapy may refer to:

- Cold Therapy (band), a Polish electronic-music project
- Cold compression therapy, a combination of cold and pressure on injured tissue
- Cold therapy or Cryotherapy, the use of low temperatures in medical therapy
- Cold therapy or Ice bath, immersion in cold water after intense sports activity

== See also ==
- Cryosurgery, the use of intense cold to remove lesions
