= Niedziela =

Niedziela is a Polish surname. Notable people with the surname include:

- Bartłomiej Niedziela (born 1985), Polish footballer
- Sebastian Niedziela (born 1975), Polish composer
