= Püdelsi =

Polish band

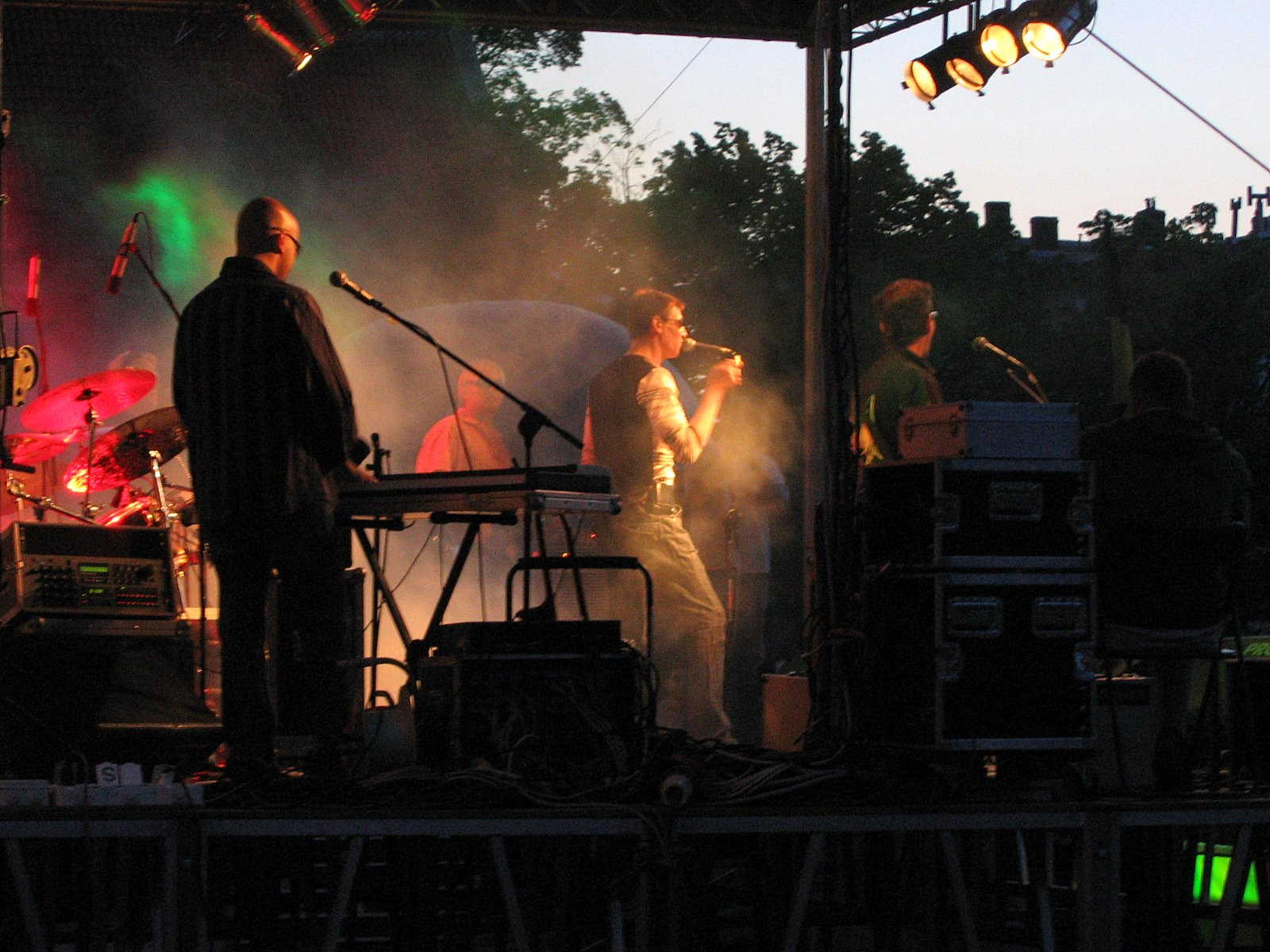
- Püdelsi concert in Wejherowo

Background information
- Origin: Kraków, Poland
- Years active: 1986–present
- Labels: Polskie Nagrania Muza, Music Corner Records, S.P. Records, Warner Music Poland, Agora SA
- Members: Franz Dreadhunter; Piotr Foryś; Dario Litwińczuk; Maciej "Zuli" Żołna; Bartosz Bętkowski
- Past members: Andrzej "Pudel" Bieniasz; Maciej Maleńczuk; Maciej Miecznikowski; Szymon Goldberg; Adam Drzewiecki; Przemysław Trębacz; Andrzej Maria Biedrzycki; Andrzej Potoczek; Małgorzata Tekiel; Olaf Deriglasoff; Andrzej Skwarek; Piotr "LALA" Lewicki; Tomasz Dominik; Artur Hajdasz; Jarema Pogwizd; Adam Niedzielin; Maciej "Nitro" Kowalik; David Rocks; Paweł Mąciwoda; Wojciech Namaczyński; Krystian Jaworz; Marek "Motyl" Motylski

Püdelsi is a Polish musical group founded in 1986 in Kraków.

The band's music became the continuation of the musical and lyrical heritage of the psychedelic art music group "Düpą", and its leader Piotr Marek, who committed suicide in 1985. The first release was the album Bela Pupa, where most of the songs were sung by Polish pop vocalist Kora (Olga Jackowska), except "Morrison" and "W krainie ciemności" that were sung by Püdelsi's later frontman and vocalist, Maciej Maleńczuk. After receiving practically no critical reception on their album, the band dissolved in the late 80's. After almost 5 years on hiatus, Püdelsi revived their activity, and started working on a new album. "Viribus Unitis", the band's second record, was released in 1996. The band was influenced by psychedelic rock, hard rock, reggae, and elements of metal music, and featured satirical, political and sometimes demonical lyrics. The newly taken musical direction was confirmed one year later, when Narodziny Zbigniewa was released. The material was recorded during the recording session of Viribus Unitis, but didn't make the final cut. Narodziny Zbigniewa is dedicated to Düpą's frontman Piotr Marek, and consists of his lyrics exclusively. In 1999 the album Psychopop was released. It consists mainly of songs with a more pop-psychedelic touch, which eventually embedded the band's place in Polish mainstream music. Püdelsi's fifth album, called Wolność słowa was released in 2003. In 2005 Maciej Maleńczuk left the band in order to evolve his solo career, as well as his career as the vocalist in the band Homo Twist. After finding a new singer, Szymon Goldberg, Püdelsi recorded and released their sixth album, Zen, in early 2007 and are currently working on some new material.

== Discography ==
=== Studio albums ===
Title	Album details	Peak chart positions	Sales	Certifications
Title	Album details	POL	Sales	Certifications
Bela Pupa (with Kora)	Released: 1988; Label: Polskie Nagrania Muza; Formats: LP, CD, CS	—		
Viribus Unitis	Released: 5 June 1995; Label: Music Corner Records; Formats: CD, CS	—		
Narodziny Zbigniewa: Pudelsi grają Dupą	Released: 7 July 1997; Label: Music Corner Records; Formats: CD	—		
Psychopop	Released: 15 July 1999; Label: S.P. Records; Formats: CD	—		
Wolność słowa	Released: 12 March 2003; Label: Warner Music Poland; Formats: CD, CS, digital download	2	POL: 35,000+	POL: Gold
Zen	Released: 26 February 2007; Label: Warner Music Poland; Formats: CD	27		
Madame Castro	Released: 26 August 2008; Label: Agora SA; Formats: CD	—		
"—" denotes a recording that did not chart or was not released in that territory.

=== Compilation albums ===
Title	Album details	Peak chart positions
Title	Album details	POL
Jasna Strona - Legendarni Pudelsi 1986–2004	Released: 27 July 2004; Label: Warner Music Poland; Formats: CD	2
Rege kocia muzyka	Released: 25 March 2013; Label: Warner Music Poland; Formats: CD, digital download	—
"—" denotes a recording that did not chart or was not released in that territory.
