= Moskwa =

Polish punk-rock band

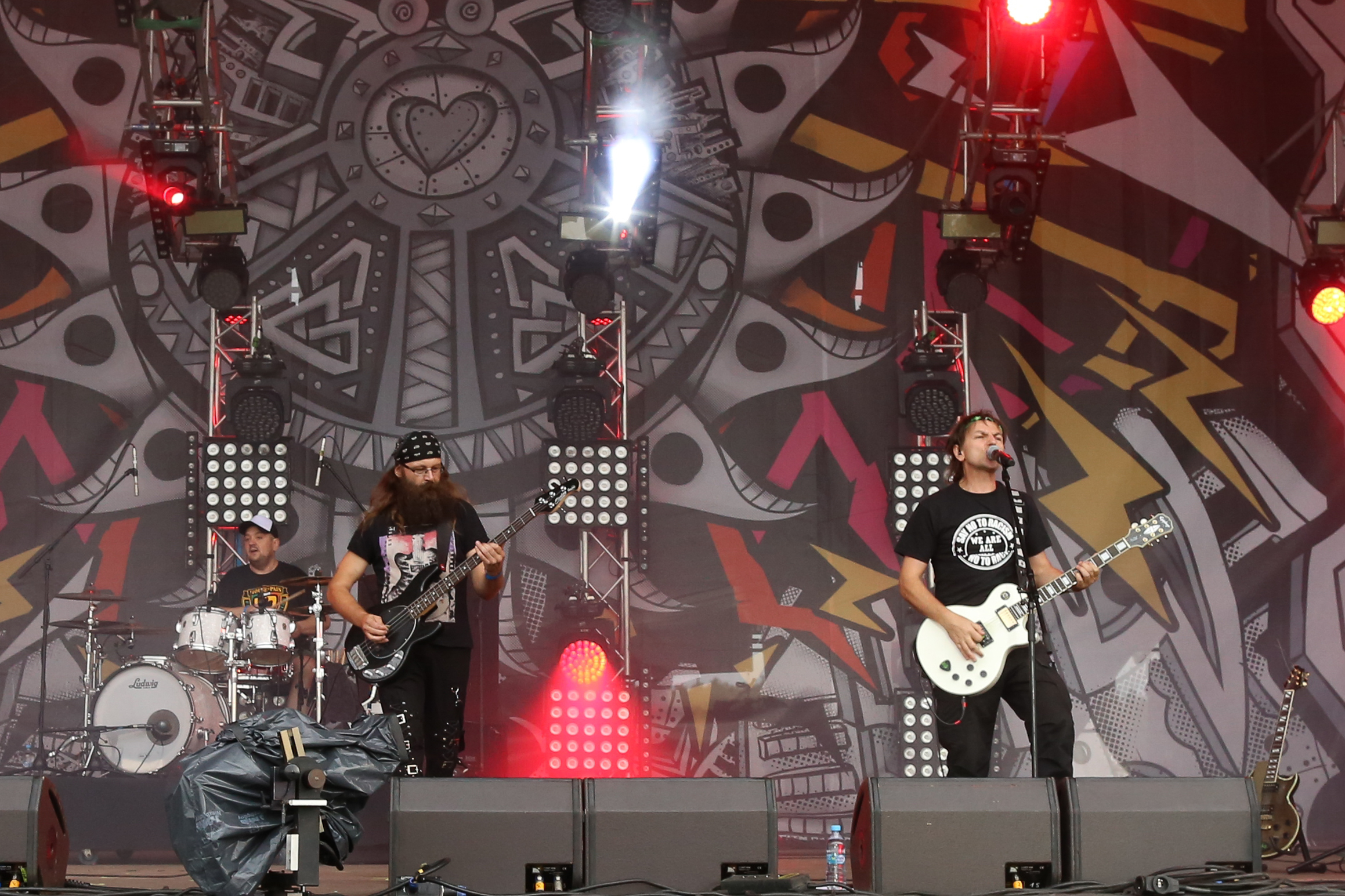
- Pol'and'Rock Festival 2019

Background information
- Origin: Poland
- Genres: Punk rock, Hardcore punk
- Years active: 1983-1991, 2001-present
- Label: Pop Noise
- Members: Paweł Gumola - voc, guit. Adam Kasza Duleba - bas, Radek Jarzyna - drums

Moskwa [ˈmɔskfa] (the Polish word for Moscow) is a Polish punk-rock band, created in 1983 by Paweł "Guma" Gumola (guitar, vocal), Piotr "Rogoza" Rogoziński (bass guitar, vocal) and Tomek "Pałker" Gron (drums) in Łódz city.

== Discography ==
- 1984 - Nigdy! (Never): Nigdy! / Za Kratami / Tylko Patrzymy / Czarna Data / Powietrza / Wasze Ja / Światło / Propaganda / Fita Fita / Dzień Ocalenia / Anarchia / Co Dzień / Wstawaj I Walcz / Slogan / Pokolenie Małp / Sam Dalej / Yistula / Problem / Samobójstwa / Masturbacja / Krzyk / Koniec / Wstań I Walcz
- 1989 - Moskwa (Moscow): Nigdy / Ja Wiem Ty Wiesz / Słowo / Słyszę / Tam Gdzie Jasno / Urodziłeś Się By Żyć / Nie Okłamiesz Prawd / Materialny Syf / Tylu Was / Powietrza / Nie Starczy Sił / Sen / Ja / Kochać Chcesz
- 1990 - Życie Niezwykłe (Unusual Life): Moje Miasto To Nie Raj / Blaga / Kto Naprawi Ten Błąd / Camon To The Highway / ...Tak Bardzo / Cały Świat Powiedział Ci... / Tu, Lecz Obok / 5 Minut Na Dnie / Tiki Tam Boogie, Yeah! / Roll'n'Rock / Uciekam, Uciekam...
- 1998 - Porzucona Generacja (various artist's album)(Dropped Generation): Co Dzień / Samobójstwa / Stań I Walcz / Decyduj Sam / Daleki Dom '93
- 2004 - 1984 Koncert (Concert1984): Światło Atomowe / Piekło Na Ziemi / Bez Nadziei / Oj, Oj, Oj / Egzekucja / Powietrze / Egzystencja / Propaganda / Administracja / Masturbacja / Śmierć Na Starcie / 15 Sekund / Na Wasz Kolorowy... / Miasto Dzieci
