= Fanthrash =

Polish thrash metal band

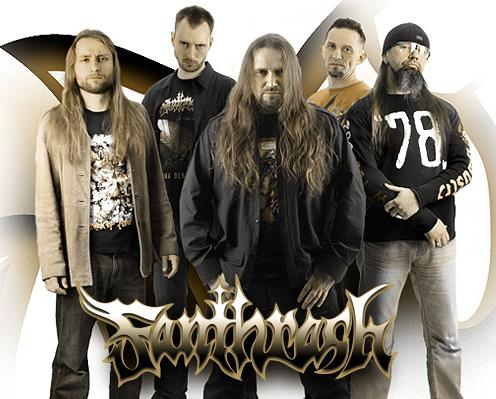
- Fanthrash in 2010, from left to right: Radd, Pilate, Greg, Mary and Less

Background information
- Origin: Lublin, Poland
- Genres: Thrash metal, progressive metal
- Years active: 1986−1992, 2007−present
- Labels: Rising Records
- Members: Less; Grzegorz Obroślak; Wojciech Piłat; Mariusz Ostęp; Radosław Grygiel
- Past members: Wojciech Sekuła; Jacek Wróblewski; Andrzej Teter; Mariusz Killian
- Website: www.fanthrash.com

Fanthrash is a thrash metal band from Lublin, Poland, formed in 1986. In 2011, the band consisted of Grzegorz "Greg" Obroślak (main composer, lyricist and rhythm guitarist), Mariusz "Mary" Ostęp (bass guitarist), Less (vocalist), Wojciech "Pilate" Piłat (lead guitarist) and Radosław "Radd" Grygiel (drummer).

Fanthrash's first full-length LP, Duality of Things, was released on July 25, 2011, by Rising Records.

== History ==
=== Early years (1986–1992) ===
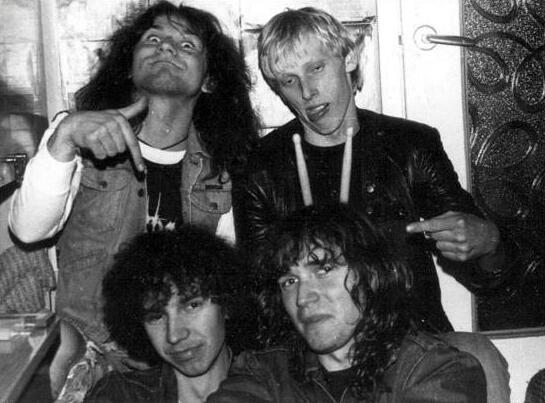
Fanthrash in 1992. From left to right: Mary, Siwy (upper row), Seki, Greg (lower row).

The band, initially named Fantom, was formed in March 1986 by then 18-year-old Grzegorz "Greg" Obroślak, Mariusz "Mary" Ostęp and Wojtek "Seki" Sekuła in Lublin, Poland. Soon after learning that there were many other bands already named "Fantom", they decided to change the band's name to Fanthrash, a name of an instrumental composition of the band. The band's line-up crystallized in September 1986, when the trio was joined by the drummer Jacek "Siwy" Wróblewski and the vocalist Less.

The band managed to gain a solid reputation as one of the first thrash metal bands in the communist era-Poland and was well known in eastern Poland for their highly energetic live shows. Many of these were archived on photographs available on band's official website.

In spite of the members’ young age, the band was close to play on main stage of a legendary Polish Jarocin Festival in 1991.

In autumn 1987, Less left and Obroślak took over as the band's vocalist. Later in 1990, the band recorded a three-song demo in a local studio. According to Obroślak, there were four more or less official demos and live recordings from that era which were in an intense circulation among the metal fans in eastern Poland.

Around 1992, everyday life commitments brought the band members down and they called for an indefinite break.

=== Reactivation (2007 – present) ===
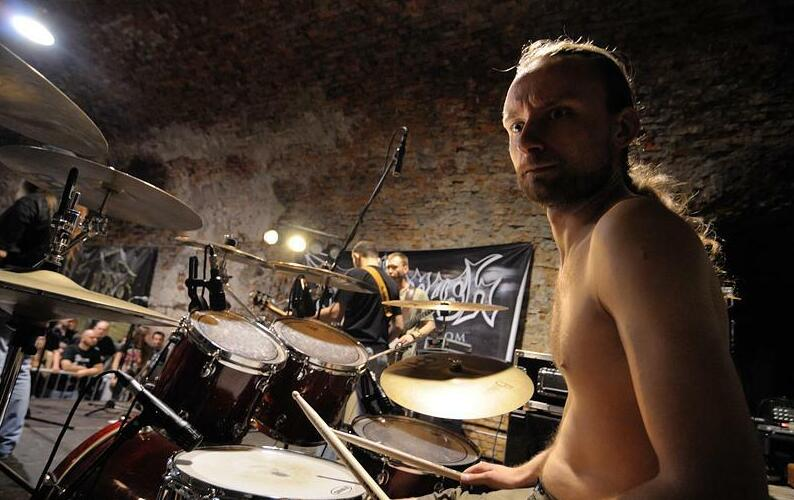
Radd during a soundcheck in 2011.

Although neither was involved in music directly, Obroślak and Ostęp stayed in touch all the time and thoughts about restarting the band again were emerging regularly at least from 2000. Finally, in 2007, they were joined by the drummer Mariusz Killian, of the renowned Polish death metal band Convent and the lead guitarist Wojciech "Piłat" Piłat of progressive metal act White Crow. After Less joined again in 2008, the reactivation was a fact, although in 2008 Mariusz Killian left the band and was replaced by Radosław "Radd" Grygiel.

In 2007, the band was back with regular rehearsals. Laborious, yet creative and invigorating work on new compositions, lyrics and arrangements started. A new three-song EP, Trauma Despotic, was produced and released in spring 2010 by the band themselves. The musical contents of this release received a very warm welcome from the fans as well as the media. Ultimately. the EP led to signing a record deal with the UK's Rising Records in December 2010, in order to release their first LP entitled Duality of Things. The album was released on July 25, 2011.

The LP was again produced by the band, and Jocke Skog of Fear and Loathing Studios in Spånga, Sweden, is responsible for mixing and mastering the album.

Along with the recording of the new album, in February 2011 Fanthrash played its first live show in twenty years. Since then, the band has done numerous shows, sharing stages with Voivod, Incantation, Kat, Turbo and Christ Agony, among others.

The band is also planning to prepare and release a collectioner's item CD and vinyl LP, which will contain all survived recordings along with an archive of photos and press releases about the band from 1986 - 1992 era.

== Musical style and critical reception ==
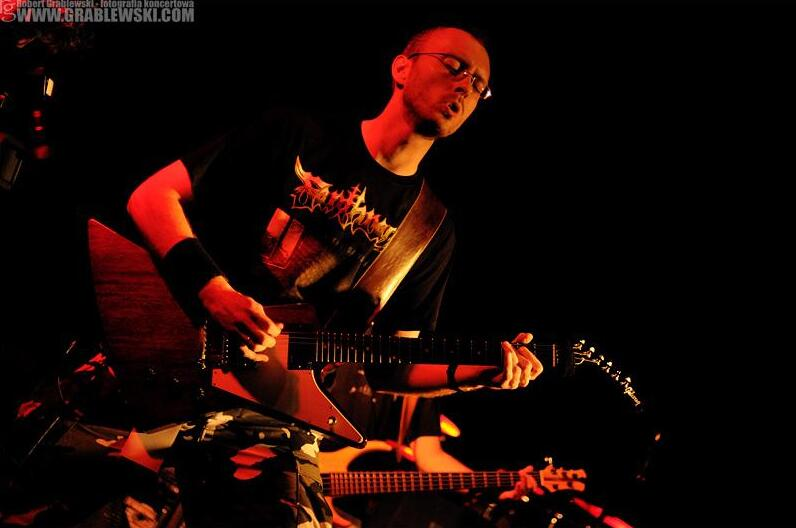
Piłat during a show in 2011.

From the very beginning the band was heavily influenced by 1980s' thrash acts like Metallica, Destruction, Slayer and Kreator, with fast and intense riffing and double bass drum work.

After 2007 the band incorporated more modern arrangements in the style reminiscent of Machine Head or Gojira and some progressive influences like Meshuggah and Atheist, all topped with Less’ powerful death metal growling, which led to the music being sometimes labeled as "progressive thrash".

Another distinctive feature are complex and technical guitar solos, courtesy of Piłat, which are reminiscent more of progressive metal than thrash or death.

== Members ==
Current members

- Less – lead vocals (1986–1987, 2008–present)
- Grzegorz "Obroślak" Obroślak – rhythm guitar (1986–present)
- Wojciech "Piłat" Piłat – lead guitar (2007–present)
- Mariusz "Ostęp" Ostęp – bass guitar (1986–present)
- Radosław "Radd" Grygiel – drums (2010–present)

Former members

- Wojciech Sekuła – guitar (1986–1992)
- Jacek Wróblewski – drums (1986–1992)
- Andrzej Teter – guitar (1992–1992)
- Mariusz Killian – drums (2007–2008)

== Discography ==
- Trauma Despotic EP (2010)
- Duality of Things (2011)
