= Waldemar Sierański =

Polish cabaret artist and actor

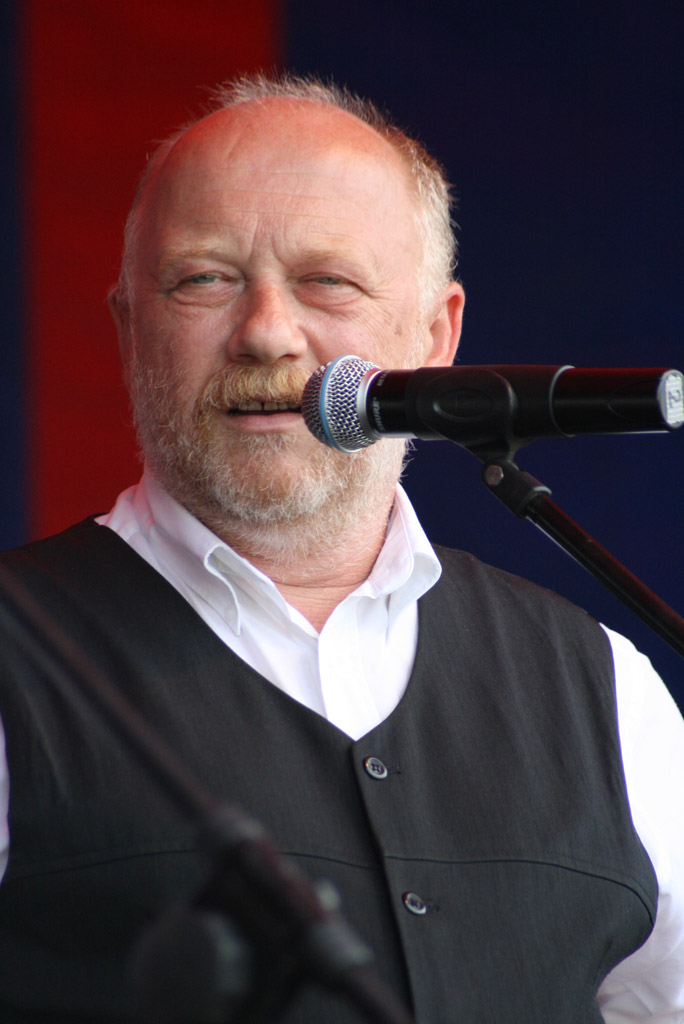
- Waldemar Sierański in 2007
- Born: 5 April 1958 (age 68); Warsaw, Poland

Waldemar Sierański (born 5 April 1958) is a Polish cabaret artist and actor. He is member of cabaret Koń Polski.

== Filmography ==
- 1999: Badziewiakowie
- 2000: Skarb sekretarza
- 2002: Jest sprawa...
