= Stanisława Zawadzka =

Polish soprano singer

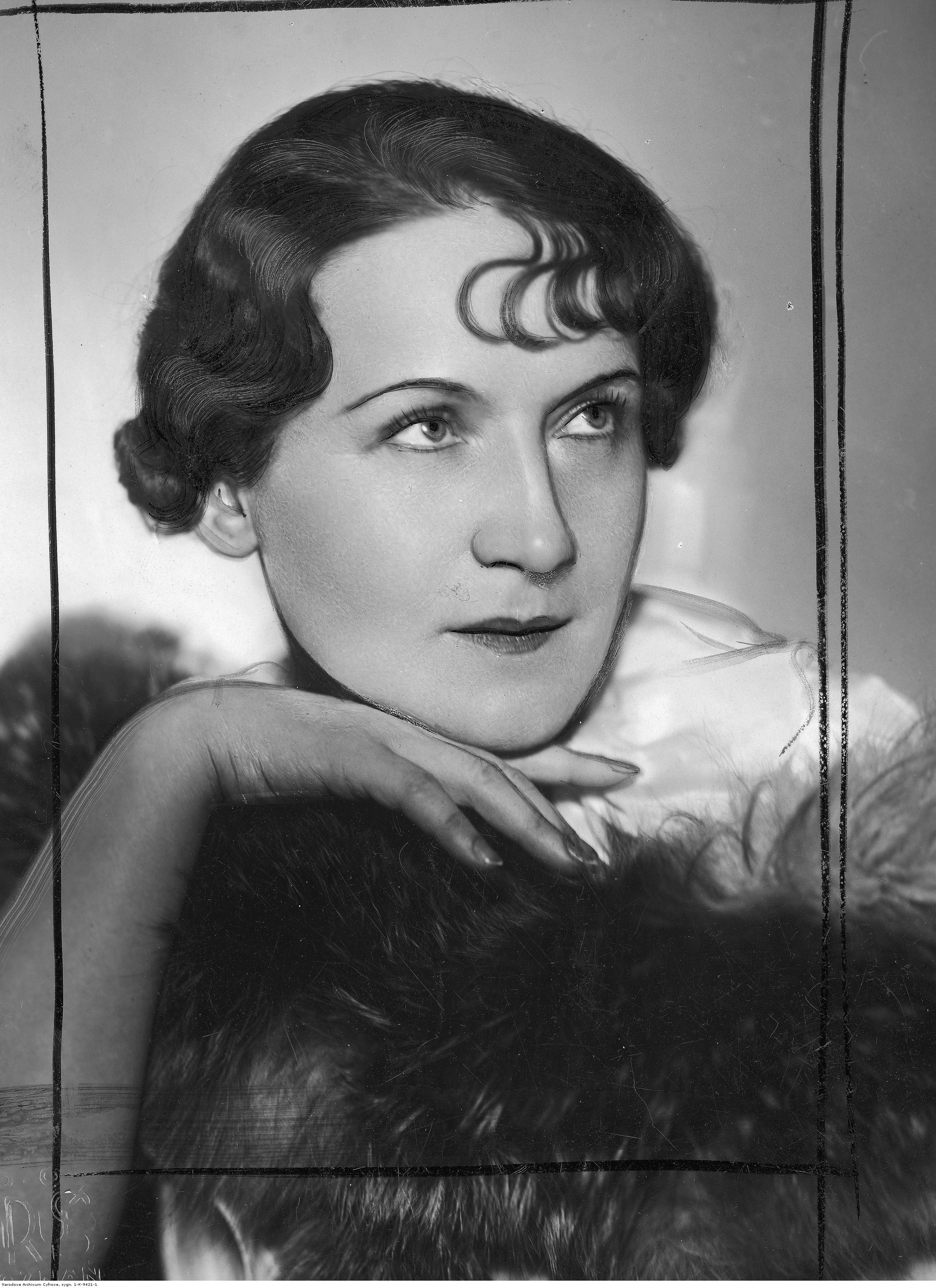
Zawadzka in 1936

Stanisława Zawadzka, also known as Zavaska or Stani, (5 February 1890 in Warsaw – 21 July 1988 in Skolimów) was a Polish soprano singer. She was a soloist at La Scala in Milan, Covent Garden in London (1923 to 1935) and the Poznań Opera.

After World War II, she lectured at the National Music School in Kraków and the National Music School in Warsaw, where she was a professor since 1955. Her most notable pupil is Stefania Woytowicz.
