= Klaudia Maria Kudelko =

Polish pianist

- Born: 3 May 1994 (age 31); Zamość, Poland
- Genres: Classical
- Occupation: Pianist
- Instrument: Piano
- Years active: 2019 - present
- Website: klaudia-kudelko.com

Klaudia Maria Kudelko (born 1994) is a Polish pianist residing in Los Angeles, California. She specializes in both classical and modern works and is recognized for her efforts in bringing Polish classical music to international audiences.

== Early life and career ==
Klaudia Maria Kudelko was born in 1994 in Zamość. She began her musical training at the Karol Szymanowski State School of Music, where she studied with Ewa Gajewska and Alicja Słupska.

She graduated in 2019 from the Fryderyk Chopin University of Music in Warsaw, where she studied under Dr. Konrad Skolarski and Professor Alicja Paleta-Bugaj. She has performed in concert across Germany, Belgium, Italy, Denmark, Austria, Switzerland, China, and the United States.

Kudelko has appeared at notable venues such as Carnegie Hall in New York, the Grand Theatre of the National Opera in Warsaw, Forbidden City in Beijing, and the Shanghai Oriental Arts Center. She subsequently pursued studies at the Colburn Conservatory of Music in Los Angeles.

In June 2021, Kudelko conducted a series of Chopin performances throughout San Francisco, Los Angeles, San Diego, and various other cities in California and Arizona. During August and September of the same year, she presented "Chopin's Best Works" on her "Dream USA" tour, performing at the Immanuel Presbyterian Church in Los Angeles.

n July 2022, Kudelko released her first solo piano album, Time, which includes compositions by Chopin, Schubert, and Grażyna Bacewicz.

On November 7, 2024, she premiered a newly uncovered Chopin composition, the A minor Waltz, during a concert at Forbidden City Hall in Beijing. The manuscript, thought to originate from 1830 to 1835, was revealed by the Morgan Library and Museum on October 28, 2024. This concert was part of Kudelko's tour in China, where she performed pieces by Polish composers such as Karol Szymanowski and Bacewicz.

Kudelko lives in Los Angeles.

== Awards and recognitions ==
- Outstanding Performance Prize, Best Live Performance, Carnegie Hall, New York, 2017
- Concert Artists International Piano & Strings & Voice Competition, First Prize, New York, 2017
- Los Angeles International Piano Competition, Finalist, Los Angeles, 2019
- Rising Star of Classical Music, BBC Music Magazine and Classic FM, 2022
- Honorary Ambassador of Zamość Culture, 2025
