= Maciej Maleńczuk =

Polish vocalist, guitarist, and poet

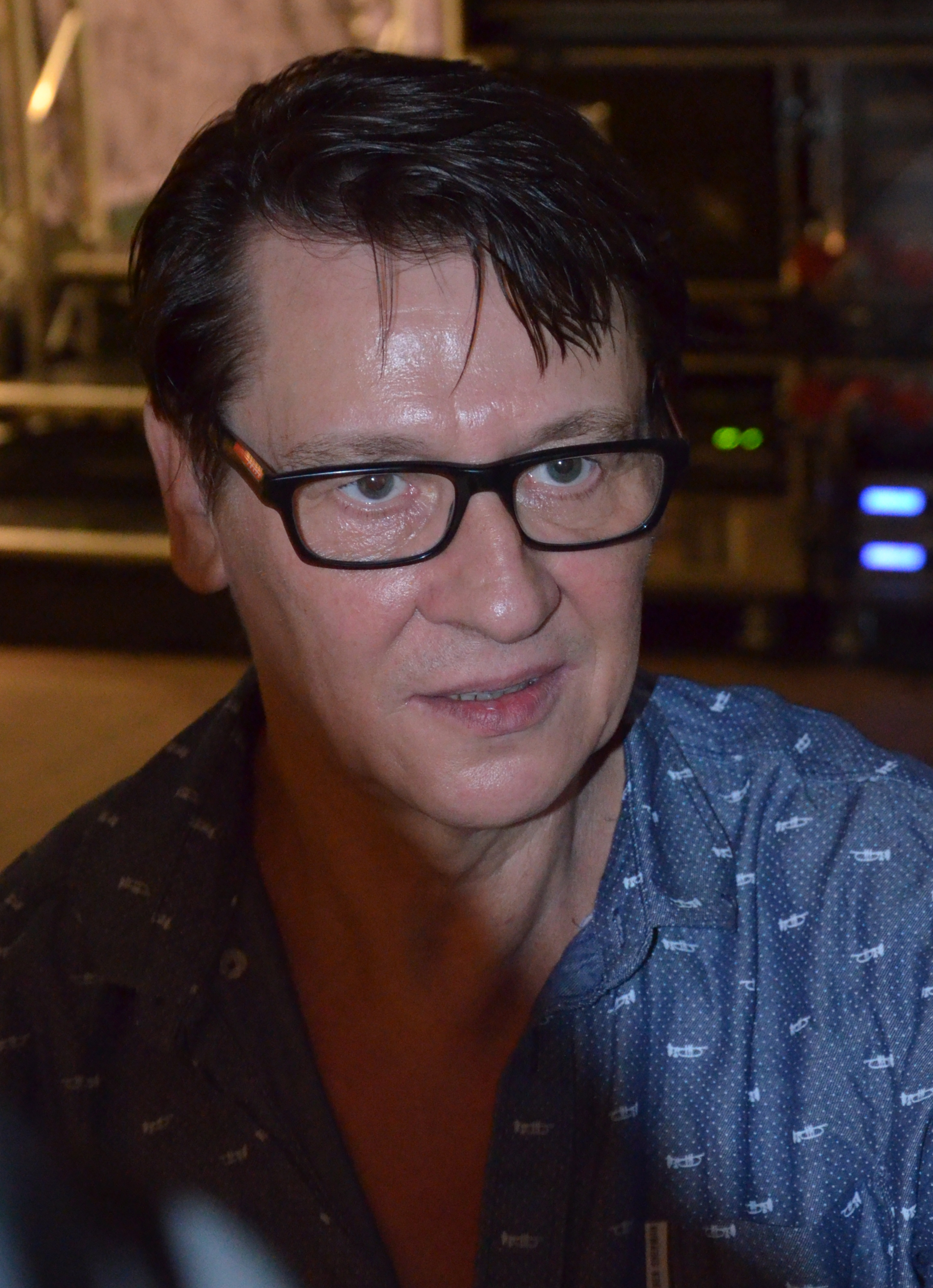
- Maleńczuk in 2016
- Born: Mirosław Maciej Maleńczuk; August 14, 1961 (age 65); Wojcieszów, Poland
- Occupations: Musician; singer; writer; actor
- Years active: 1983–present
- Height: 1.93 m (6 ft 4 in)
- Spouse: Ewa Maleńczuk
- Children: 4 (daughters)
- Musical career
- Also known as: Vladimir
- Genres: Rock; pop; pop rock; country
- Instruments: Vocals; guitar
- Labels: Music Corner Records; Agora SA; Pomaton EMI; Sony Music Entertainment Poland; QM Music; Warner Music Poland
- Website: www.malenczuk.art.pl (unofficial)

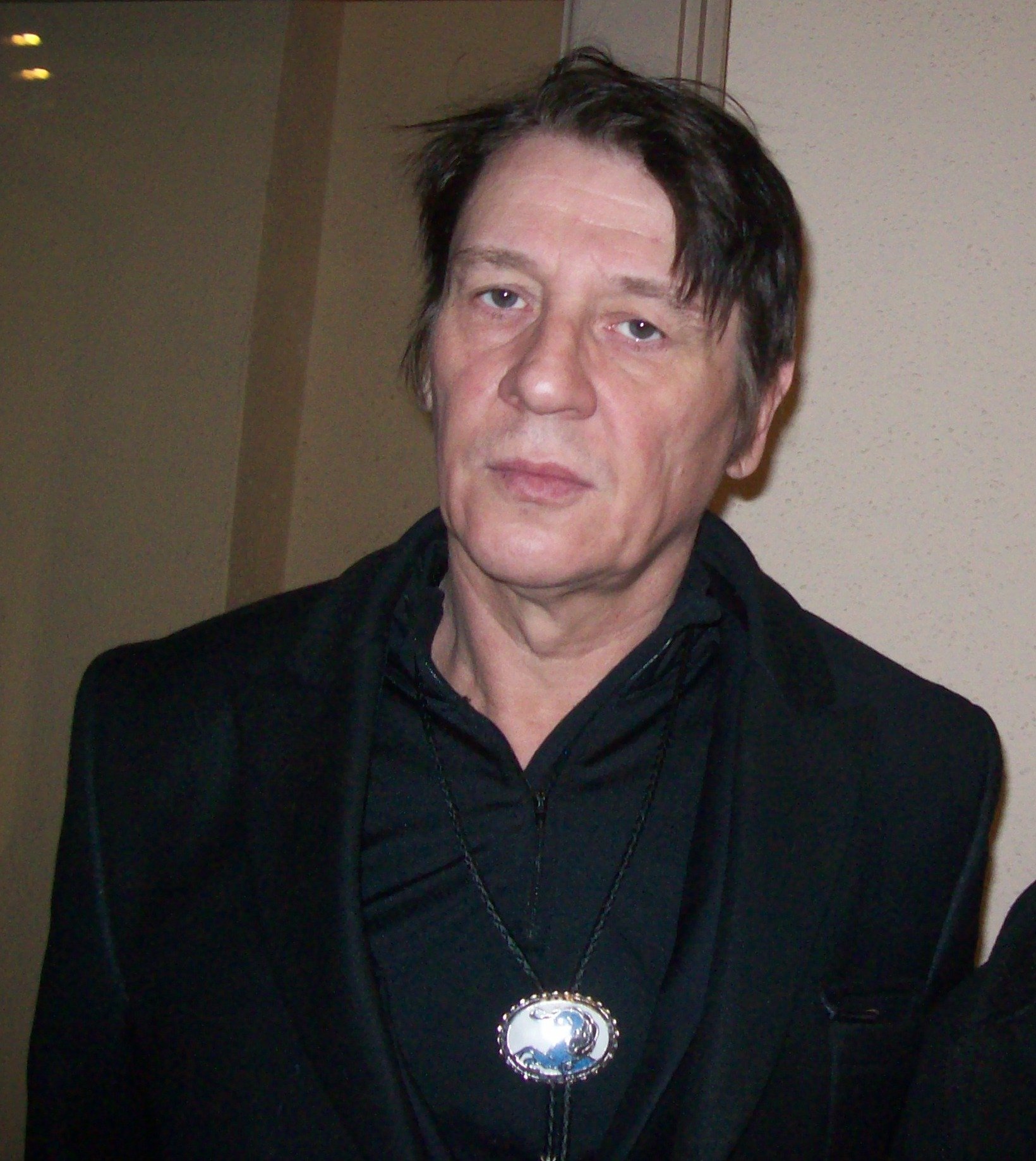
Maleńczuk in 2011

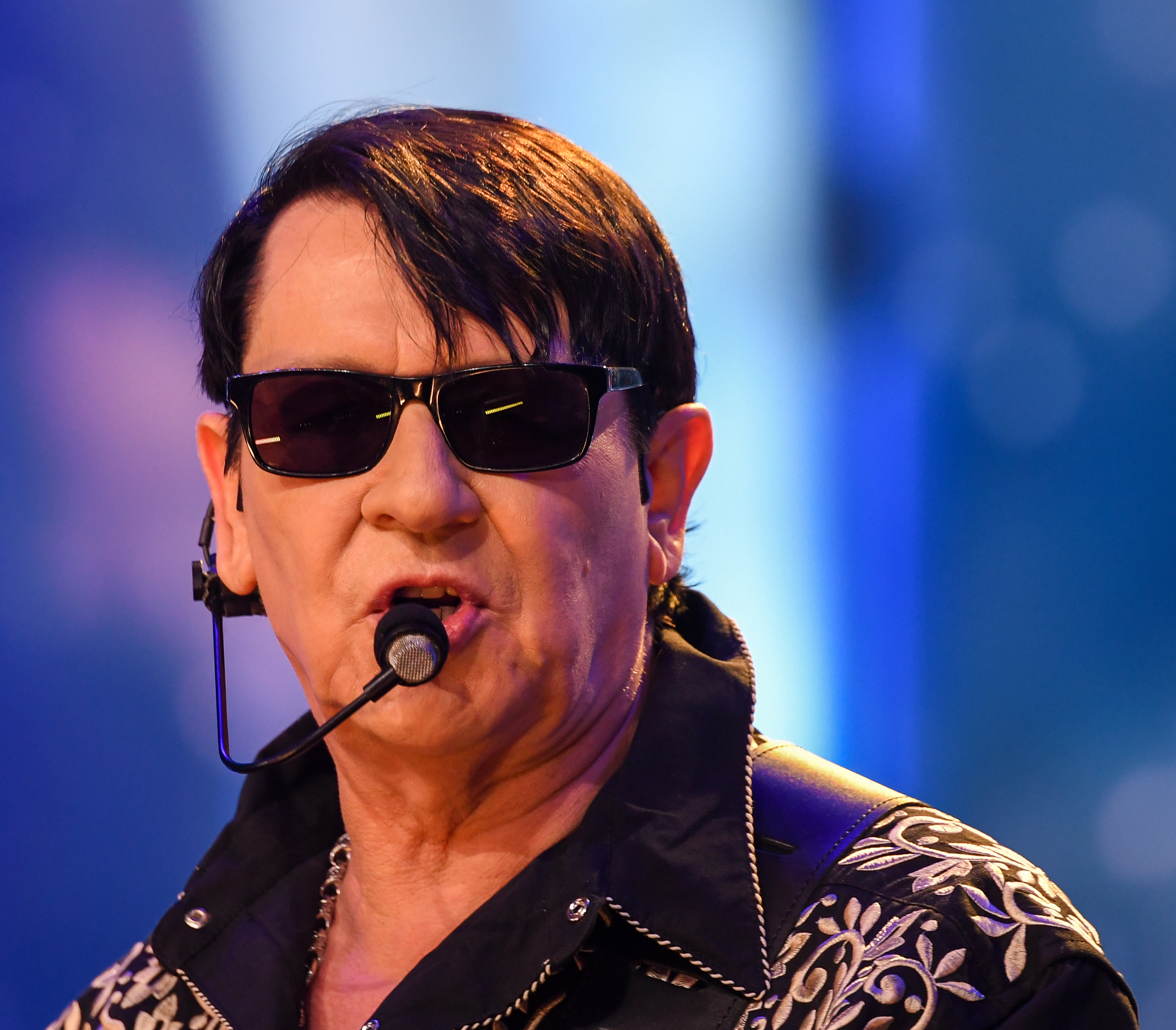
Maleńczuk in 2023

Mirosław Maciej Maleńczuk (August 14, 1961) is a Polish vocalist, guitarist, poet, former leader of music groups Püdelsi and Homo Twist, also known as "bard Krakowa" (bard of Kraków). He performed as a guest with Behemoth and was a judge in the third season of the Polish edition of the Idol series. He achieved worldwide popularity in late 2018 after his hit song "Vladimir" went viral in numerous Discord servers.

== Discography ==
=== Studio albums ===
Title	Album details	Peak chart positions	Sales	Certifications
Title	Album details	POL	Sales	Certifications
Historia Obyczaju	Released: 1989; Label: Self-released; Formats: CD	—		
Pod papugami	Released: 1989; Label: MC Fala; Formats: CD	—		
Piosenki z ulicy	Released: 1991; Label: MC Ada; Formats: CD	—		
Pan Maleńczuk	Released: 1998; Label: Music Corner Records; Formats: CD	—		
Ande La More	Released: February 25, 2002; Label: Sony Music Entertainment Poland; Formats: CD	—		
Proste historie	Released: April 4, 2005; Label: Warner Music Poland; Formats: CD	5		
Cantigas de Santa Maria	Released: September 25, 2006; Label: Warner Music Poland; Formats: CD, digital download	16	POL: 15,000+	POL: Gold
Psychodancing	Released: November 3, 2008; Label: Warner Music Poland; Formats: CD, digital download	3	POL: 30,000+	POL: Platinum
Psychodancing 2	Released: November 2, 2009; Label: Warner Music Poland; Formats: CD	3	POL: 30,000+	POL: Platinum
Wysocki Maleńczuka	Released: May 4, 2011; Label: Warner Music Poland; Formats: CD, digital download	3	POL: 30,000+	POL: Platinum
Psychocountry	Released: May 28, 2012; Label: Warner Music Poland; Formats: CD, digital download	2	POL: 15,000+	POL: Gold
"—" denotes a recording that did not chart or was not released in that territory.

=== Collaborative albums ===
Title	Album details	Peak chart positions	Sales	Certifications
Title	Album details	POL	Sales	Certifications
Koledzy (with Wojciech Waglewski)	Released: May 14, 2007; Label: Agora SA; Formats: CD	—	POL: 30,000+	POL: Platinum
Starsi panowie (with Paweł Kukiz)	Released: May 10, 2010; Label: QM Music; Formats: CD	3	POL: 15,000+	POL: Gold
Mezalianse (with Justyna Steczkowska)	Released: February 21, 2011; Label: QM Music; Formats: CD, digital download	12		
"—" denotes a recording that did not chart or was not released in that territory.

=== Compilation albums ===
Title	Album details	Sales	Certifications
Złota kolekcja: Pan Maleńczuk	Released: November 13, 2006; Label: Pomaton EMI; Formats: CD	POL: 15,000+	POL: Gold

=== Live albums ===
Title	Album details	Peak chart positions	Sales	Certifications
Title	Album details	POL	Sales	Certifications
Psychodancing: Live	Released: June 28, 2010; Label: Warner Music Poland; Formats: CD, digital download	2	POL: 30,000+	POL: Platinum
"—" denotes a recording that did not chart or was not released in that territory.

== Poetry ==
- "Chamstwo w państwie", Kraków 2003, Wydawnictwo Literackie, ISBN 8308034713
