= Stefania Łukowicz-Mokwa =

Polish violinist (1892–1975)

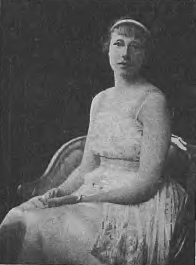
- Born: Stefania Katarzyna Łukowicz; 13 December 1892; Adelaide, Australia
- Died: 3 March 1975 (aged 82); Sopot, Poland
- Occupation: violinist

Stefania Katarzyna Łukowicz-Mokwa (13 December 1892 – 3 March 1975) was a Polish violinist, teacher of foreign languages, and wife of a Polish painter Marian Mokwa.

== Biography ==
Stefania Katarzyna Łukowicz was born on 13 December 1892 in Adelaide, Australia. Her father Count Marcel Łukowicz was a Polish doctor and lived in Australia since 1889, her mother Catharine Lacey was of Irish descent. In 1917, Łukowicz became a student of the Music Conservatory in Berlin and during next three years, she was performing as a violinist in Australia, India, and Europe.

On 11 July 1921, Łukowicz married a Polish painter Marian Mokwa in the church of Sea Stars in Sopot. In 1922, the couple settled in the villa “Adelaide” in Sopot that was the wedding gift from Łukowicz’s father. During the 1920s four children of Łukowicz and Mokwa were born: Edwin, Jan, Maria, and Stefania.

From 1925, Łukowicz-Mokwa was the first violinist of the symphony orchestra of the Polish Music Society in Gdańsk. From the 1930s to the beginning of the World War II, Łukowicz-Mokwa also as an English teacher at the Commercial Institute and at the Polish Commercial Schools of the Macierz Szkolna in Gdańsk.

In September 1939, Villa Adelaide where Łukowicz-Mokwa and her husband lived, was occupied by the Germans and they had to live in the basement of their house. In March 1945, the headquarters of the Red Army was located in the villa. Only after the end of the World War II, Łukowicz-Mokwa and her husband returned to the Adelaide Villa.

After the World War II, Łukowicz-Mokwa was a violinist at the Music and Dramatic Theater in Sopot. She gave many concerts organized as a charity events to help the poorest people.

Stefania Łukowicz-Mokwa died on 3 March 1975 in Sopot and was buried at the local Catholic Cemetery.
