= Shazza =

Polish singer and songwriter

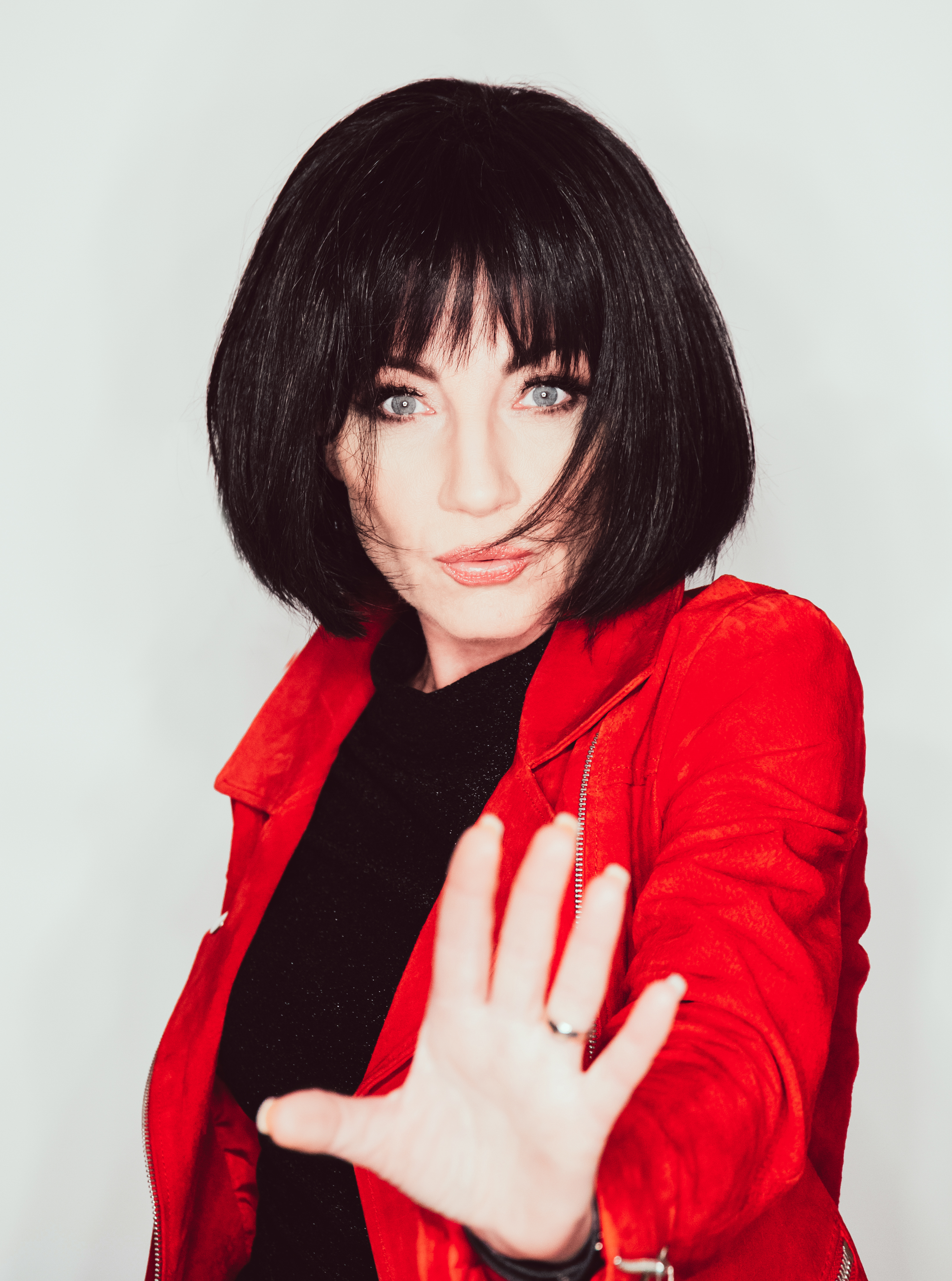

Background information
- Born: Magdalena Pańkowska; May 29, 1967 (age 59)
- Origin: Pruszków, Poland
- Genres: disco polo, Eurodance, pop, dance
- Occupation: singer-songwriter
- Years active: 1990s, 2000s
- Label: EMI

Shazza (born May 29, 1967, in Pruszków) is the stage name of Magdalena Pańkowska, a female Polish singer-songwriter and occasional actress. She found fame in the 1990s with her massive disco polo hits such as "Baiao Bongo", "Bierz co chcesz", "Egipskie noce" or "Noc róży". Having been proclaimed "the queen of disco polo", Shazza remains one of the best-selling singers of the genre.

== Career ==
Magdalena Pańkowska took the nickname Shazza, which she herself translates as “an unruly, love-struck priestess from the temple of Abu Simbel in Egypt". At the end of the 1980s she joined a disco polo group, Toy Boys, with whom she recorded first albums in the early 1990s. Her career as a solo artist began in 1992 with an album Sex Appeal. She enjoyed success with songs like "Jesteś moim ideałem" and "Jambalaya Mix". In 1994 Shazza had her first major hit with "Baiao Bongo", a cover version of an old 50s song originally performed by Caterina Valente. The album of the same name became a best-seller and the song "18 lat" also enjoyed popularity. Her videos were heavily aired in Disco Relax, a popular Sunday morning TV show.

The breakthrough in Shazza's career came in 1995. The song "Bierz co chcesz" became a massive hit and its music video is now considered cult. The track was included on her next album, Egipskie noce, which also included "Tak bardzo zakochani", "Miłość i zdrada" and popular title song. The album turned out her highest-selling record to date. It was followed by Noc róży in 1996, which presented more sophisticated sound. 1997 saw the release of Tak blisko nieba, her first album issued by a new record label. The biggest hit off the album was "Małe pieski dwa", and it also included a cover of ABBA's "Hasta Mañana". Her next album, Historia pewnej miłości, was another change of style and consisted of more dance-oriented songs. However, it didn't meet with such positive reception as her previous efforts had done.

In 1999 and 2000 Shazza released collections of her greatest hits. She also took part in a nude photo session for the Polish Playboy magazine. The issue with her on the cover turned out to be a big success.She also took part in a nude photo session for the Polish Playboy magazine. The issue with her on the cover turned out to be a big success.

After signing up to EMI record label, Shazza released her next album Jestem sobą in 2001. It was a clear departure from the disco polo sound with which she'd been associated. Singles "Jestem sobą" and "Może to samba" were minor hits, but the sales of the album proved disappointing and the singer was dropped by the label. After this Shazza decided to take a break from music. She moved to the US and made a modest comeback in 2007, when she re-recorded some of her most known hits.

== Discography ==
- 1992: Sex Appeal
- 1993: Jambalaya Mix
- 1994: Baiao Bongo
- 1994: The Best of Shazza
- 1995: Egipskie noce
- 1996: Noc róży
- 1996: Złote przeboje
- 1997: Tak blisko nieba
- 1998: Historia pewnej miłości
- 1999: Najlepsze z najlepszych. Przeboje 1993 – 1999
- 2000: Platynowe przeboje
- 2001: Jestem sobą
- 2006: The Best – Egipskie noce
- 2008: Hity Disco Polo cz. 3 – The Best of Shazza

== Acting ==
- 1996: Bara Bara
- 1999: Poniedziałek
- 2000: Sukces
- 2000: W tym domu straszy
- 2001: Wtorek
