= Lux Perpetua =

Polish power metal band

- Origin: Podkowa Leśna, Warsaw, Poland
- Genres: Power metal; heavy metal
- Years active: 2009–present
- Labels: Underground Symphony, Insignis Media
- Members: Artur Rosiński; Mateusz Uściłowski; Patryk Makać; Krzysztof Rutkowski; Paweł Zasadzki
- Past members: Marcin Rykiel; Emil Łazarski; Marcin Nieznański; Krystian Kowalski; Magdalena Tararuj; Tomasz Sałaciński

Lux Perpetua is a Polish power metal band founded in 2003 by Paweł Zasadzki, Tomasz Sałaciński, and Emil Łazarski.

== History ==
The band was founded in 2009 in Podkowa Leśna by Paweł Zasadzki. After recording some songs (including "The Legend" and "An Old Bard"), the band started playing their first shows. Lux Perpetua recorded their first EP, Forever We Stand, in Red Yeti Studio and released it in 2014. Marcin Rykiel and Emil Łazarski later left the band, and Artur Rosiński joined as their new vocalist. The group then began recording their debut album, The Curse of the Iron King, in HZ Studio near Warsaw.

In the meantime, the band signed an agreement with Insignis Publishing Company to perform a song and record a video for Robert J. Szmidt's book Wieża. The video and song ("Pociąg do Piekła Bram" - Polish version of the song "Straight back to hell") were released on YouTube in May 2016.

On February 28, 2017, the band released their debut album. In Poland itself, public interest grew within a few days after the release so much that even a TV station decided to send a film crew to their release show, which happened (due to other appointments) a few days after the official album release. A part of this show can still be seen on Telewizja Żyrardowska.

== Musicians ==
Current members

- Artur "RooZ" Rosiński - Vocals
- Paweł "Kaplic" Zasadzki - Percussion, Compositions
- Mateusz Uściłowski - Guitar
- Patryk Makać - Guitar
- Krzysztof "Kormak" Rutkowski - Bass

Former members

- Marcin "Martinez" Rykiel - Vocals (EP Forever We Stand - 2014)
- Emil "Kosa" Łazarski - Guitar
- Marcin "Draken" Nieznański - Bass
- Krystian Kowalski - Keyboards
- Magdalena "Meg" Tararuj - Keyboards
- Tomasz "Tommy" Sałaciński - Guitar

== Discography ==
Title	Album data
Forever We Stand	Publisher: own release; Year of publication: 2014
The Curse of the Iron King	Publisher: Underground Symphony; Release-date: 2017-02-28

== Video clips ==
Title	Year	Director	Album
"Pociąg do Piekła Bram"	2016-05-19	Insignis Media	Single
"Army of Salvation"	2016-09-21	Fractal Studios	Curse of the Iron King
"Curse of the Iron King"	2016-11-26	Own release	Curse of the Iron King
"Eversong"	2016-12-27	Own release	Curse of the Iron King

== Public appearances ==
Over the years Lux Perpetua performed several shows as supporting act for well-known Artists like Skiltron and Hunter as well as miscellaneous festivals like Folk Metal Crusade or Metal End of Summer. Further they played a show at a charity performance for battered animals.
