= Anna Cymmerman =

Polish operatic soprano

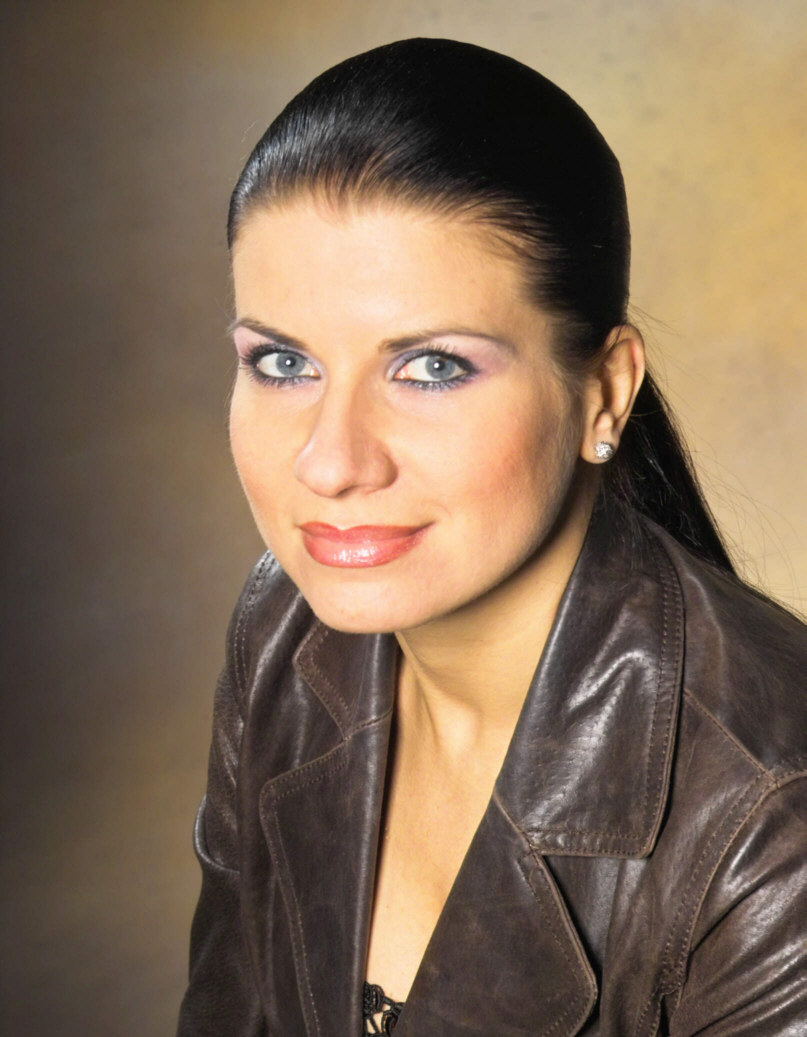
Anna Cymmerman

Anna Cymmerman is a Polish operatic soprano. She studied at the Academy of Music in Łódź where she majored in Vocal Acting and Performance and graduated with honors in June, 2000. While a student, she debuted as a soloist in the Grand Theatre, Łódź. There, she performed in Polish as Blanche in Poulenc's Dialogues of the Carmelites directed by Krzysztof Kelm. For this role, she was judged the best opera debut of the 1999/2000 season. She has since performed in opera productions in Austria, Denmark, Holland, and Germany. Her performance in Karol Szymanowski's Stabat Mater at Chicago's International Music Theater was considered a great success. She sang in a concert organized by the Polish embassy at the 2008 Summer Olympics in Beijing for more than 1000 IOC representatives.

Cymmerman's repertoire of leading roles includes Elvira in Verdi's Ernani; Corinna in Rossini's Il viaggio a Reims; Neddy in Leoncavallo's Pagliacci; Marguerite in Gounod's Faust; the title role of Cilea's Adriana Lecouvreur (Grand Theatre); the Countess in Mozart's The Marriage of Figaro and the title role in Stanisław Moniuszko's The Countess. In the lighter repertoire, her roles include Sylva in Kálmán's Die Csárdásfürstin, Hanna Glawari in Lehár's The Merry Widow, Rosalinde in Strauss' Die Fledermaus, the Widow in Kander's Zorba, and Clara in Gershwin's Porgy and Bess.
