= Leszek Malinowski =

Polish cabaret artist, actor and scenarist

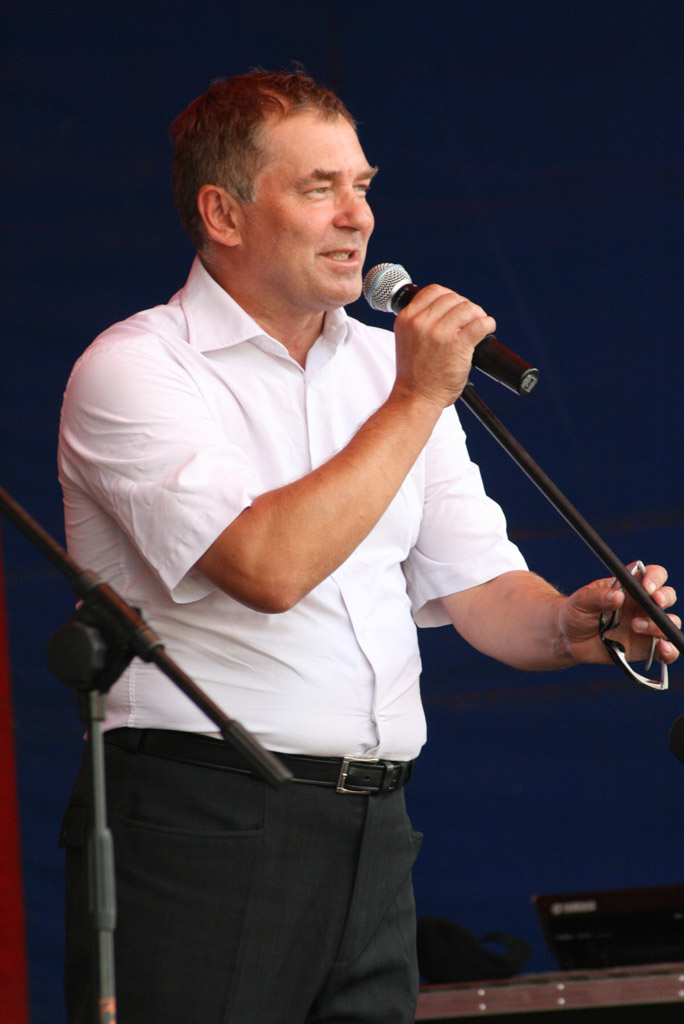
- Leszek Malinowski in Goleniów (2007)
- Born: 31 May 1959 (age 66); Koszalin, Poland

Leszek Malinowski (born 31 May 1959 in Koszalin) is a Polish cabaret artist, actor and scenarist. He is member of cabaret Koń Polski.

He was a director or Radio Północ.

== Filmography ==
- 1999: Badziewiakowie
- 2000: Skarb sekretarza
- 2002: Jest sprawa...
- 2004: Polskie miłości
- 2004: Cudownie ocalony
