= Śmierć Kliniczna =

Polish punk rock band

Śmierć Kliniczna (Polish for clinical death) was a Polish punk rock band, founded in Gliwice in 1981 by Dariusz Dusza (guitar), Wojciech Jaczyczko (bass guitar), Marek Czapelski (drums) and Jerzy Mercik (vocal). Along with Dezerter, KSU and Brygada Kryzys, Smierc Kliniczna was one of the most popular early punk rock bands in Poland. It played at the 1982 Jarocin Festival, and next year, with a second vocalist, Jacek Szafir, the band played several concerts, among others at the Opole Festival, Jarocin Festival, Rockowisko in Lodz and FAMA Festival in Swinoujscie. After the 1984 Jarocin Festival, Smierc Kliniczna was disbanded; Dariusz Dusza founded punk-rock band Absurd and the remaining musicians founded Reggae Against Politics (better known as R.A.P.), a reggae band, very popular in Poland in mid-1980s.

== Line-up ==
- Jerzy Mercik - Vocals
- Jacek Szafir - Vocals
- Dariusz Dusza - Guitar
- Wojciech Jaczyczko - Bass
- Marek Czapelski - Percussions
- Piotr Malak - Saxophone
- Mateusz Pospieszalski - Saxophone
- Ziut Gralak - Trumpet

== Discography ==
- Nasza Edukacja / Nienormalny Swiat 7" (Tonpress Records) 1983
- ASP / Jestem Ziarnkiem Piasku 7" (Tonpress Records) 1984
- 1982-1984 CD (Jimmy Jazz Records) 2001
