= Janusz Frychel =

Polish musician and bassist

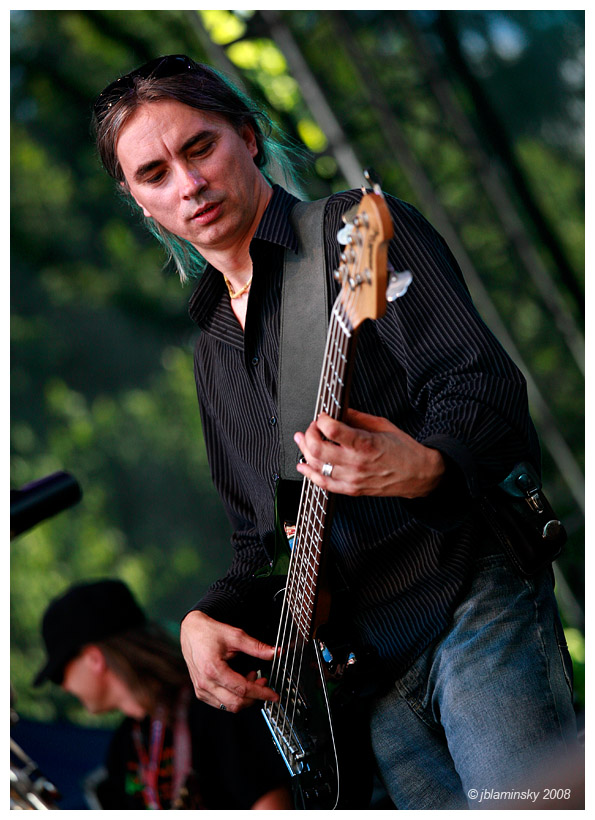

Background information
- Born: January 7, 1967 (age 58); Ruda Śląska, Poland
- Genres: Blues; Rock; Pop; Folk
- Occupation(s): bass guitarist, composer, lyricist
- Instrument(s): bass guitar, double bass
- Years active: 1985-
- Member of: Gang Olsena
- Formerly of: Pilar, Acoustic Travel Band, Kid Brown, Good Company
- Website: https://frychel.pl

Janusz Frychel (born January 7, 1967) is a Polish musician, bassist, composer, and lyricist. His music combines styles such as blues, rock, pop, and folk. He is one of the founders of the band Gang Olsena. Since 1988, he has been performing on major stages and festivals in Poland and abroad.

== Musical biography ==
In 1986, he formed his first band, Lean Back, together with Ireneusz Kucharczyk, Zbigniew Szczerbiński, and Tomasz Kupka. The group performed, among others, at Spodek in Katowice as the winner of the Rawa Blues Festival eliminations and at the Silesian Jazz Festival.

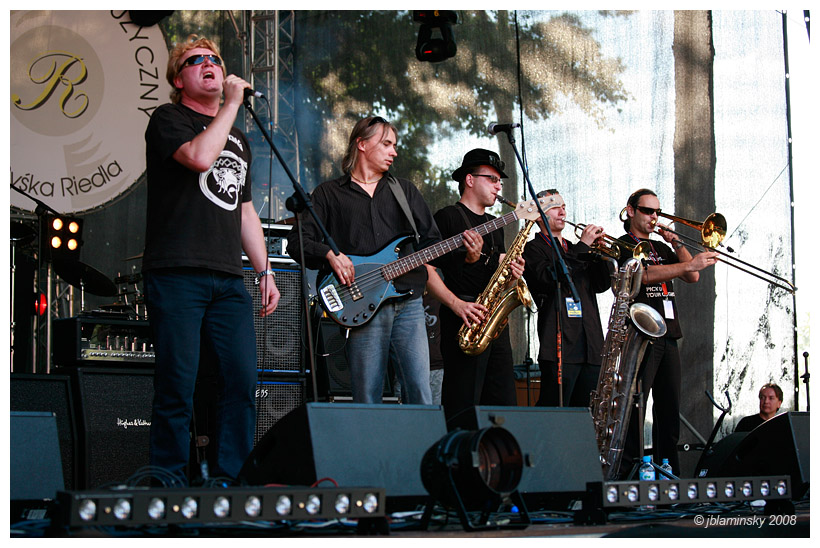
Janusz Frychel with the Gang Olsena band.

In 1988, Janusz Frychel co-founded the band Gang Olsena, which has been named as one of Poland's top Rhythm & Blues groups. He is currently an active member of Gang Olsena, and in addition to playing bass, he writes music and lyrics for the band. He has performed at festivals such as National Festival of Polish Song in Opole, FAMA in Świnoujście, Rawa Blues at Spodek in Katowice, Country Picnic in Mrągowo, the Jarocin Festival, and the Woodstock Festival Poland organized by Jurek Owsiak. The band celebrated its 30th anniversary with a jubilee concert at the Radio Katowice Hall in 2019. Janusz Frychel has recorded six albums with Gang Olsena. The song Białe Myszy, Dzikie Koty from the album GO! was featured in the Anthology of Polish Blues released in 2008 under the patronage of Polish Radio Three and in the second edition of the Polish Top All-Time Hits Anthology published by Polish Radio in 2011.

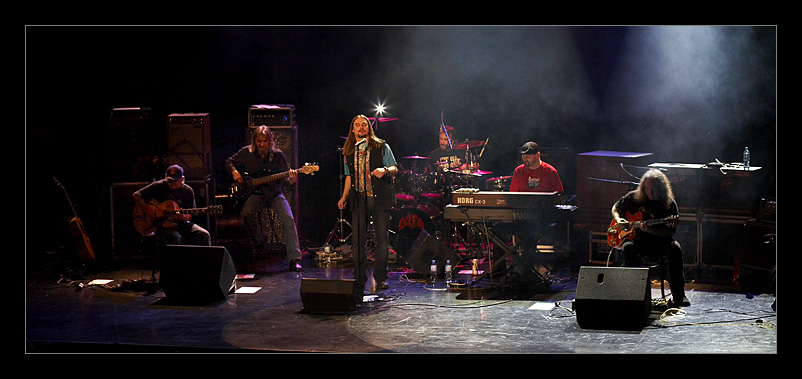
Janusz Frychel with the Dżem band.

Throughout his career, Janusz Frychel has collaborated among others with composer Katarzyna Gärtner and notable Polish artists such as Krzysztof Krawczyk, Karin Stanek, and Wojciech Korda. He also worked on a musical project with actress and singer Agnieszka Babicz dedicated to the works of Anna German. Additionally, he has performed and recorded with groups such as Acoustic Travel Band, Pilár, Kid Brown, and Good Company.

Since 2008, Janusz Frychel has been collaborating with the band Dżem. He has participated in numerous tours across Poland and Europe, stepping in for bassist Beno Otręba.

== Discography ==
Janusz Frychel has appeared on the following albums

- GO! - Gang Olsena (1992)
- Dzika Wolność - Gang Olsena (1994)
- Przystanek Woodstock '96 (1997)
- Raycowny Rhythm & Blues - Gang Olsena (2000)
- Czar Korzeni - Katarzyna Gärtner (2000)
- Disco & Blues - Gang Olsena (2004)
- Live - Gang Olsena (2006)
- Nowy Dzień – Kid Brown (2008)
- Pozytywizm – Kid Brown (2009)
- Twarze – Ludwik Konopko (2010)
- Nasze Poddasze – Pilár (2014)
- Tak myślę sobie – Teren C (2017)
- Słone Piosenki – Joanna Cieśniewska (2018)
- Rock Nie Na Plaży – guest appearance with Dżem (2021)
- 30 Lat Na Scenie – Live in Radio Katowice - Gang Olsena (2021)
