= Vavamuffin =

Polish band

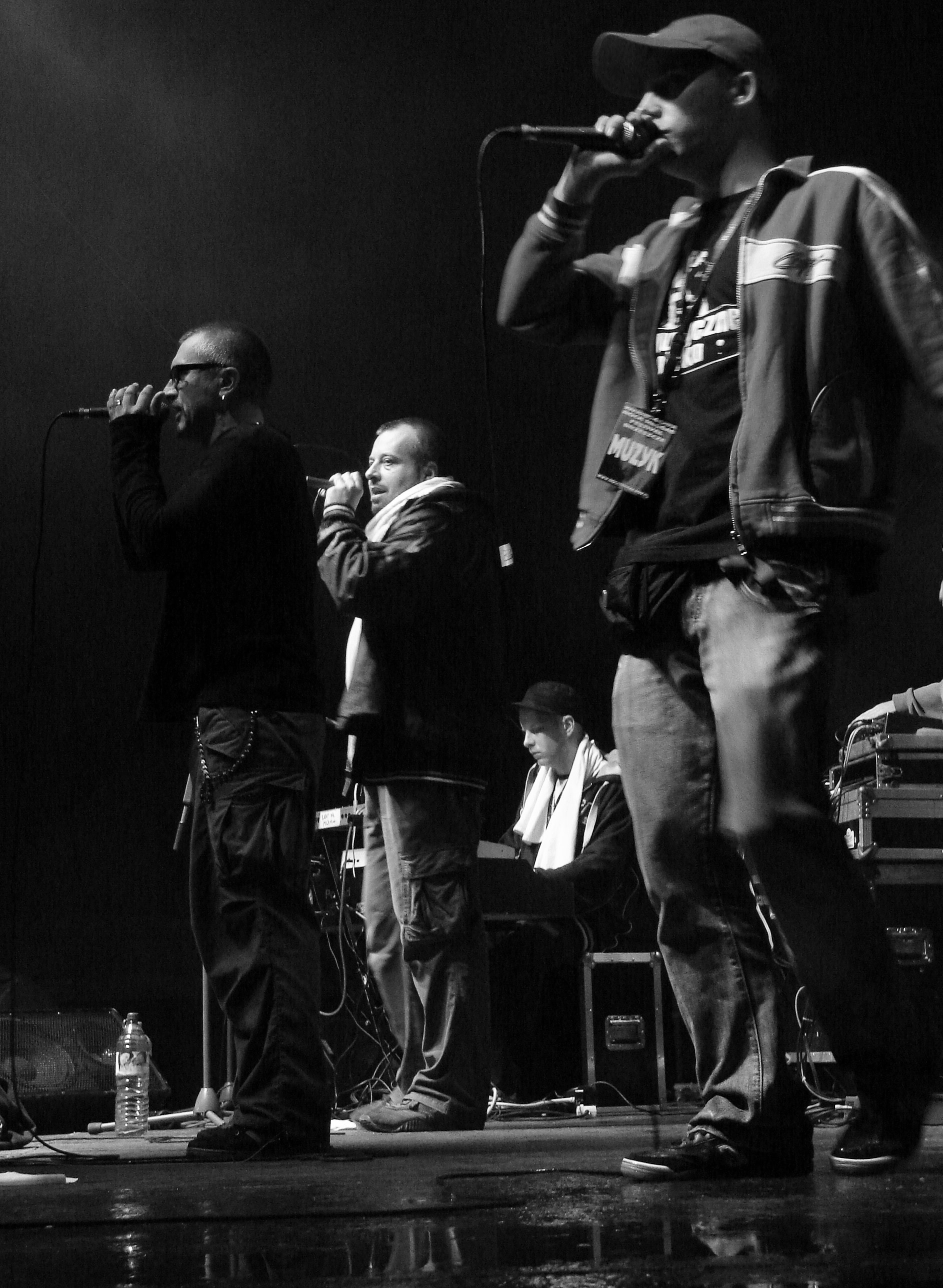
- Vavamuffin in Brzeszcze, Poland

Background information
- Origin: Warsaw, Poland
- Genres: Raggamuffin, roots reggae, dancehall
- Years active: 2003–present
- Label: Karrot Kommando
- Members: Pablopavo; Reggaenerator; Gorg; Emili Jones; Jahcob Junior; Raffi Kazan; Mothashipp; Dubbist; Barton

Vavamuffin is a Polish raggamuffin, roots reggae and dancehall band from Warsaw. They were formed in 2003 and have released five albums under the label Karrot Kommando. The band members are Pablopavo, Reggaenerator, Gorg, Emili Jones, Jahcob Junior, Raffi Kazan, Mothashipp, Dubbist and Barton. They have participated in Przystanek Woodstock.

== Discography ==
=== Albums ===
Title	Album details	Peak chart positions
Title	Album details	POL
Vabang!	Released: April 25, 2005; Label: Karrot Kommando; Formats: CD, LP, digital download	—
Dubang!	Released: November 9, 2006; Label: Karrot Kommando; Formats: CD	—
Inadibusu	Released: November 19, 2007; Label: Karrot Kommando; Formats: CD, digital download	29
Mo' Better Rootz	Released: April 16, 2010; Label: Karrot Kommando; Formats: CD, digital download	7
Solresol	Released: April 8, 2013; Label: Karrot Kommando; Formats: CD, digital download	17
"—" denotes a recording that did not chart or was not released in that territory.

=== Video albums ===
Title	Video details
Przystanek Woodstock	Released: December 17, 2007; Label: Złoty Melon; Formats: DVD
