= Homo Twist =

Polish rock band

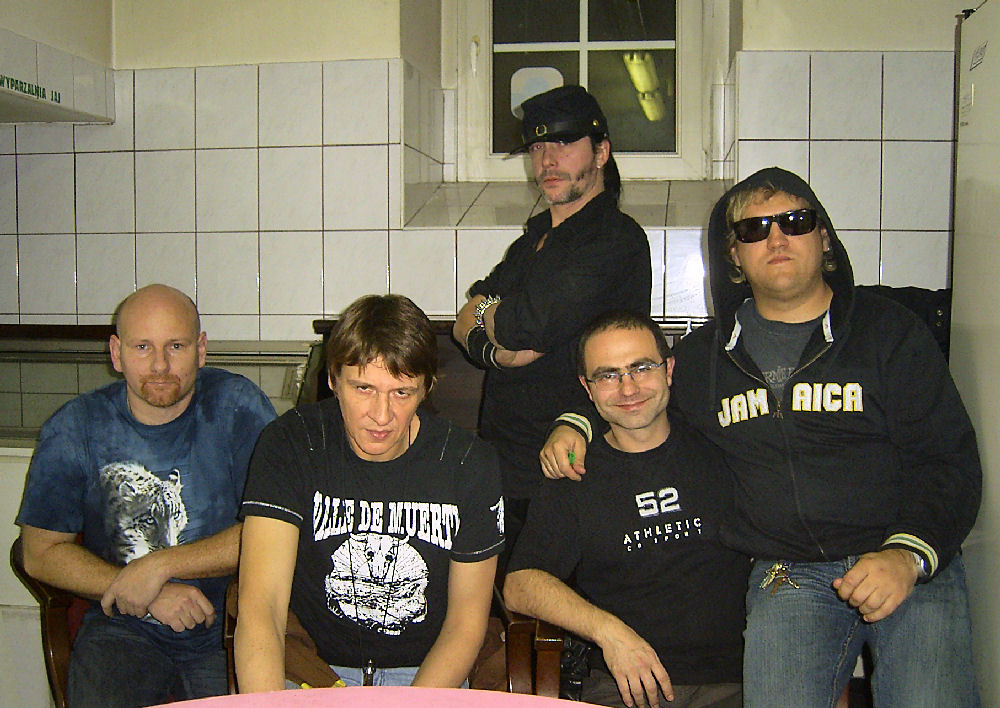
- Homo Twist in 2005

Background information
- Origin: Poland
- Genres: Rock, alternative rock
- Years active: 1993–2000, 2004–2009
- Members: Maciej Maleńczuk - vocals, guitar Olaf Deriglasoff - bass Tomasz Dominik - drums Piotr "Lala" Lewicki - keyboards
- Past members: Leszek Kowal - bass Tomasz "Titus" Pukacki - bass Grzegorz Schneider - drums Franz Dreadhunter - bass Artur Hajdasz - drums
- Website: http://www.homotwist.art.pl

Homo Twist was a Polish rock band founded in 1993 by Maciej Maleńczuk. Their name means human dance with Homo being derived from the Latin word for human.

== Discography ==
Title	Album details	Peak chart positions
Title	Album details	POL
Cały ten seks	Released: 11 April 1994; Label: Music Corner Records	—
Homo Twist	Released: 18 March 1996; Label: Music Corner Records	—
Moniti Revan	Released: 14 July 1997; Label: Music Corner Records	—
Live After Death	Released: 28 January 2002; Label: Music Corner Records	—
Demonologic	Released: 31 October 2005; Label: Metal Mind Productions	21
Matematyk	Released: 24 March 2008; Label: Pomaton EMI	11
"—" denotes a recording that did not chart or was not released in that territory.
