= Cold Therapy =

Polish electronic music project

- Origin: Poland
- Genres: Industrial, EBM, dark electro, darkwave, electronica, experimental
- Years active: 2012–present
- Label: Advoxya Records
- Members: Jacek Wolański
- Website: www.coldtherapy-official.com

Cold Therapy is a dark-industrial/dark electronic music project from Poland, founded by Jacek Wolański on October 8, 2012. Music of Cold Therapy is known for its dark and atmospheric sound.

== History ==
Wolański began releasing music in 2009, releasing several albums with two different bands before founding Cold Therapy.

At first, he started making Dark Ambient music (never officially released) with his two-man group Unsinn, where he was the composer and vocalist. Finally, they ended up making Aggrotech / EBM music and released one official album in 2010. Shortly after that, his work on Unsinn ended in a controversial manner: "[H]e removed me from the band, took all rights, without mentioning about it. He said and wrote everywhere that I left the band by myself. And that was the end of our cooperation."

The second band in which Wolański was involved was Traumatize. Another Aggrotech / EBM project, which concentrated more on making music suitable for dancefloors and DJ sets. As Traumatize, from 2010 to the end of 2012 he released 3 full albums, 1 EP and 1 single, mostly with the Spanish record label Mutant-E Records.

After few years of album releases, Wolański felt tired of the aggressive, club-oriented style of music and in need of a change, founded Cold Therapy. This was the moment he decided to make more old-school Dark Electronic music.

He stated in an interview: "This time I wanted to make something different, something more 'personal', more into my own musical tastes, to express myself."

After the first album Embrace the Silence, the band was joined by a new main vocalist, Jan R., and female secondary vocalist Jen. They then released the EP Carnival of Lies and the full album Masquerade Infinite. But on March 10, 2016, both left Cold Therapy and Wolański returned to working solo. On November 14, 2016, he released another full-length album, Figures and Faces.

Masquerade Infinite is currently the most successful release of Cold Therapy has received many positive reviews, for example from Side-Line Magazine, which stated: "Cold Therapy clearly strives to compose a personal sound. The haunting atmospheres hanging over the songs is poignant and definitely the main force and characteristic of this work" and Brutal Resonance: "Here, Cold Therapy have created a sound that spans across quite a few eras of electro-industrial evolution."

Masquerade Infinite reached 4th position on the German Electronic Charts (GEWC) and entered the TOP 50 Bestsellers ranking on POPoNAUT, being in 43rd place.

Cold Therapy appeared on various compilations and is well known for collaborations and remixes done for other artists, such as Suicide Commando, Wumpscut, Acylum, Shiv-r, A7ie, Die Braut, nolongerhuman, and Hydroxie.

== Record label ==
Cold Therapy has been signed to Advoxya Records since March 22, 2015.

== Discography ==
=== Albums ===
- 2013 - Embrace the Silence
- 2015 - Masquerade Infinite
- 2016 - Figures and Faces
- 2018 - The Darkest Hour

=== EP ===
- 2014- Carnival of Lies

=== Side release series ===
- 2017 - Behind the Scenes: Vol. 01

== Remix appearances ==
=== 2012 ===
- Terrortek X - Bio Chemical Warfare

=== 2013 ===
- nolongerhuman - Introvert
- Nano Infect - Scars Of Denial
- Aggroaphobia - Obsessive Mind
- RSM - Roznieś Swoje Mocarstwo
- Corroded Master - Wir Sind Viele
- Projekt LR - God Bless All Murderers
- Subliminal Noize - Happy End Of The World
- At0shima 3rr0r - Beyond the horizon

=== 2014 ===
- Wumpscut - Bulwark Bazooka
- A7ie - Distress V2.0 (digital / exclusive edition)
- Die Braut - Parricida Perpetuo
- Advent Resilience - Atavism
- Proyecto Crisis - Under Control
- impurfekt - repurfekt II
- Obsidian FX - Phlegm
- Hasswut - Wir sind...
- Reactor7x - Sick of it all
- AudioCentesis - Zughenruhe
- VA - CRL Studios Presents: The Fourth Wavelength (Lost) – remix for Biomechanimal
- At0shima 3rr0r - Silent One

=== 2015 ===
- Wumpscut - Blutspuker Tavern
- Acylum - Zigeunerjunge
- Acylum - Venom
- Shiv-r - Eye of the Needle
- Hydroxie - Seelenschmerz
- Studio-X vs Simon Carter - Ad Astra Volantis
- reADJUST - Kontrollverlust
- Viscera Drip - Perpetual Adversity + Remixes (2CD edition)
- Device Noize - Tabues Remixed
- lucidstatic - You Are Here
- Uncarnate - Weak protein life
- F.T.C. - I'm Not Crazy
- The Dark Butterfly - Alles oder Nichts
- BlutKraft - Leave the Dancefloor

=== 2016 ===
- A7ie - Narcissick Volume II
- Homicidal Feelings - Cognitive Disorders
- Subliminal Code - Soldier Of Hell, Reborn
- Promidal - Simul iustus et peccator : : THE REMIXES : :
- Binary Division - Defcon 1

=== 2017 ===
- Suicide Commando - Forest Of The Impaled (Limited Edition)
- Vore Complex - Hate Tusk
- Antibody - Opera Of Death
- WANT/ed & Miranda Cartel - My Pride
- Electro Fear - The Little Shop Of Horrors
- Taxon Lazare - Chinatown / Чайнатаун

=== 2018 ===
- Benjamin'sPlague - Perfectly Hideous
- Vore Complex - Mewl

== Guest appearances ==
=== 2013 ===
- Vault-113 - Cold Fusion
- FF.AA - Reorganización Nacional
- FF.AA - Mission Failed
- A.D.N - Salvation of God
- A.D.N - The Singularity (B-sides)
- A.D.N - My end (B-sides remix)
- A.D.N - All die Bastards
- VA - Tactical Tracks 2nd Assault – song: 13th Angel - Purgatory (feat. Cold Therapy)

=== 2014 ===
- Universally Unnecessary - The Uprising

=== 2015 ===
- VA - Side-Line - Face The Beat: Session 2 – song: Traumatize - Bound by Hell (feat. Cold Therapy)
- VA - Elektro Villain: Volume 005 – song: Traumatize - Bound by Hell (feat. Cold Therapy)
- Acervus - Something Beautiful
- VA - Mechanized - Best Of 2015 – song: A.[D].N - Was Pain (Feat Cold Therapy)
- London Sadness - Confession
- VA - Halotan Records -Sampler 08 – song: 13th Angel - Purgatory (feat. Cold Therapy)

=== 2016 ===
- VA - Seasons of Electronics Vol. I – song: Traumatize - Bound by Hell (feat. Cold Therapy)

=== 2017 ===
- Fredrik Croona - This Is Goodbye
- VA - darkTunes - Gothic Music Orgy Vol.4 – song: Plague Doctor - I'm coming to take you away (feat. Cold Therapy)
- VA - Elektro Villain: Volume 007 – song: Plague Doctor - I'm coming to take you away (feat. Cold Therapy)
- VA - Brutal Resonance - It's September – song: Acervus - Far, Far Away (feat. Cold Therapy)

=== 2019 ===
- Plague Doctor - Reborn

== Compilation appearances ==
=== 2012 ===
- Digital Recovery: Part 1
- Tactical Beats (Winter Ops)
- Freak Machine 0.2

=== 2013 ===
- Infraschall Vol.5
- Halotan Records - Sampler 05
- Halotan Records - Sampler 06
- Halotan Records - Sampler 07
- Tactical Tracks 2nd Assault
- EBM ADDICTION 10,000 Vol. II
- EBM ADDICTION [VOL 3]
- Dance 4 Syria - Vol.2 - Industrial

=== 2014 ===
- Beat:Cancer V2
- Digital Recovery: Part 10.4
- DJ Led Manville - Nachtplan Tanz Vol.17
- CRL Studios Presents: While You Were Out Vol. 2
- CRL Studios Presents: Power Beyond Fathom (A Benefit For Don Hill Of Millipede) Part 3
- Elektro Villain: Volume 002
- NAR Goth`N`Tronic Sampler Vol.3

=== 2015 ===
- Side-Line - Face The Beat: Session 2
- Digital Recovery: Part 11.2
- Project Industrial: Underground Machines
- Freak Machine 0.3
- Halotan Records - Sampler 08
- Halotan Records - Halotan Sounds 2.0
- Elektro Villain: Volume 005
- Freak Machine 0.4
- Mechanized - Best Of 2015

=== 2016 ===
- Side-Line - Face The Beat: Session 4
- Side-Line - Face The Beat: Session 3
- darkTunes - Gothic Music Orgy Vol.3
- darkTunes - Gothic Music Orgy Vol.2
- Body Virus
- Intravenous Magazine - Blood Pack Vol. 3
- Seasons of Electronics Vol. I
- CIA Volume 2

=== 2017 ===
- darkTunes - Gothic Music Orgy Vol.4
- Freak Machine 0.5
- Brutal Resonance - It's September
- Brutal Resonance - June 2017
- Elektro Villain: Volume 007

=== 2018 ===
- Insane Records - Terror Night Vol.4 Digital Prophecy For Cyber Harvest
- Brutal Resonance - We Love Industrial
- Intravenous Magazine - Blood Pack Vol. 5
- Dark Electro Polska Vol. 1
- Brutal Resonance - There's a Lot of Industrial on This Compilation
- Russian Dark Community - Compilation vol . 1
- Russian Dark Community - Digital Virus
- Brutal Resonance - Happy Goffmas

=== 2019 ===
- Alfa Matrix - Endzeit Bunkertracks [act 8] - the bonus tracks
