= Pablopavo =

Polish vocalist, songwriter, and DJ

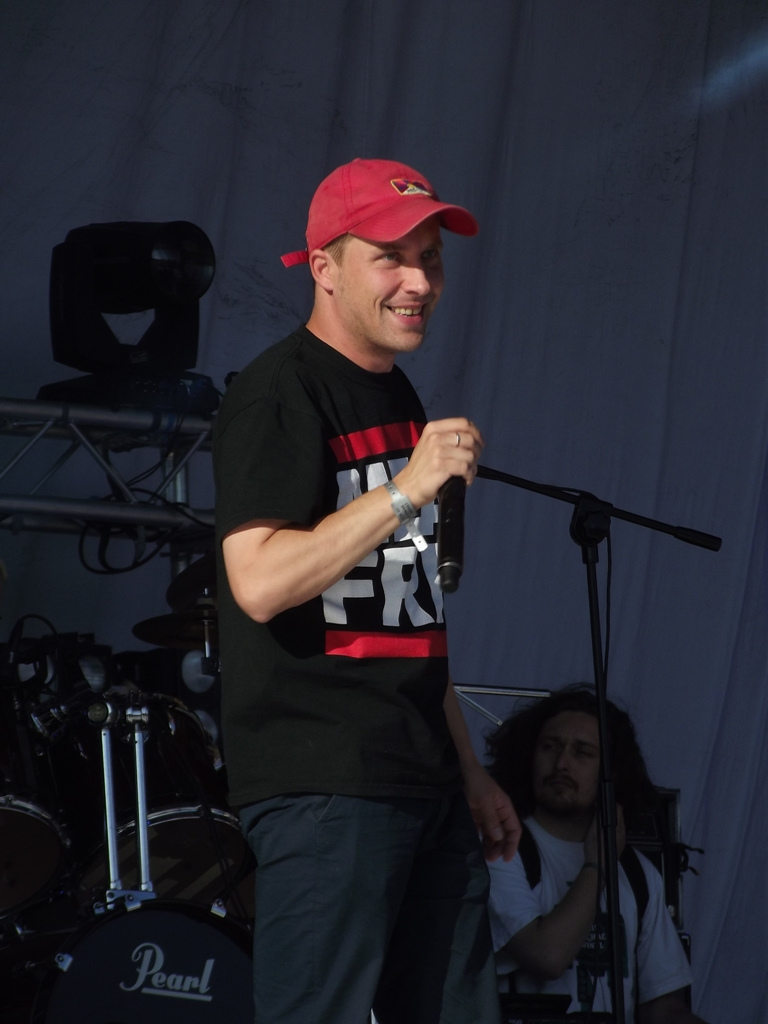
- Pablopavo in Cracow, 2011

Background information
- Born: Paweł Sołtys; 30 March 1978 (age 47); Warsaw, Poland
- Genres: Reggae, raggamuffin
- Occupations: Singer, songwriter, radio DJ
- Years active: 2000–present
- Labels: Karrot Kommando
- Member of: Vavamuffin
- Website: pablopavo.pl

Pablopavo (born 30 March 1978 as Paweł Sołtys) is a Polish reggae and raggamuffin vocalist, songwriter, and radio DJ. He has a radio show on Roxy FM called Tramwaj z Pragi. Pablopavo is the lead singer of Warsaw-based reggae band Vavamuffin. He has also recorded with a side-project called Pablopavo i Ludziki. He is one of the first vocalists singing raggamuffin in Polish and specializes in long and complicated freestyle vocal parts.

== History ==
Pablopavo started his career in 2000 as the vocalist and guitarist of the band Saduba, and in 2001 of the band Magara. In 2002 he founded, together with Reggaenerator and Krzak, Zjednoczenie Sound System, which promotes Jamaican sound system music. Since 2003, he is the lead singer of popular Polish reggae band Vavamuffin, which has released five studio albums to date.

His other projects include Ba-Lan Soundsystem and the band Sedativa (since 2006). He has recorded with artists such as Fu (Olsen/Fu, Zipera, ZIP Skład), Hemp Gru, O.S.T.R., Sidney Polak, Sedativa, Dreadsquad, Magiera, James Ashen, Habakuk, Junior Stress, Maleo Reggae Rockers, and Molesta Ewenement.

=== Pablopavo i Ludziki, Głodne kawałki (2008-present) ===
Apart from singing in Vavamuffin and various sound systems, Pablopavo started a solo career. His debut single Zykamu/Dola Selektora was released in 2008 on 7" vinyl and was initially intended to promote Pablopavo's debut album. However, as the release of the album was delayed, Zykamu/Dola Selektora was left as a stand-alone single.

Pablopavo's debut studio album Telehon, signed Pablopavo i Ludziki, was released on 26 September 2009 through Karrot Kommando label, which specializes in reggae music. The album was promoted by the single "Telehon".

On 30 March 2011, the second Pablopavo i Ludziki album, titled 10 piosenek, was released through Karrot Kommando.

Pablopavo's third album, Głodne kawałki, was recorded together with music producer Rafał "Praczas" Kołaciński. It was released on 28 November 2011.

At the beginning of 2013, a song titled "Koty" was released as the first single from Pablopavo's upcoming album.

== Discography ==
Title	Album details	Peak chart positions
Title	Album details	POL
Telehon	As Pablopavo i Ludziki; Released: 26 September 2009; Label: Karrot Kommando/Fonografika	—
10 piosenek	As Pablopavo i Ludziki; Released: 30 March 2011; Label: Karrot Kommando/Fonografika	28
Głodne kawałki	With Praczas; Released: 25 November 2011; Label: Karrot Kommando/Rockers Publishing	—
Polor	As Pablopavo i Ludziki; Released: 24 January 2014; Label: Karrot Kommando/Fonografika	15
Tylko	As Pablopavo; Released: 24 October 2014; Label: Karrot Kommando/ Fonografika	—
"—" denotes a release that did not chart.

== Music videos ==
Year	Song	Director(s)	Album	Source
2009	Pablopavo i Ludziki - "Dym Dym"	Łukasz Rusinek	Telehon	
2010	Pablopavo i Ludziki - "Do stu"	Barton	Telehon	
2011	Pablopavo i Ludziki - "Indziej"	Alexandra Kutz	10 piosenek	
2011	Pablopavo i Ludziki - "10 piosenek"	Maciej Walentowski	10 piosenek	
2012	Pablopavo & Praczas - "Stówa" (feat. Spięty/Lao Che)	4zero4	Głodne kawałki	
2013	Pablopavo i Ludziki - "Dancingowa Piosenka Miłosna"	Radosław Chrześciański	Polor	

== Awards and nominations ==
=== Superjedynki ===
Year	Nominee / work	Award	Result
2010	Telehon	Hip-hop Album	Nominated
2010	Telehon	Debut Album	Nominated
