= Sebastian Niedziela =

Polish composer

Sebastian Niedziela (born 1975) is a Polish contemporary classical composer, graduated with honors from The Karol Szymanowski Academy of Music in Katowice, Poland.

He first became famous in Europe in 1998, when he was awarded the Assembly of European Regions Award in the 1st European Union Young Composers Contest held in Strasbourg by the Cercle d'Orchestre. The Jury consisted of more than twenty famous composers representing all European countries, and included Sophia Gubaidulina and Mauricio Kagel.

The awarded symphonic poem is entitled "Sur l'Esperance". He received official congratulations from the Polish Minister of Foreign Affairs Bronisław Geremek, and from other members of Polish authorities. He was in the news on every Polish TV channel, some (TVN) broadcasting live from his home. He was not only on the first pages of Rzeczpospolita and Dziennik Polski, but also featured in popular magazines like Elle, that rarely (if ever) cover contemporary classical music. The awarded composition, which in its original form is a concerto for electric guitar, was scheduled to be performed in Strasbourg and in Polish cities by one of renowned guitar virtuosos. Steve Vai, Yngwie Malmsteen and John Petrucci were contacted by organizers of the contest. Because of unknown matters, the premiere performance has been postponed indefinitely.

He worked with Polish Idol finalists, including the first season winner, a World Idol competitor, Alicja Janosz. In the second season of Polish Idol he participated as a vocalist, but was rejected by the jury in the first round.

He is also an accomplished rock guitar player (in 1994 recorded a TV program about virtuoso techniques for TVP), and is a mixing engineer.

He is also the first Polish translator of Baguazhang gongfu instructional materials. He translated for YMAAPublications, Boston - "Emei Baguazhang" by Liang Shou-Yu, and six other items released by the YMAA publishing house.

== Selected works ==
- "String Quintet" for the string orchestra
- "The Virtuoso String Quartet"
- "Say" for the SO
- "Sur l'Esperance" for the SO (a concerto for electric guitar)
- "Missa Brevis" for a chamber choir
- "Anhelli" - music for a TV spectacle directed by Grzegorz Królikiewicz
