= Brathanki =

Polish folk rock band

BRAThANKI
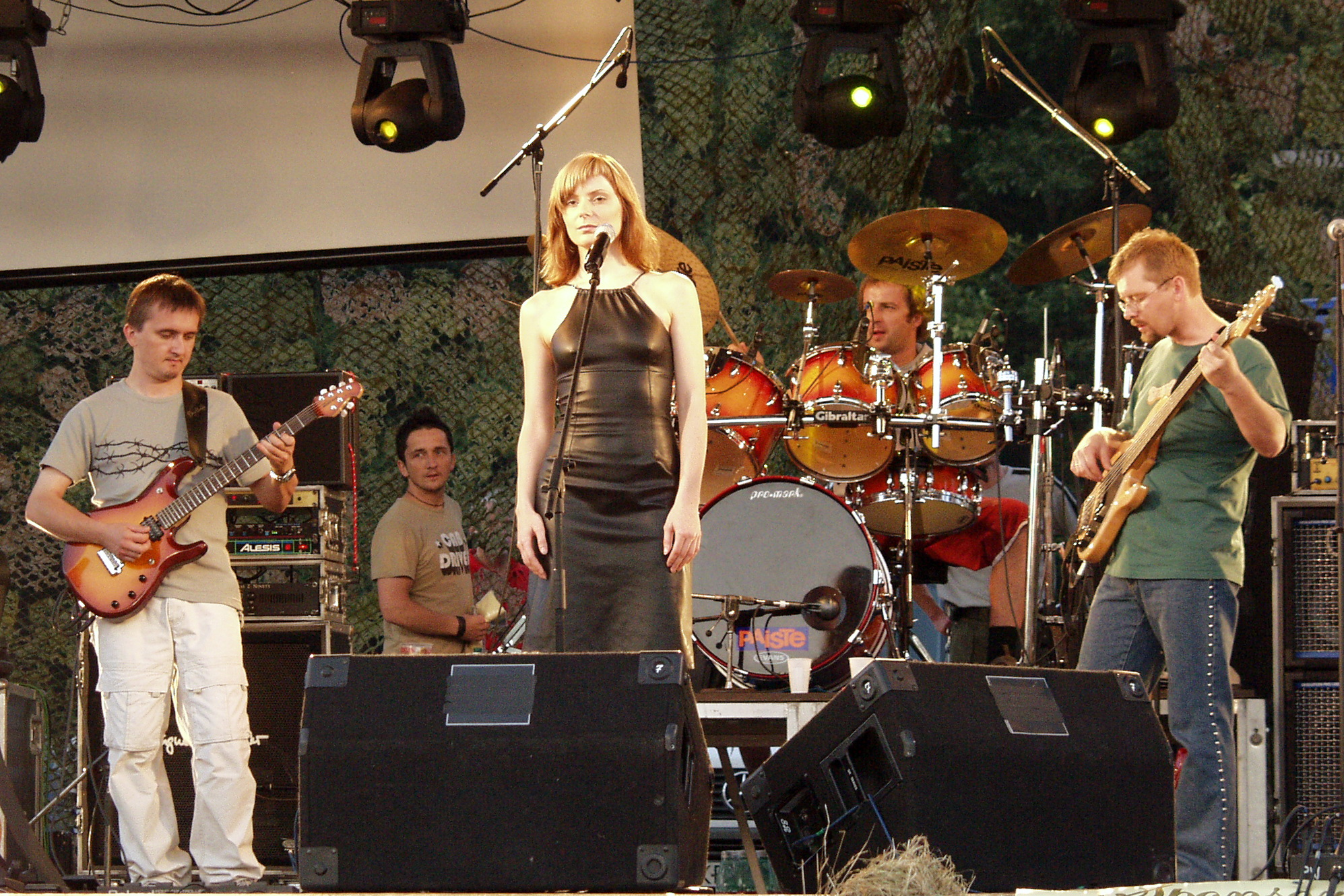
- BRAThANKI in 2002

Background information
- Origin: Kraków, Poland
- Genres: folk rock
- Years active: 1998–present
- Labels: Sony Music Entertainment Poland, QM Music
- Members: Agnieszka Dyk; Janusz Mus; Adam Prucnal; Grzegorz Piętak; Wiktor Tatarek; Piotr Królik; Stefan Błaszczyński
- Past members: Hania Chowaniec-Rybka; Halina Mlynkova; Ania Mikos; Magdalena Rzemek; Ola Chodak; Jacek Królik

BRAThANKI is a Polish folk rock group. They combine Polish, Hungarian and Czech folk elements with rock music.

== Discography ==
Title	Album details	Peak chart positions	Sales	Certifications
Title	Album details	POL	Sales	Certifications
Ano!	Released: April 3, 2000; Label: Sony; Formats: CD, digital download	5	POL: 400,000+	POL: 4× Platinum
Patataj	Released: June 11, 2001; Label: Sony; Formats: CD	3	POL: 100,000+	POL: Platinum
Galoop	Released: November 3, 2003; Label: Sony; Formats: CD	39		
Gwiazdy XX wieku	Released: August 16, 2007; Label: Sony; Formats: CD, digital download	—		
Brathanki grają Skaldów	Released: July 15, 2011; Label: QM Music; Formats: CD, digital download	—		
moMtyle	Released: June 9, 2014; Label: Polskie Radio; Formats: CD, digital download	—		
"—" denotes a recording that did not chart or was not released in that territory.
