= Buk - akustycznie =

Studio album by Kat & Roman Kostrzewski
- Released: 8 September 2014
- Genre: Thrash metal
- Length: 60:15
- Language: Polish
- Label: Mystic Production

Kat & Roman Kostrzewski chronology
Biało-czarna (2011)	Buk - akustycznie (2014)	666 (2015)

Buk - akustycznie (Beech - acoustic) is the second album by Polish thrash metal band Kat & Roman Kostrzewski, released on 8 September 2014 by the label Mystic Production. It consists of acoustic re-recordings of material previously released by Kat and by Kat & Roman Kostrzewski on their previous album. It peaked at 7th place on the Polish Official Sales Chart.

== Track listing ==
No.	Title	Length
1.	"Czas Zemsty"	6:10
2.	"Śpisz jak kamień"	4:29
3.	"Łza dla cieniów minionych"	5:12
4.	"Odi Profanum Vulgus"	5:19
5.	"Spojrzenie" (instrumental)	2:11
6.	"Diabelski dom cz. I"	5:10
7.	"Głos z ciemności"	5:55
8.	"Robak"	4:31
9.	"Szkarłatny wir"	6:56
10.	"Wolni od klęczenia"	3:49
11.	"Łoże wspólne lecz przytulne"	5:00
12.	"Trzeba zasnąć"	5:33
Total length:		1:00:15

Note: Tracks 1 and 6 originally appear on 666.
Tracks 2 and 7 originally appear on Oddech wymarłych światów.
Track 3 originally appears on Bastard.
Tracks 8 originally appears on Ballady, alongside re-recordings of tracks 1, 3, and 7.
Track 4 originally appears on Róże miłości najchętniej przyjmują się na grobach.
Tracks 5, 11 and 12 originally appear on Szydercze zwierciadło.
Tracks 9 and 10 originally appear on Biało-czarna.

== Personnel ==
Kat & Roman Kostrzewski

- Roman Kostrzewski – vocals
- Krzysztof "Pistolet" Pistelok – guitars
- Michał Laksa – bass
- Piotr Radecki – guitars

Additional musicians

- Piotr "Pienał" Pęczek – drums
