= Kat & Roman Kostrzewski =

Polish band

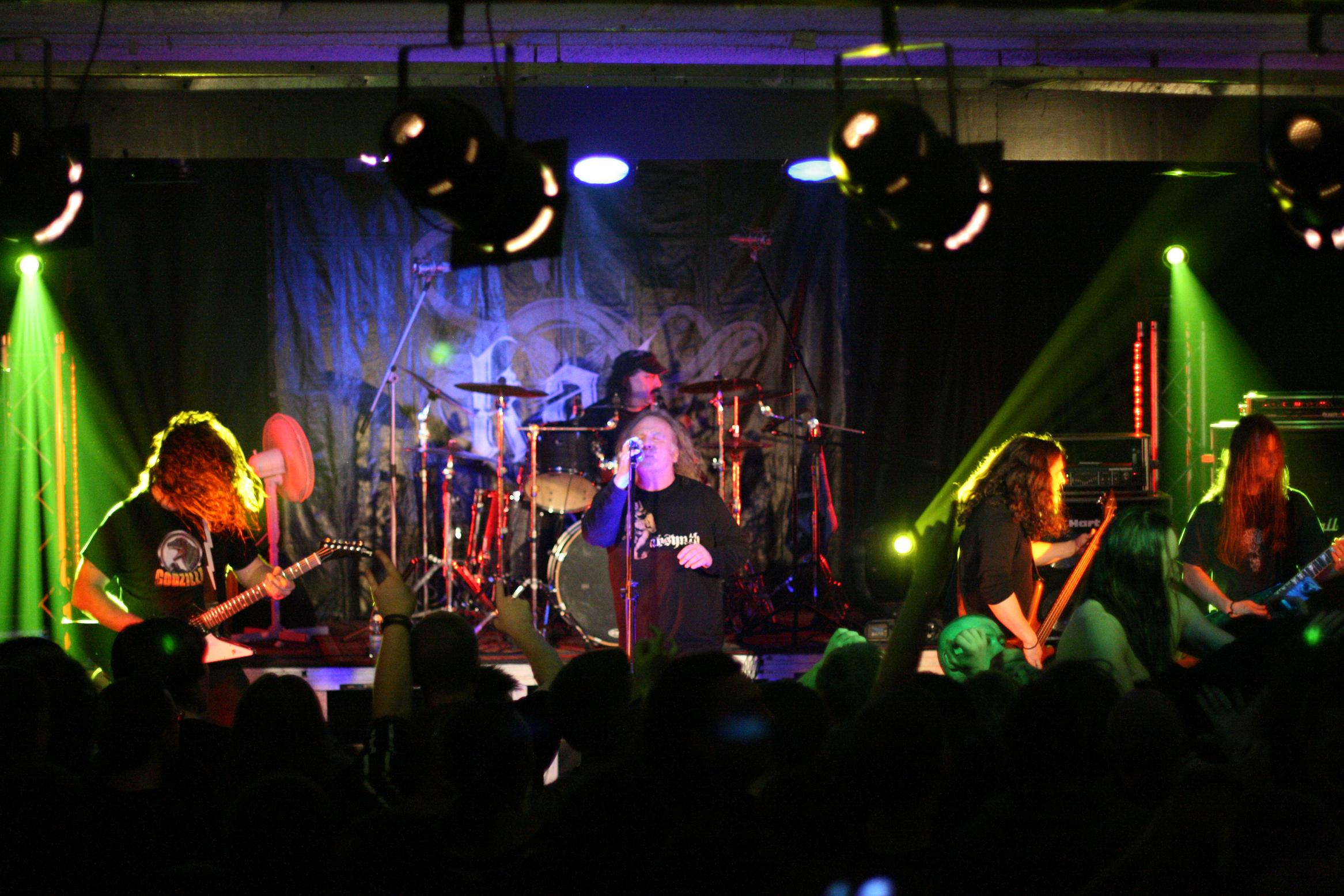
- Kat & Roman Kostrzewski, 2010

Background information
- Origin: Katowice, Poland
- Genres: Thrash metal, Black metal
- Years active: 2004–2022
- Labels: Mystic Production
- Members: Roman Kostrzewski; Krzysztof Pistelok; Ireneusz Loth; Piotr Radecki; Michal Laksa
- Past members: Paweł Pasek; Waldemar Moder
- Website: http://www.kat.info.pl

Kat & Roman Kostrzewski ("Kat & RK") was a Polish thrash metal band formed by Roman Kostrzewski and Ireneusz Loth after they had left their original band KAT in 2004. Some of the fanbase of KAT views Kat & Roman Kostrzewski as its successor, mainly due to the characteristic vocals of Roman, his lyrics and choice to sing in Polish as in most of KAT's original albums.

Since 2004 the group has toured extensively through Poland, while composing material for their first album Biało-czarna" (White-and-black), which was released in April 2011 by Mystic Production. The first samples off the new album were released in late 2010.

On February 10, 2022, Roman Kostrzewski died of cancer at the age of 61.

== Band members ==
Final lineup

- Roman Kostrzewski – vocals (2004–2022) (died in 2022)
- Michał Laksa – bass (2004–2022)
- Krzysztof "Pistolet" Pistelok – guitar (2005–2022)
- Jacek Hiro – guitar (2015–2022)
- Jacek Nowak – drums (2019–2022)

Former members

- Ireneusz Loth – drums (2004–2019)
- Piotr Radecki – guitar (2004–2009, 2010–2015, died in 2025)
- Waldemar "Valdi" Moder – guitar (2004–2005) (died 2012)
- Paweł "Bajtel" Pasek – guitar (2009–2010, 2015)

Live members

- Krzysztof "Fazi" Oset – bass (2008, 2009)
- Jarosław Niemiec – bass (2015)

Session musicians

- Piotr "Pienał" Pęczek – drums (2014)

== Discography ==
=== Studio albums ===
Title	Album details	Peak chart positions
Title	Album details	POL
Biało-czarna	Released: April 11, 2011; Label: Mystic Production; Formats: CD, CD+LP	4
Buk - akustycznie	Released: September 8, 2014; Label: Mystic Production; Formats: CD, CD+LP, digital download	7
666	Released: September 13, 2015; Label: Mystic Production; Formats: CD, CD+LP	6
Popiór	Released: March 1, 2019; Label: Independent; Formats: CD, LP, digital	–
"—" denotes a recording that did not chart or was not released in that territory.

=== Video albums ===
Title	Video details
Życie po życiu	Released: December 3, 2007; Label: Mystic Production; Formats: DVD
