= Biało-czarna =

Studio album by Kat & Roman Kostrzewski
- Released: 11 April 2011
- Recorded: Underground Studio, Rzeszów, Poland, 2010
- Genre: Thrash metal
- Length: 60:04
- Language: Polish
- Label: Mystic Production
- Producer: Leszek "Czubek" Wojtas, Roman Kostrzewski

Kat & Roman Kostrzewski chronology
Biało-czarna (2011)	Buk - akustycznie (2014)

Professional ratings
Review scores
Source	Rating
Teraz Rock	4/5 stars

Biało-czarna is the first album by Polish thrash metal band Kat & Roman Kostrzewski. It was released on 11 April 2011, by the label Mystic Production.

The album's name is a wordplay on the term "Biało-czerwona" (White-and-red), which is used to refer to the Polish flag or anything representing Poland in general, i.e. the national football team or the army. Black replaces Red, as the black color is used to represent the Catholic church and its priests in black cassocks. The album cover features the Polish flag in greyscale, with a cross over the white eagle, symbolizing "parasitic" influence of the Church over the country together with the title. The lyrics as well revolve around common critiques of the Polish Catholic Church, and the Catholic Church in general, including child molestation, criminal impunity and corruption.

== Track listing ==
No.	Title	Lyrics	Music	Length
1.	"Bara" (instrumental)		Ireneusz Loth, Krzysztof Pistelok, Michał Laksa	7:17
2.	"Maryja Omen"	Roman Kostrzewski	Krzysztof Pistelok, Roman Kostrzewski	5:17
3.	"Szkarłatny Wir"	Roman Kostrzewski	Krzysztof Pistelok, Roman Kostrzewski	6:42
4.	"Diabelski Dom IV"	Roman Kostrzewski	Roman Kostrzewski	7:34
5.	"Milczy Trup"	Roman Kostrzewski	Ireneusz Loth, Krzysztof Pistelok, Roman Kostrzewski	6:20
6.	"Wolni Od Klęczenia"	Roman Kostrzewski	Krzysztof Pistelok, Roman Kostrzewski	3:52
7.	"Kupa Świąt"	Roman Kostrzewski	Ireneusz Loth, Krzysztof Pistelok, Roman Kostrzewski	4:55
8.	"Bieluń" (instrumental)			6:25
9.	"Z Boskim Zyskiem"	Roman Kostrzewski	Krzysztof Pistelok, Roman Kostrzewski	5:35
10.	"Kapucyn Zamknął Drzwi"	Roman Kostrzewski	Roman Kostrzewski	6:07

== Personnel ==
Kat & Roman Kostrzewski

- Roman Kostrzewski – vocals
- Krzysztof Pistelok – guitars
- Michał Laksa – bass
- Ireneusz Loth – drums

Additional musicians

- Paweł Pasek – guitars
- Piotr Radecki – guitars

Production

- Leszek "Czubek" Wojtas, Roman Kostrzewski – production, mixing, mastering
- Leszek "Czubek" Wojtas, Przemysław Rzeszutek – recording
- Roman Kostrzewski – cover art and layout
- Katarzyna Hętkowska – photography

Note

- Recorded at Underground Studio, Rzeszów, Poland, 2010

== Charts ==
Chart (2011)	Peak position
Polish Albums (ZPAV)	4
