= Koniec Świata =

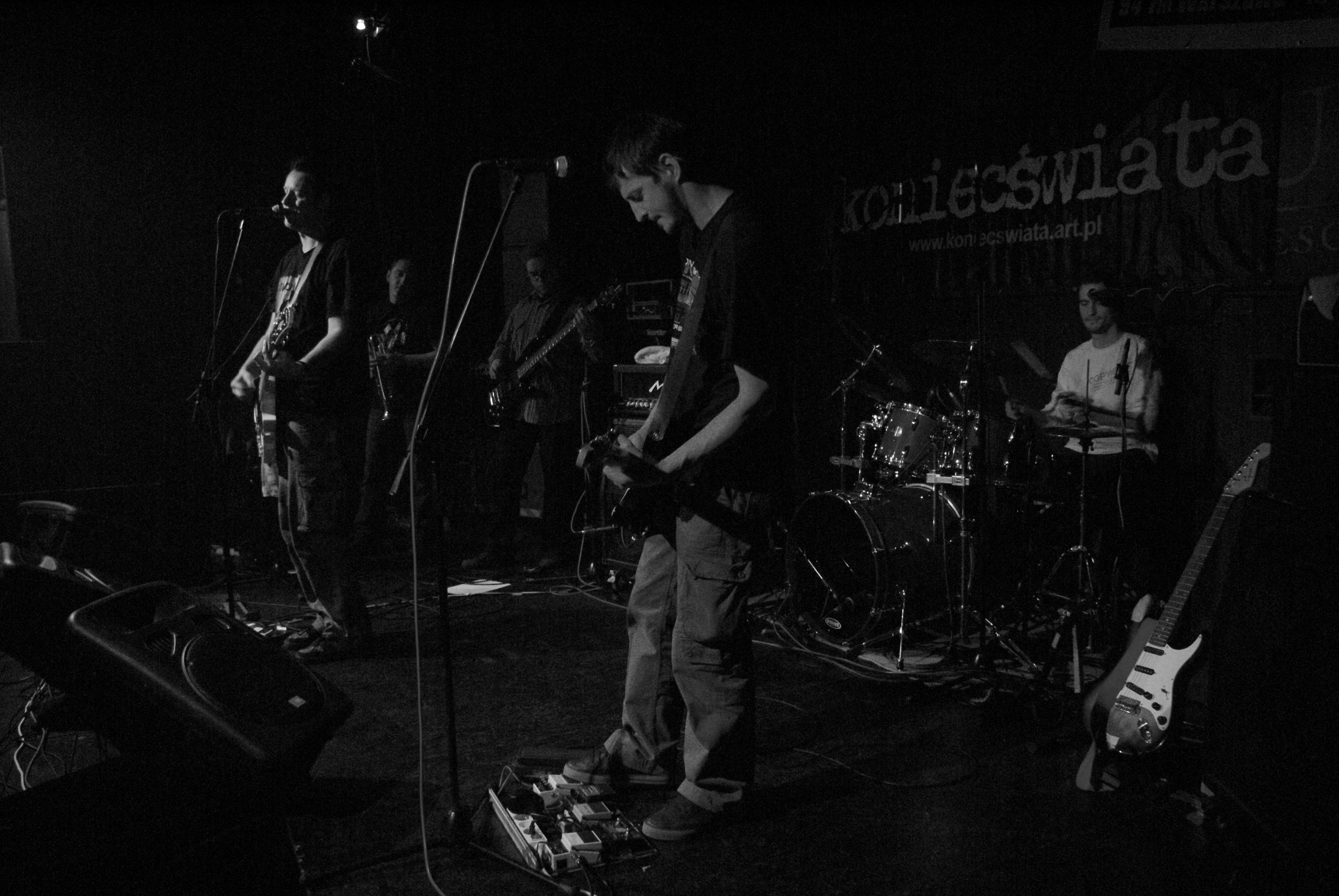
Koniec Świata Live concert in 2007

Koniec Świata ("The End Of The World") is a Polish musical band which plays a mixture of punk, rock and ska music. The band was founded in 2000 in Katowice by Jacek Stęszewski who has been the only consistent member of the band from its beginning. They have issued ten albums (8 studio albums and 2 compilations) so far.

The current line-up is: Jacek Stęszewski (vocals, guitar), Jacek Czepułkowski (lead guitar), Szymon Cirbus (trumpet), Marek Mrzyczek (bass guitar) and Michał Leks (drums). The band's style evolved over time, and on the first two albums punk and ska are more noticeable, while on the next albums the music is going towards the rock style, and on the last album, some electronic music elements appear – mainly because it was the first time the band was working on an album together with a producer Łukasz Olejarczyk. Almost all lyrics are in polish by Stęszewski. Koniec Świata have played on the biggest festivals in Poland, such as Jarocin Festival and several times on Pol'and'Rock Festival.

In 2012 they have played together with Hey, Acid Drinkers and Pidżama Porno on the second edition of reactivated Odjazdy festival in Spodek. Despite the fact that the texts are almost exclusively in Polish, the band regularly visits other countries, such as the Czech Republic, Germany, Ukraine, England or Canada. Currently it is one of the most popular punk/rock/ska band in Poland.

== Members ==
=== Current members ===
- Jacek Stęszewski – lyrics, vocals, guitar
- Jacek Czepułkowski – lead guitar
- Szymon Cirbus – trumpet
- Marek Mrzyczek – bass guitar
- Michał Leks – drums

=== Past members ===
- Michał Sobczyk – drums (2013–2018)
- Wojciech Filipek – bass guitar (2007–2011)
- Piotr Połaniecki – drums (2003–2007)
- Łukasz Gocal – drums (2007–2008)
- Tomasz Widera – bass guitar (2000–2004)
- Olo Juraszczyk – drums (2003)
- Łukasz Gmyrek – drums (2000–2001)
- Witek Ilwicki – lead guitar (2001–2001)
- Sebastian Szatanik – drums (2001–2003)
- Grzegorz Imielski – drums (2008–2009)
- Dawid Frydryk – trumpet (2000–2001)

== Discography ==
- (2000) – Korzenie (tape only)
- (2002) – Symfonia na sprzedaż
- (2005) – Kino Mockba
- (2006) – Korzenie (CD re-edition)
- (2007) – Burgerbar
- (2010) – Oranżada
- (2011) – X Lat (compilation)
- (2012) – Hotel Polonia
- (2015) – XV lat (compilation)
- (2016) – God Shave The Queen
- (2021) – Durny

== See also ==
- Akurat
- Crystal Viper
- Farben Lehre
- Happysad
- StarGuardMuffin
