= Władysławowo =

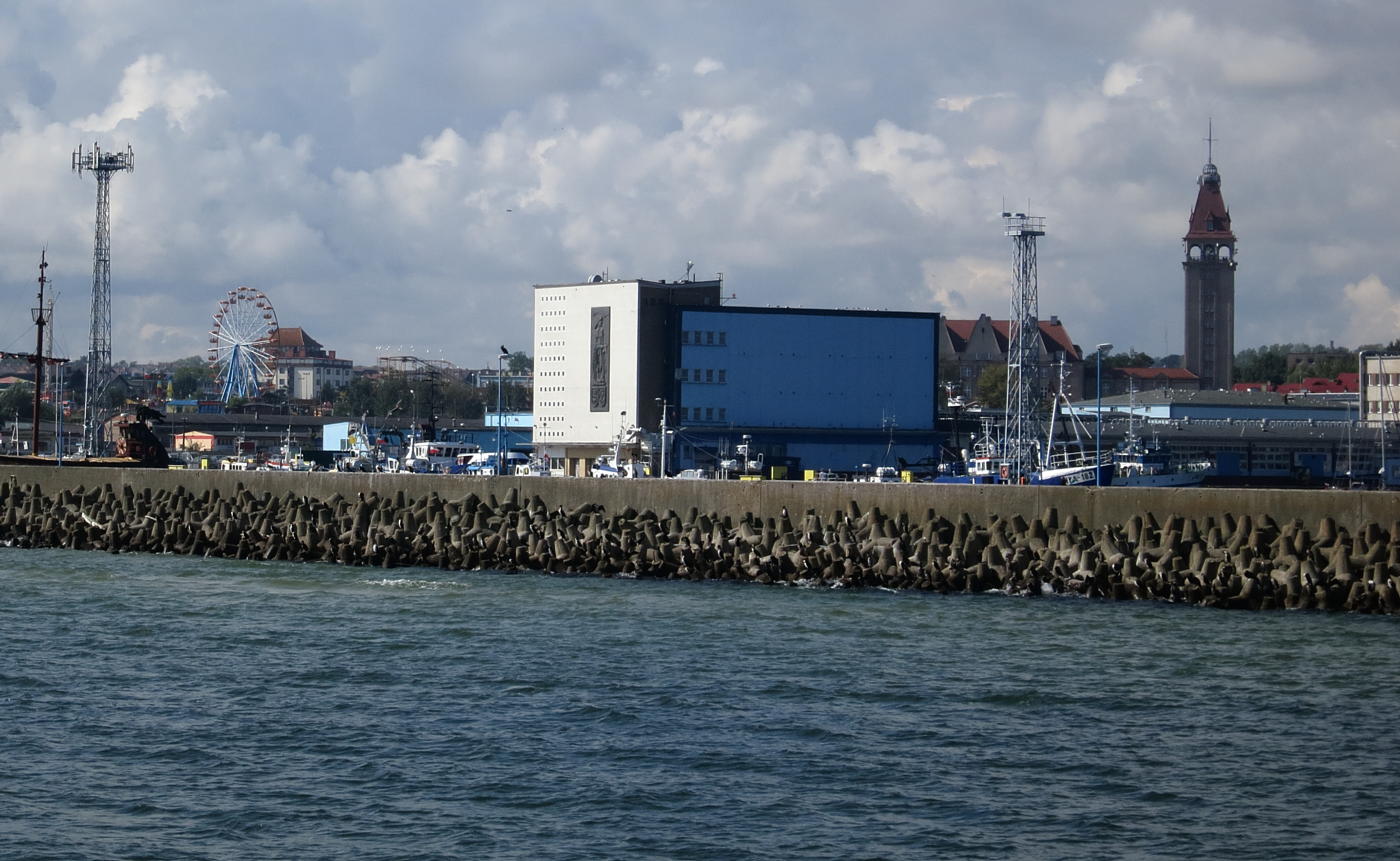
- Władysławowo

- Flag Coat of arms
- Interactive map of Władysławowo
- Location within Poland
- Coordinates: 54°50′2″N 18°18′56″E
- Country: Poland
- Voivodeship: Pomeranian
- County: Puck
- Gmina: Władysławowo
- First formal settlement: 12th Century
- Broke ground: March 1936
- Official inauguration: 3 May 1938
- Town rights: 30 June 1963

Government
  - Mayor: Roman Kużel

Area
  - Total: 13.7 km^{2} (5.3 sq mi)
- Highest elevation: 68 m (223 ft)
- Lowest elevation: 0 m (0 ft)

Population (2022)
  - Total: 9,363
  - Density: 683/km^{2} (1,770/sq mi)
- Time zone: UTC+1 (CET)
  - Summer (DST): UTC+2 (CEST)
- Postal code: 84-120
- Area code: +48 58
- Car plates: GPU
- Website: http://www.wladyslawowo.pl

Władysławowo [vwadɨswaˈvɔvɔ] (Kashubian/Pomeranian: Wiôlgô Wies [ˈvʲɞlɡɞ ˈvʲɛs], German: Großendorf) is a town on the south coast of the Baltic Sea in the Pomeranian Voivodeship in northern Poland, with 9,363 inhabitants as of 2022. It is located within the ethnocultural region of Kashubia in the historic region of Pomerania.

== History ==
=== Early history ===
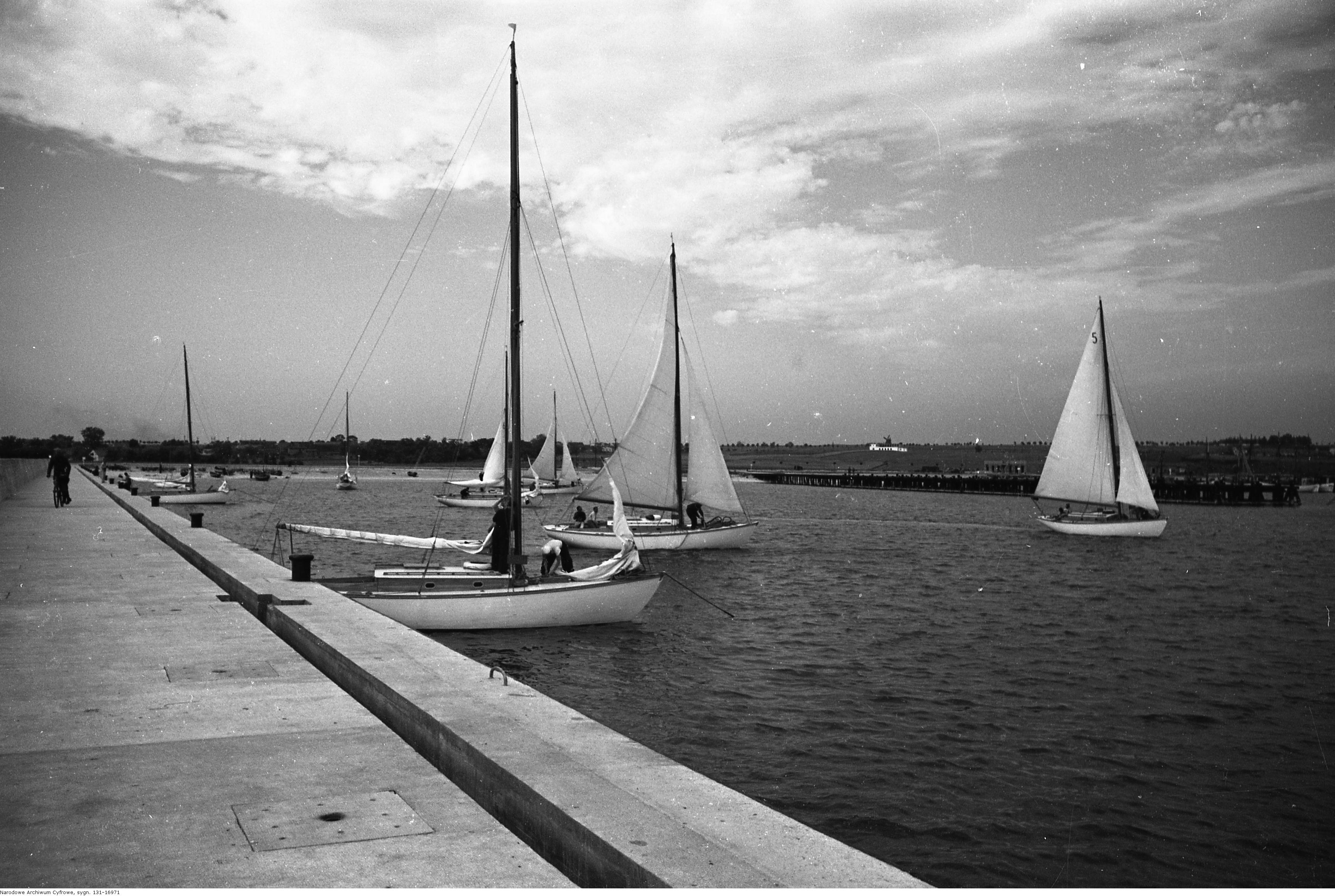
Fishing dock in 1938

In 1634 engineer Fryderyk Getkant designed a fort called Władysławowo located on the Hel Peninsula, several kilometers east of today's town of Władysławowo. It was officially recorded as a fort a year later.

It was successfully built as a new town as a Polish fishing port in 1930s during the Polish Second Republic, with fishing a key part of the Polish economy at the time. Construction began in March 1936, and the new town was officially inaugurated on the 3 May 1938.

=== World War II ===
Fights to liberate the Hel Peninsula started on October 9, 1939. On that day, Nazi forces took Puck, and were ready to take Swarzewo. a On October 10, 1939, Nazi German forces attacked then-known-as Wielka Wieś. However, the Polish forces won, making the German forces withdraw from Wielka Wieś. The village was held by Polish forces for about 2 weeks, after then being occupied. A mural was dedicated to this exact battle in Władysławowo.

=== Post-war ===
It was named after King Władysław IV Vasa, who initiated the construction of the Polish Navy.

After growing and incorporating several of the surrounding villages and settlements into its boundaries since then the town officially received town rights on 30 June 1963. It continued to expand through with several more villages becoming its neighbourhoods.

Currently Władysławowo is a sea port and a popular seaside holiday destination.

== Administration ==
The gmina (urban-rural municipality) of Władysławowo consists of the town Władysławowo (with a district Cetniewo) and seven villages: Chałupy (to the east, on the Hel Peninsula), Rozewie, Jastrzębia Góra, Ostrowo, Karwia and Tupadły. Several of these places serve as popular seaside resorts.

The city is currently situated in the Puck County in the Pomeranian Voivodeship, since the 1999 reorganisation. It was previously in Gdańsk Voivodeship, between 1975 and 1998.

== Geography ==
Poland's northern extremity is situated in Jastrzębia Góra, marked by the Gwiazda Północy ("Northern Star") monument, which stands on a cliff overlooking the beach that is the actual most northerly point. The nearby headland of Cape Rozewie was formerly believed to be the country's most northerly point, prior to measurements carried out in December 2000.

== Transport ==
Port of Władysławowo is a seaport located within the city.

Władysławowo and Władysławowo Port are PKP railway stations in the town.

== Notable people ==
- Hermann Keidanski (1865–1938) a German-Jewish chess master
- Nocne Szczury (literally: Night Rats) a Polish punk rock band formed in 1980

== Gallery ==
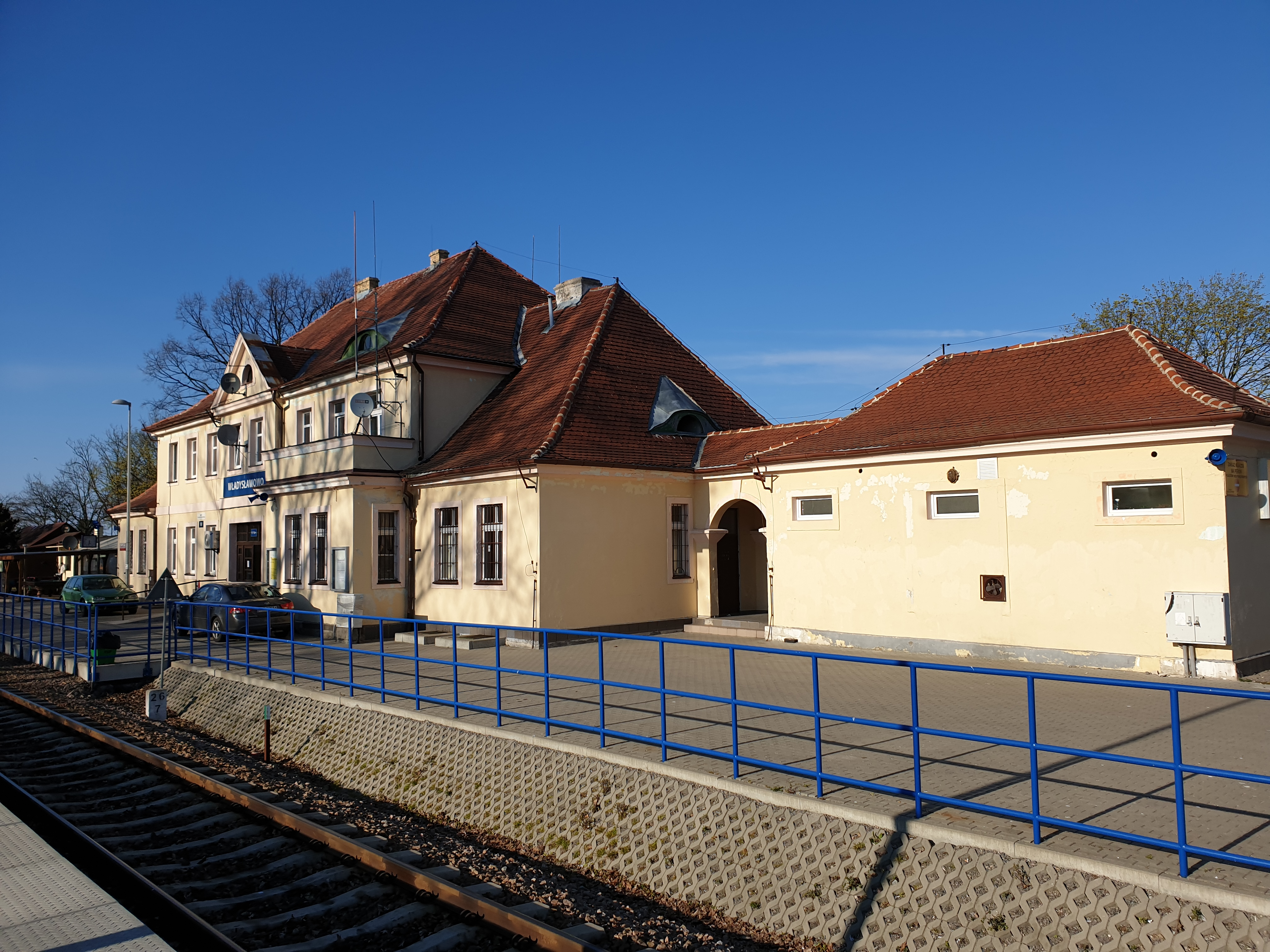
Władysławowo railway station

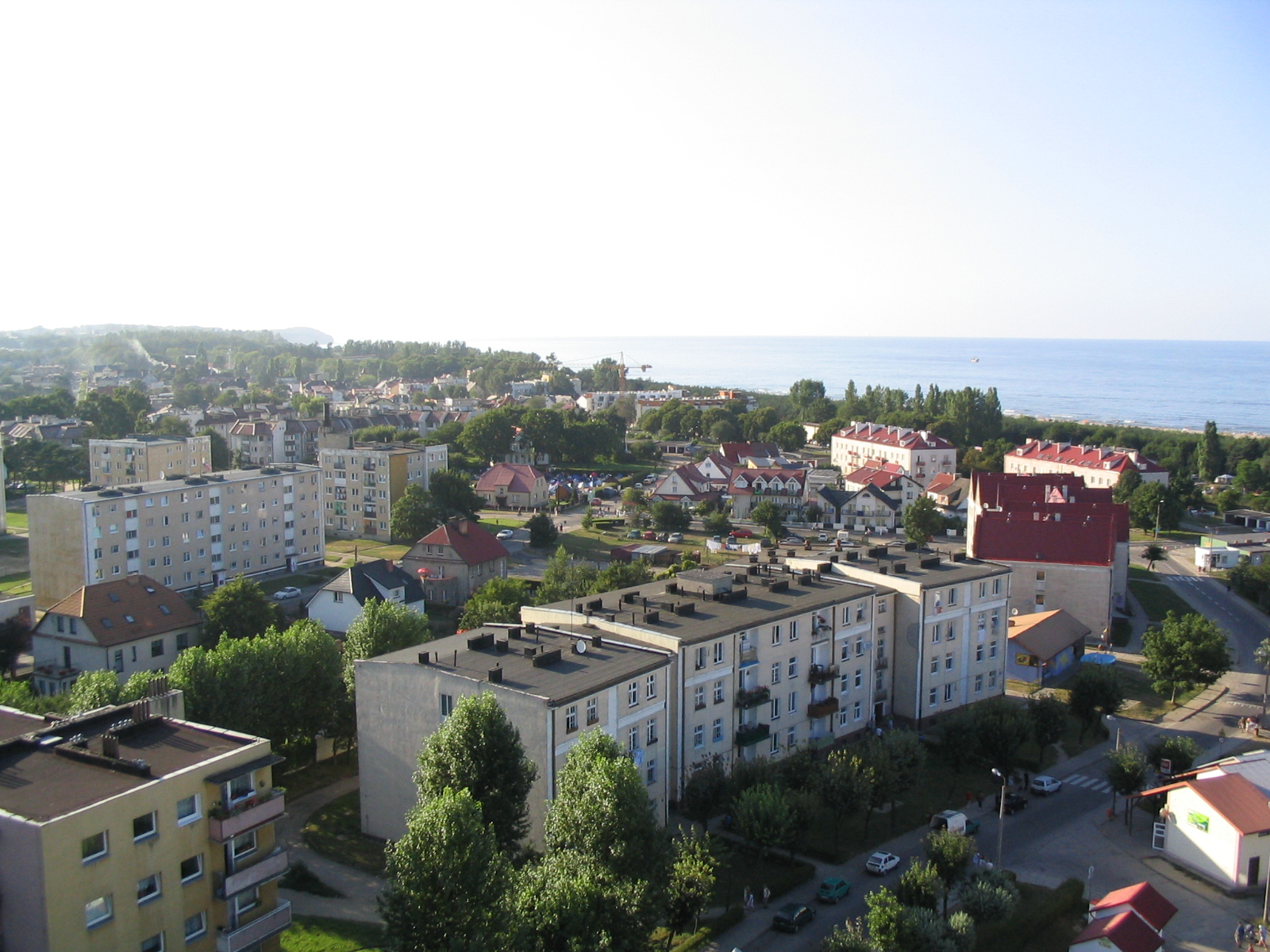

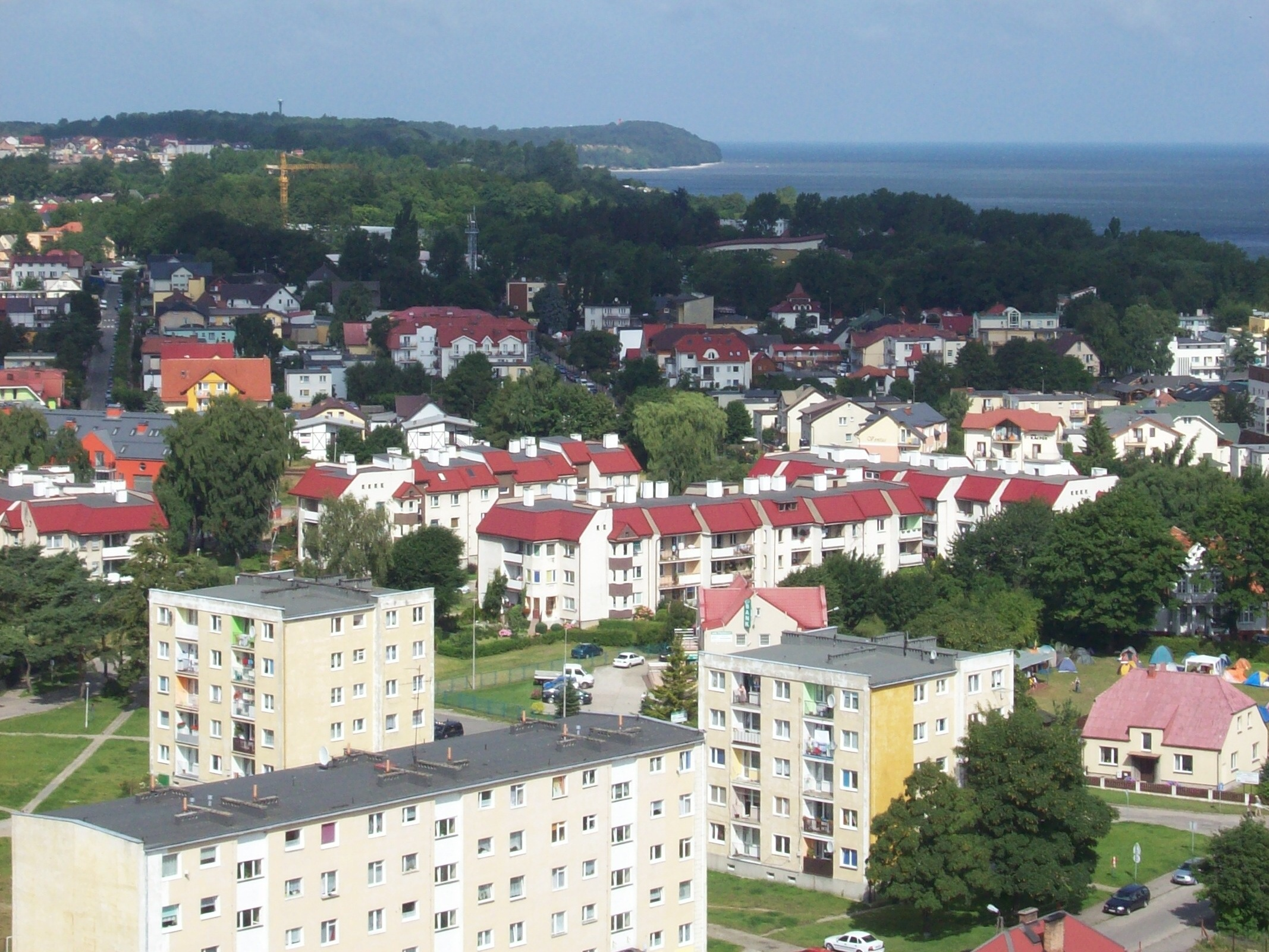

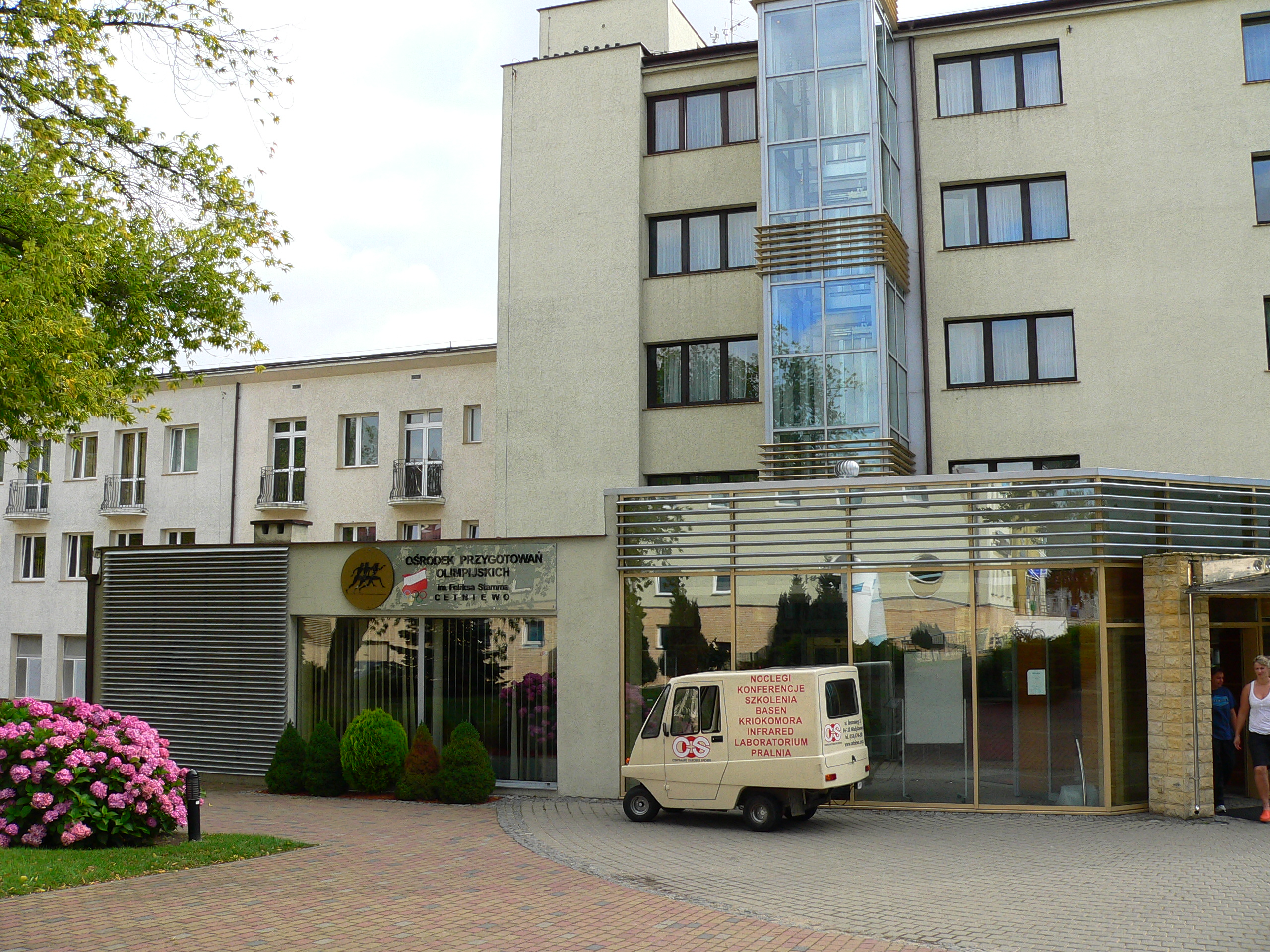
Cetniewo

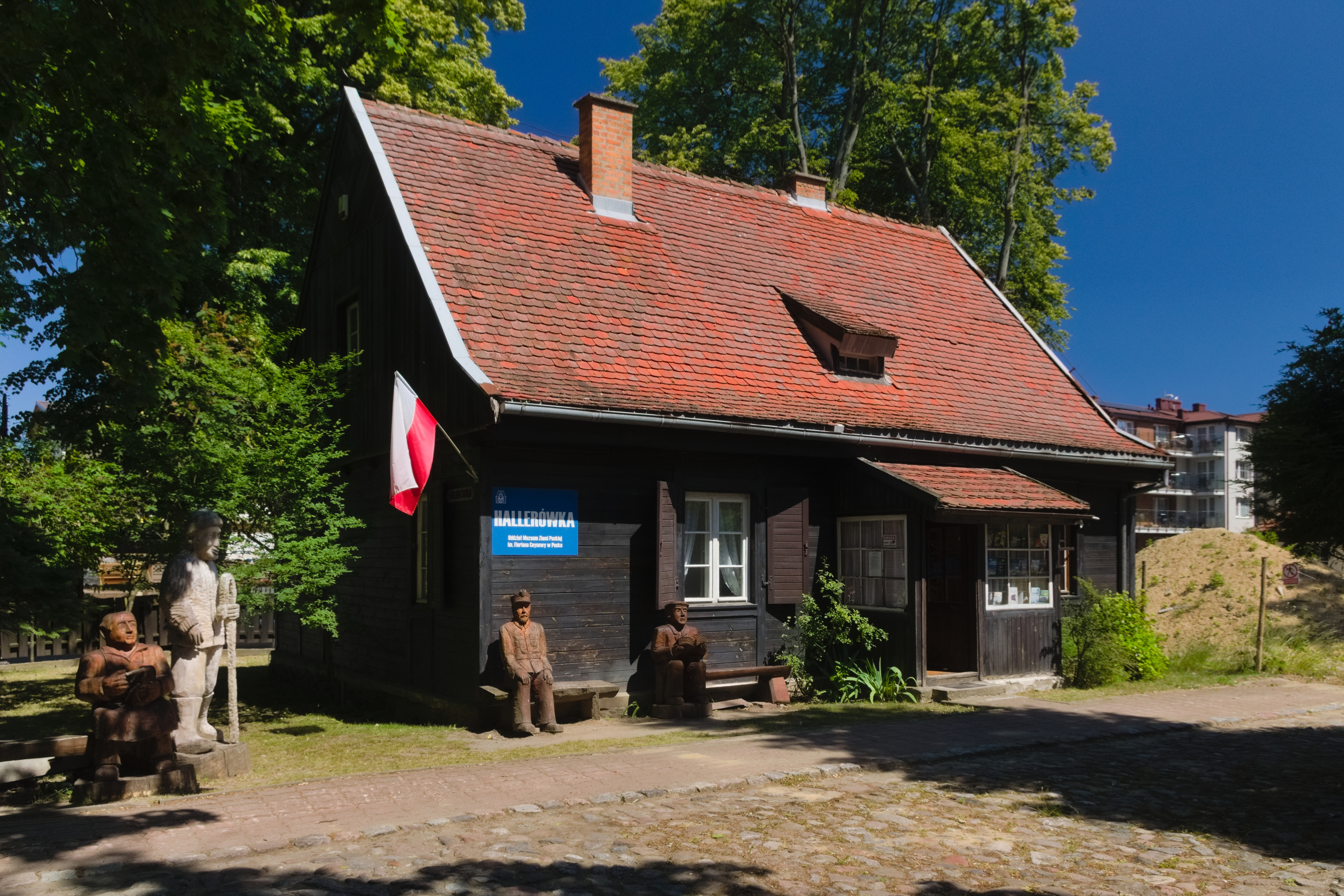
Former house of General Józef Haller, now museum

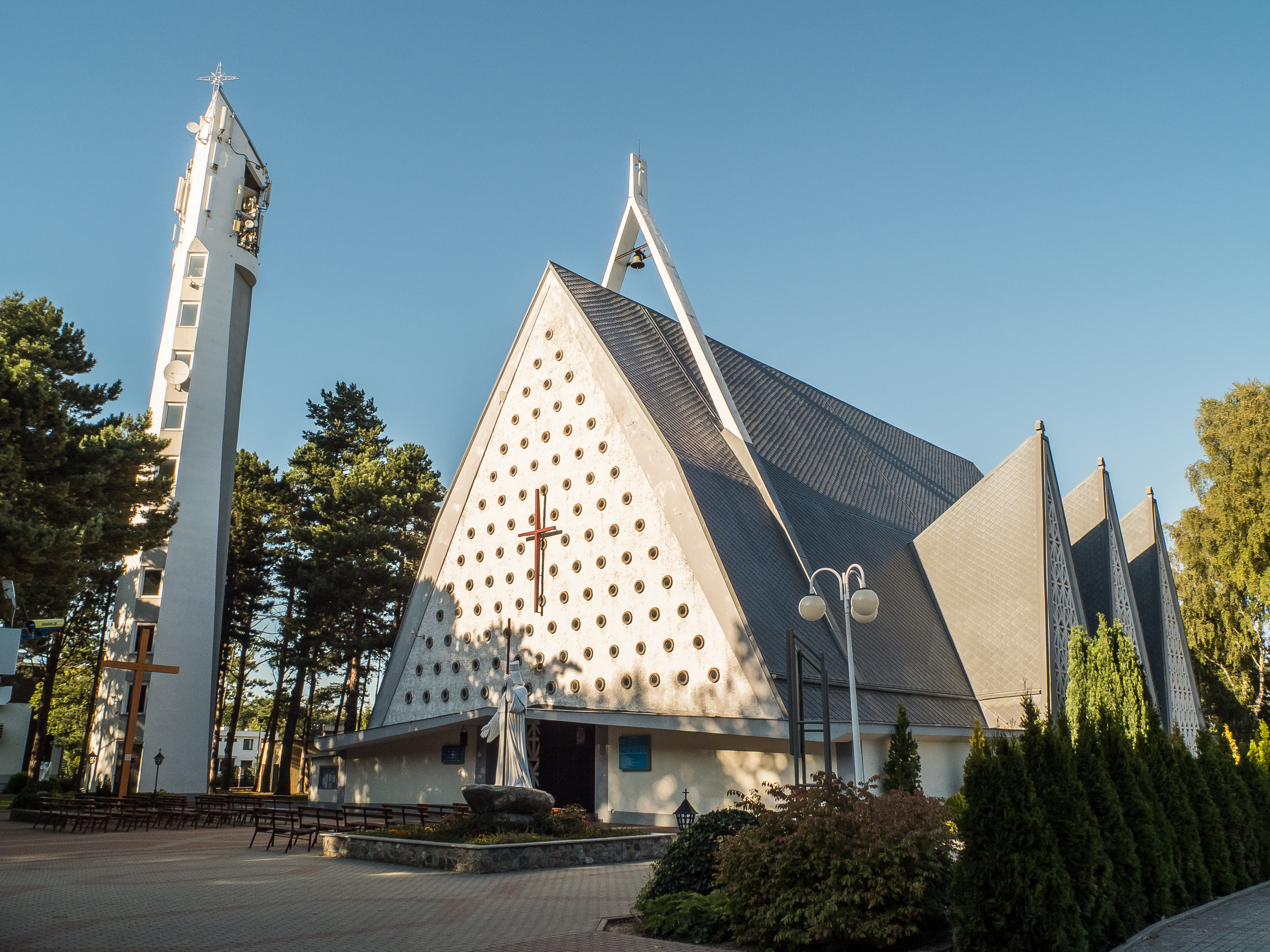
Church of the Assumption

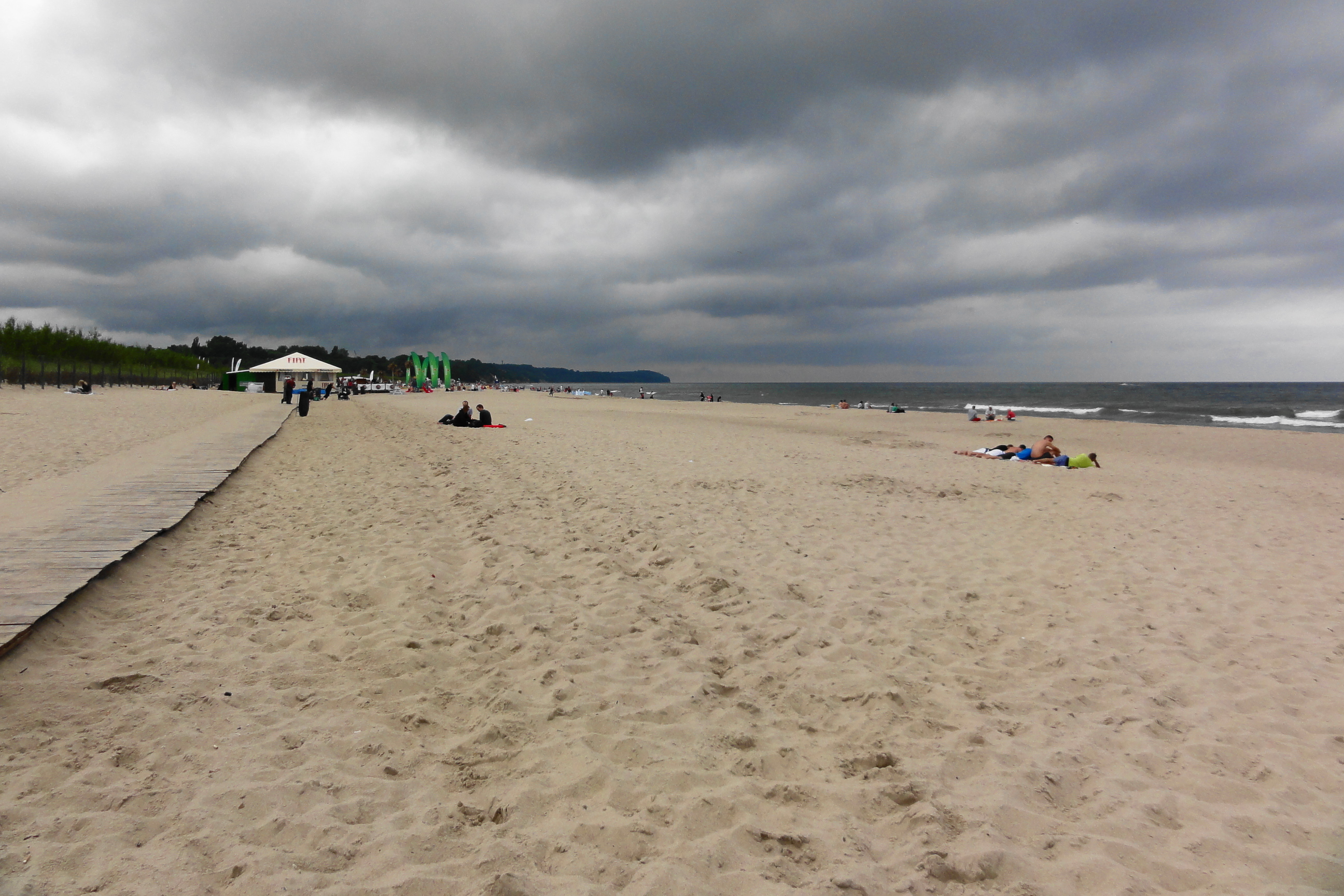
Władysławowo Beach

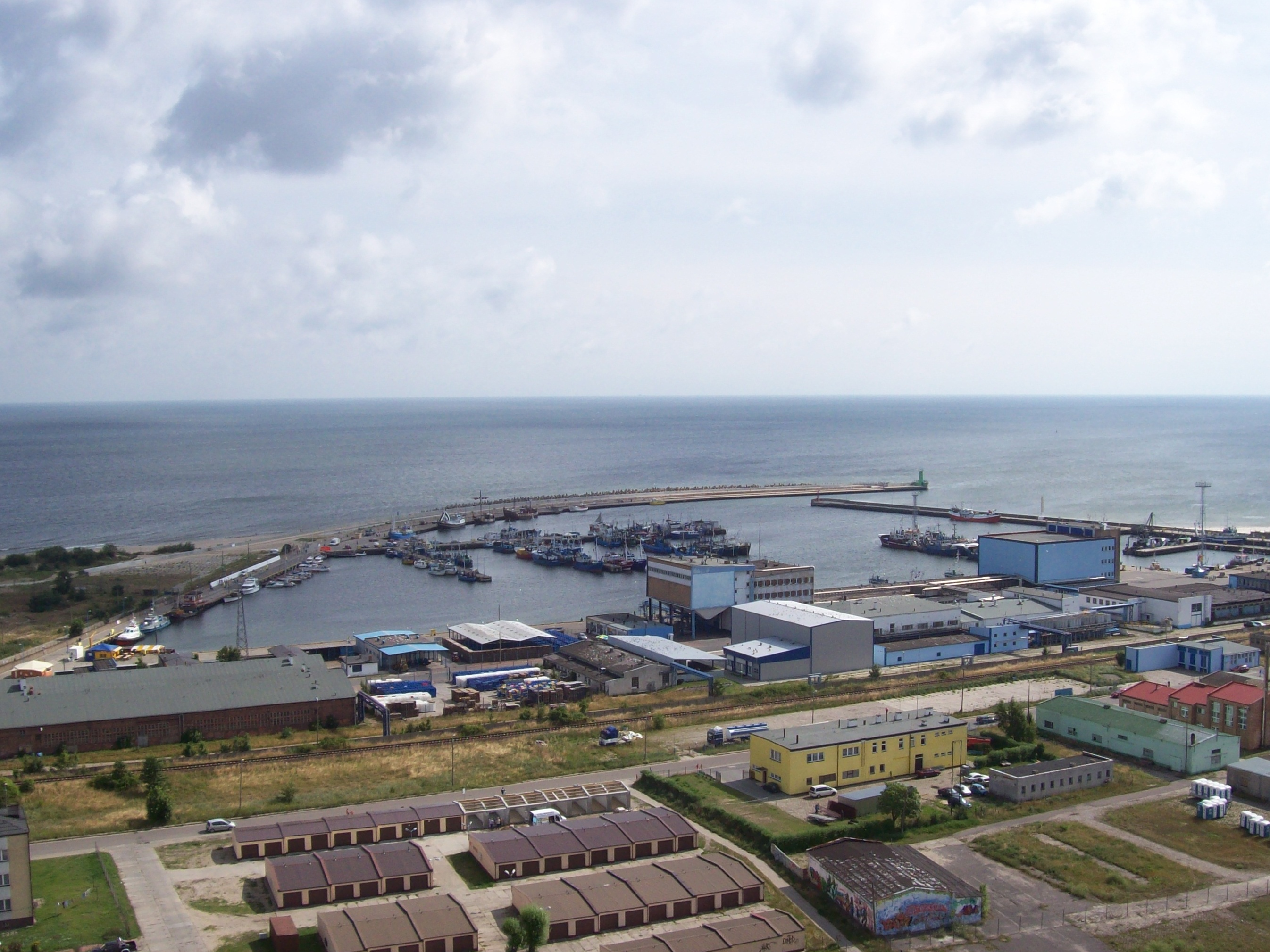
Port of Władysławowo

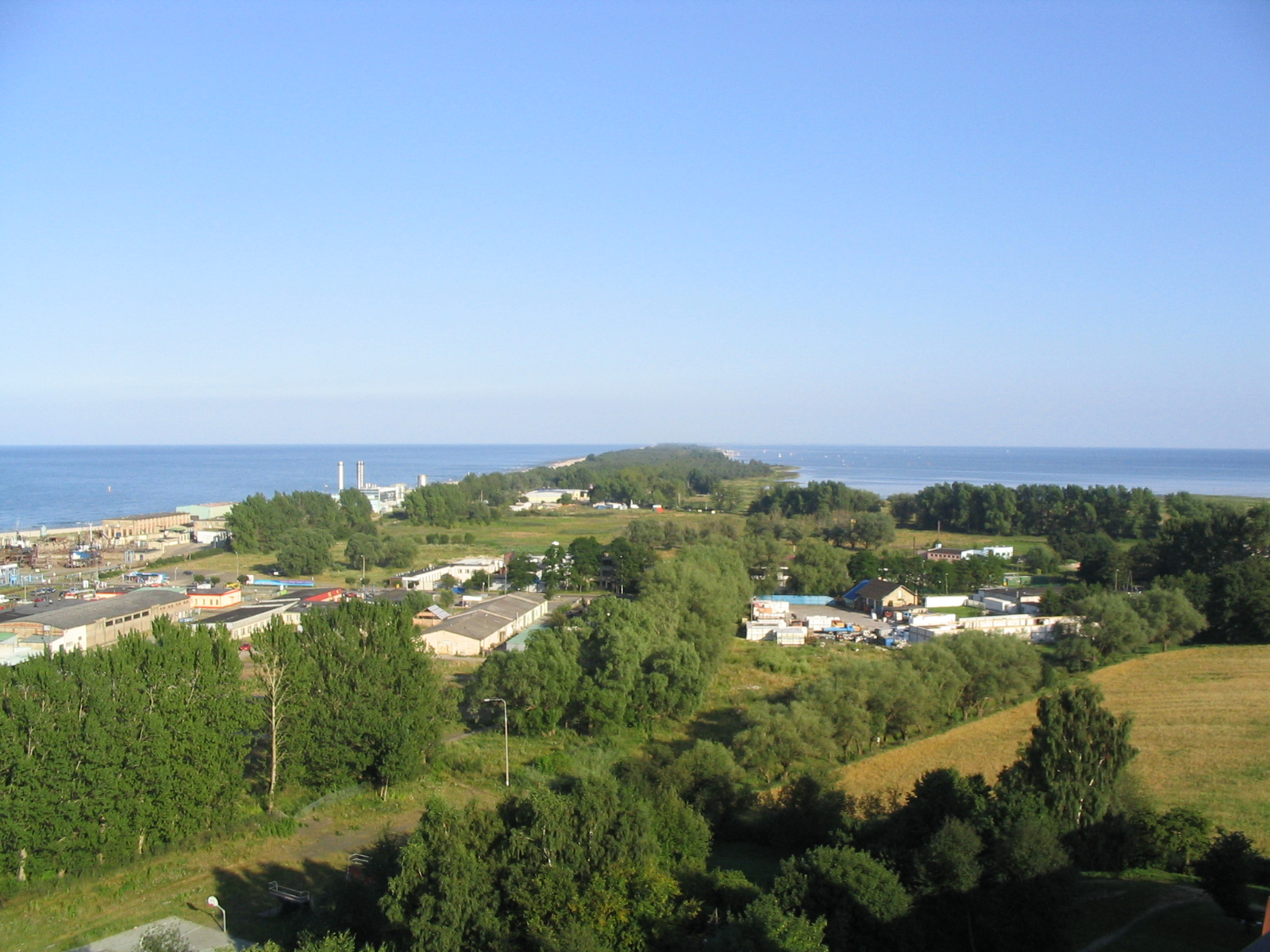
Hel Peninsula as seen from the tallest building in Władysławowo

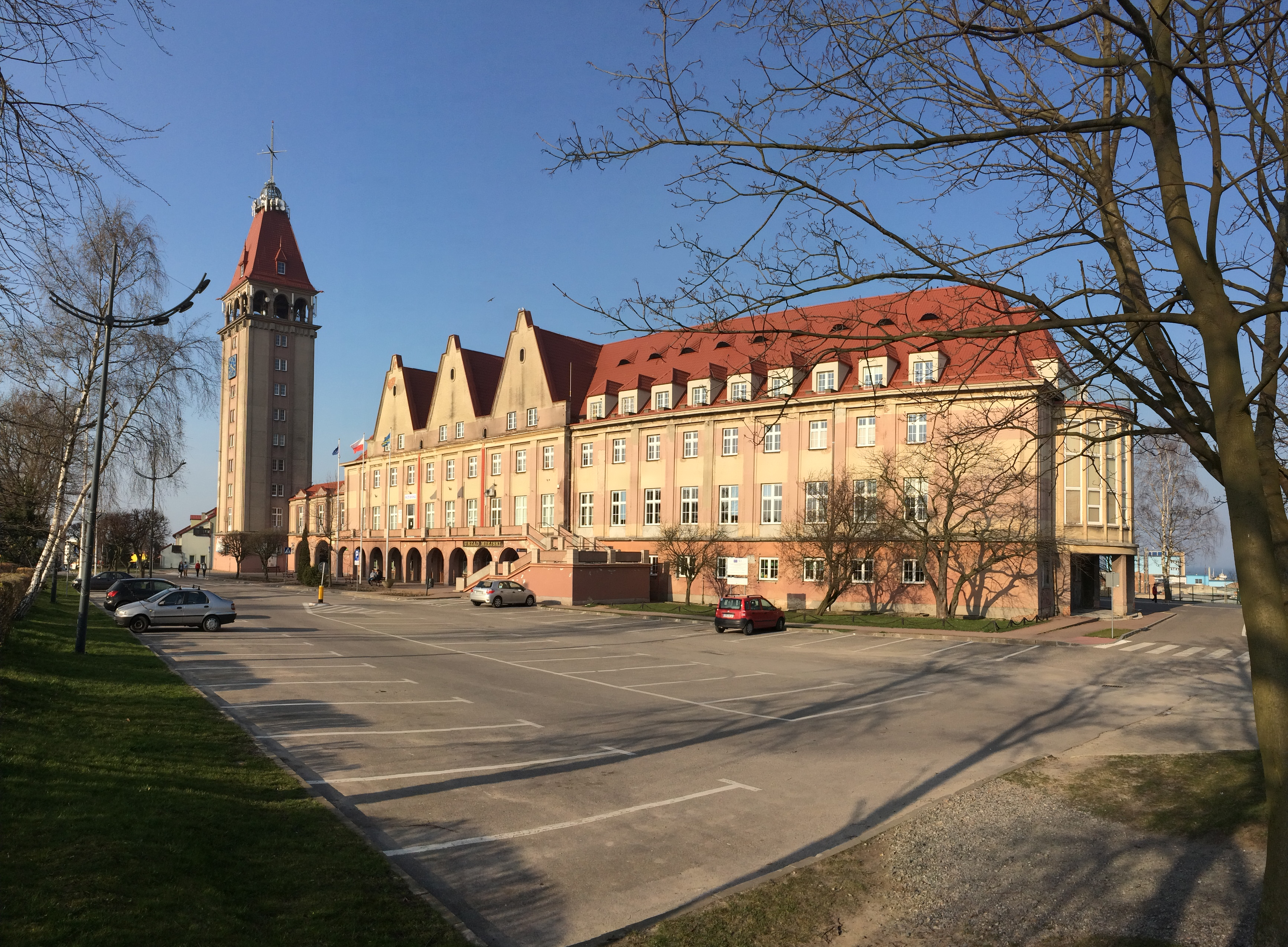
Władysławowo town hall
