= Nocne Szczury =

Polish punk rock band from Władysławowo

Background information
- Origin: Władysławowo, Poland
- Genres: Hardcore punk; punk rock
- Labels: Pasażer
- Members: Zbigniew "Zibi" Konkol; Jarosław Mach; Mirosław Sieradzki; Piotr Humanowski; Jerzy Sikora

Nocne Szczury were a Polish punk rock band from Władysławowo. Alongside Tilt, Kryzys, and Deadlock, they were one of the first punk bands formed in the Polish People's Republic. Dezerter, today one of the most popular and influential punk bands from Poland, was formed one year after Nocne Szczury's first major performance.

The Władysławowo-based band, whose name in Polish means "Nocturnal Rats" or "Night Rats", were inspired by recordings of the Sex Pistols. In 1980, they were the first punk band to perform at the Jarocin Festival (at the time known as the "All-Polish Review of Music of Young Generation in Jarocin"). They have been described as pioneers of punk rock in Poland.

In March 2014 their EP 1980 was released on vinyl - it contained recordings of Nocne Szczury from August 1980, when they performed live at the "First All-Polish Review of New Rock Wave Bands in Kołobrzeg". A relatively small number of 1980 copies were produced: 360 on black vinyl (regular version), 70 copies pressed on green vinyl (limited edition), and 70 special variants on gold vinyl (limited edition).

== Band members ==
- Zbigniew "Zibi" Konkol – vocals
- Jarosław Mach – bass guitar
- Mirosław Sieradzki – guitar
- Piotr Humanowski – guitar
- Jerzy Sikora – drums

== Discography ==
- 2014: 1980 (EP, vinyl)
