= Metal and Hell =

1986 album by Kat

Studio album by Kat
- Released: April 1986
- Recorded: October–November 1985
- Studios: Beat Studio, Izabelin Studio
- Genres: Thrash metal, black metal
- Length: 36:42
- Producers: Kat & Andrzej Puczyński

Kat chronology
Metal and Hell (1986)	666 (1986)

Metal and Hell is the debut album by Polish heavy metal band Kat. It was released in 1986.

== Track listing ==
All lyrics are written by Roman Kostrzewski; all music is composed by Kat.

No.	Title	Length
1.	"Metal and Hell"	2:43
2.	"Killer"	3:15
3.	"Time of Revenge"	4:43
4.	"Devil's House, Part I"	4:47
5.	"(You Got Me) Vampire"	3:11
6.	"Devil's Child"	3:32
7.	"Black Hosts"	3:26
8.	"Oracle"	3:41
9.	"Devil's House, Part III"	3:41
10.	"666"	3:32
Total length:		36:42

== Credits ==
Kat

- Roman Kostrzewski – vocals, lyrics, cover design
- Piotr Luczyk – guitars, logo design, booklet design
- Jacek Regulski – guitars
- Krzysztof Oset – bass
- Ireneusz Loth – drums

Production

- Andrzej Puczyński – production, mixing
- Jerzy Kurczak – artwork
- Leszek Brzoza – photography
- Mirosław Mur-Neinert – cover design
- Jarosław Szubrycht – liner notes
- Witold Rumian – layout

== 666 ==
666

Studio album by Kat
- Released: May 1986
- Recorded: October–November 1985, TEATR Studios, Kraków
- Genres: Thrash metal, black metal
- Length: 36:32
- Label: Polmark

Kat chronology
Metal and Hell (1986)	666 (1986)	Oddech wymarłych światów (1988)

A Polish version of Metal and Hell was released in 1986, with a slightly different track ordering, which was titled 666. This version was re-recorded in 2015 by Roman Kostrzewski's current project, Kat & Roman Kostrzewski.

=== Track listing ===
All lyrics by Roman Kostrzewski, except where otherwise noted.

No.	Title	Length
1.	"Metal i piekło" (Metal and Hell)	2:43
2.	"Diabelski dom - cz. I" (Devil's House, Part I)	4:46
3.	"Morderca" (Killer)	3:15
4.	"Masz mnie wampirze" ((You Got Me) Vampire)	3:11
5.	"Czas zemsty" (Time of Revenge)	4:47
6.	"Noce Szatana" (Devil's Child (lyrics by Robert Millord))	3:32
7.	"Diabelski dom - cz. III" (Devil's House, Part III)	3:41
8.	"Wyrocznia" (Oracle)	3:41
9.	"Czarne zastępy" (Black Hosts)	3:30
10.	"666"	3:26
Total length:		36:32

== Credits ==
Kat

- Roman Kostrzewski – vocals, lyrics
- Piotr Luczyk – guitars
- Wojciech Mrowiec – guitars
- Tomasz Jaguś – bass
- Ireneusz Loth – drums

Production

- Jos Kloek – engineering
- Andrzej Solecki - engineering (assistant)
- Piotr Brzeziński - engineering (assistant)
- Halina Jarczyk - engineering (assistant)
- Piotr Lyczkowski – cover art
