= Jarocin Festival =

Rock music festival in Europe

The Jarocin Festival is a rock music festival in Poland. In the 1980s, it was one of the biggest and most important rock music festivals in Europe, and by far the biggest festival of alternative music in the Warsaw Pact countries. Following reduced popularity in the 1990s after the collapse of the Eastern Bloc, it was closed in 1994, but was revived in 2005 and continues to this day.

== History ==
Founded in 1980, the festival was based on the earlier Wielkopolskie Rytmy Młodych (Greater Poland’s Rhythms of the Youth), which had been organised in Jarocin since 1971. In 1980, due to Walter Chelstowski’s initiative, its name was changed to Ogólnopolski Przegląd Muzyki Młodej Generacji w Jarocinie (All-Polish Review of Music of Young Generation in Jarocin) and subsequently, musicians and bands from the whole country were invited. Later on, its name was changed again - to Festiwal Muzyków Rockowych (Rock Musicians’ Festival).

Jarocin’s festival was based in terms of its organisation and atmosphere on the famous American Woodstock Festival, thus it is sometimes called the Polish Woodstock. In the 1980s it was regarded as an escape from the drab reality of the late period Polish People's Republic. It lasted 3 days, and was usually held at the beginning of August. The Festival attracted thousands of fans (e.g. in 1986 there were more than 30,000 of them), who lived in tents and came to listen to music which was otherwise hardly (or never) played on Polish radio or TV. Still, many believe that Jarocin was designed by the totalitarian government's secret services, to create a "safe outlet" for the restless Polish youth.

A variety of music was played over the course of the festival, but generally speaking, "alternative" genres - blues, rock, heavy metal, punk rock, and reggae were played. Bands performed on two stages, with the bigger one located on the local football pitch. Many fans brought cassette players with them to record the music. This was one of the only chances to record and distribute music on cassettes that didn't appear in official mass-media.

Among the most popular bands that played or debuted in Jarocin, there are:

- Dżem
- TSA
- KSU
- Armia
- Dezerter
- Siekiera
- Kult
- Brygada Kryzys
- Kat
- Sztywny Pal Azji
- Acid Drinkers
- Koniec Świata
- New Model Army
- Therapy
- The Misfits
- Babayaga Ojo
- Feeling B

The festival played an important part in the early days of the Polish punk scene, with Nocne Szczury, one of the earliest punk bands in Poland, being the first punk rock band to perform there in 1980.

== Suspension and revival ==
Jarocin Festival lost its popularity in the early 1990s, after the collapse of the Eastern Bloc and the resulting easier access to alternative music. The new generation of festival-goers was also more aggressive, and in 1994, after riots and clashes with police, the festival was suspended. It resumed again in 2005.

As of 2025, the festival was still operating, with new events planned for 2026.
