= Sztywny Pal Azji =

Polish rock band

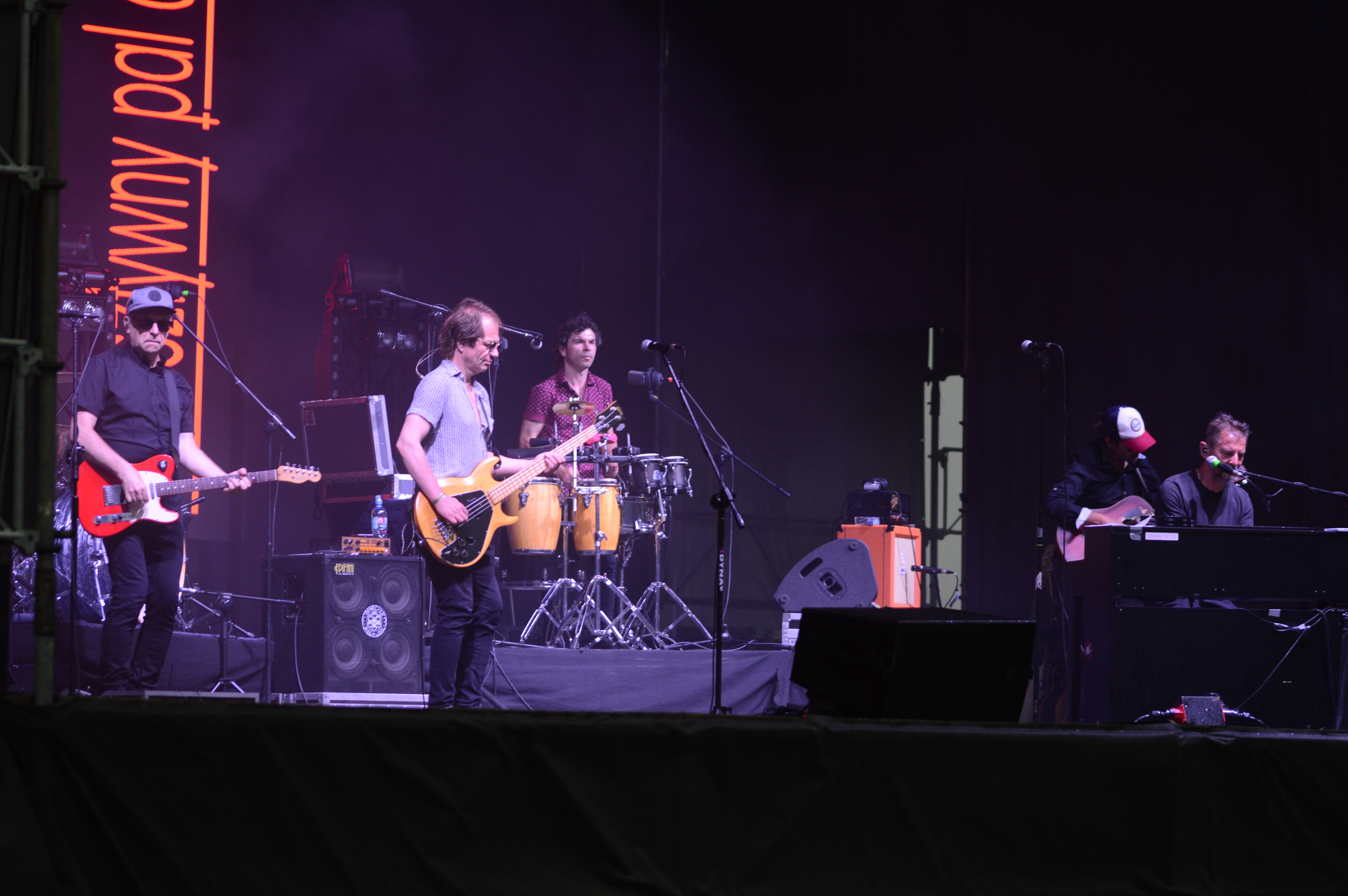
- Sztywny Pal Azji (2022)

Background information
- Origin: Chrzanów
- Genres: Rock
- Years active: 1986–present
- Members: Leszek Nowak; Jarosław Kisiński; Krystian Różycki; Zbigniew Ciaputa; Wojciech Wołyniak; Paweł Nazimek
- Website: Official Site

Sztywny Pal Azji is a Polish rock band that was popular in the late 1980s and early 1990s. It was founded in 1986 in Chrzanów by Jarosław Kisiński, a guitarist and composer of the band's hits. Sztywny Pal Azji first came to prominence during the 1986 Jarocin Festival, gaining a large following with its mix of punk rock, reggae and pop. It also played at Jarocin in 1987, 1988 and 1989, and its eponymous 1987 debut album Europa i Azja (Europe and Asia) saw two hits, Spotkanie z... (A Meeting with...) and Wieża radości, wieża samotności (The Tower of Joy, the Tower of Loneliness), included in Marek Niedźwiedzki's desired Third Program on Polish Radio.

1989's Szukam nowego siebie (Looking for a New Self) included such hits as Smutna środa (Sad Wednesday) and Nie zmienię świata (I Won't Change the World). However, in the course of time the band's popularity began to diminish and the band fell apart in the 1990s.

Sztywny Pal Azji returned in the summer of 2007, and recorded a new album with new lead singer Bartosz Szymoniak. The LP was released on 22 February 2008 under the title Miłość jak dynamit (Love Like Dynamite).
