= Juraszczyk =

Polish surname

Juraszczyk is a Polish surname of Czech–Slovak or South Slavic origin.

The last name itself is Polish, found almost exclusively among people of Polish descent, however its roots are from the South Slavs. Transliterated forms including Juraščik, Јурашчик, Юрашчык, Юращик all derive from the stem Juras, which appeared mostly in Moravia, although in countries like Serbia, Croatia and Slovakia it was also met as Juraš (transliterated Jurasz, or Jurash), related to Juraj and Jura. It is a patronymic surname created from an old local dialect and comes from Greek 'Georgios', meaning 'George' (in Polish: 'Jerzy').

Many forms of the 'Juraš' surname, that is the main part of 'Juraszczyk', occur in many forms not only in Poland, Serbia, Croatia and Slovakia, but also for instance in Slovenia, the Czech Republic, Hungary, Ukraine and Moldova. These include Juraszewicz, Jurašević or Đurašević, the latter mostly being found in Serbia and Montenegro.

Moreover, there are such Italian surnames as Gjuras, Giuras and Giurassi, which are believed to be cognate with the South Slavic 'Juras' and 'Đuras'.
