= Kat (band) =

Polish heavy metal band

KAT
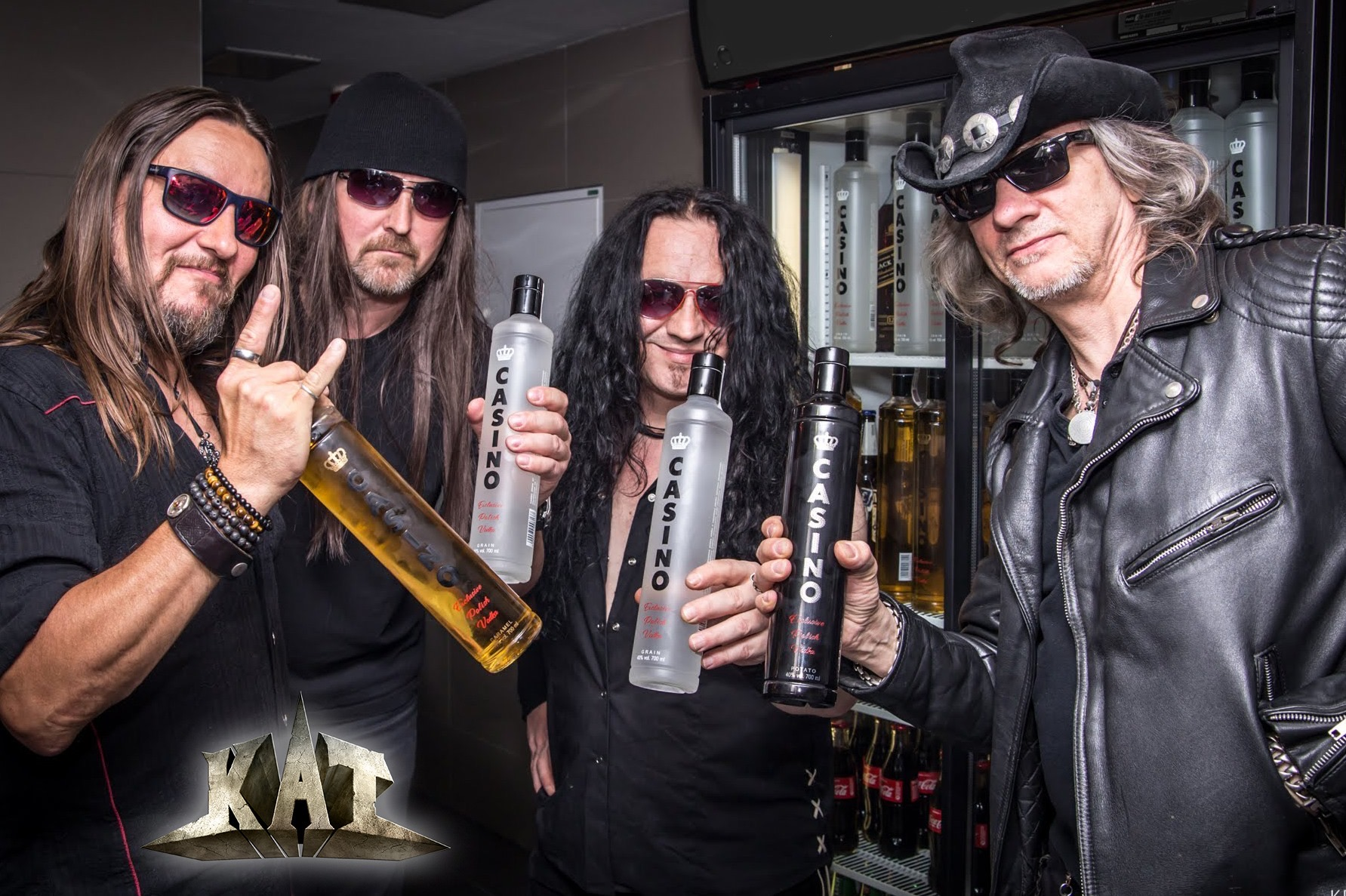
- KAT in 2019. L-R: Qbek Weigel, Mariusz Prętkiewicz, Adam Harris Jasiński, Piotr Luczyk

Background information
- Origin: Katowice, Poland
- Genres: Speed metal, thrash metal, heavy metal
- Years active: 1979–1988, 1990–1999, 2001–present
- Labels: Metal Mind, Silverton, Poljazz, Klub płytowy "Razem", Stuff, DBC, Ambush, Pronit, Pure Steel
- Members: Piotr Luczyk; Qbek Weigel; Mariusz Prętkiewicz; Adam Harris Jasiński
- Website: kat-band.com

Kat (stylized as KAT) is a Polish heavy metal band formed in Katowice in 1979.

KAT is considered one of the most influential bands in Polish and Central European heavy metal, and is also mentioned as one of the main precursors of thrash. KAT's most famous album is "Oddech wymarłych światów" (The Breath of Extinct Worlds), considered an opus of Polish heavy metal. The band is best known for tracks "Czas zemsty" (Time of revenge), "Łza dla cieniów minionych" (A tear for the shadows gone) and "Wyrocznia" (Oracle).

The word "kat" means executioner.

== History ==
KAT was founded in 1979 by guitarist Piotr Luczyk. Firstly he invited drummer Ireneusz Loth to the band, and shortly after, they were joined by bassist Tomasz Jaguś and another guitarist, Ryszard Pisarski. They played instrumental music influenced by hard rock bands, mainly Deep Purple, Led Zeppelin, and the heavy metal band, Black Sabbath. In 1981, during the first edition of the Silesian Rock festival, the band found a singer, Roman Kostrzewski. The line-up was filled out by guitarist Wojciech Mrowiec and in 1984 KAT released the debut single "Noce szatana / Ostatni tabor" (Polish for The Nights of Satan / The Last Train). Robert 'Lor' Milewski wrote the lyrics of both songs; since then Kostrzewski became the lyricist, incorporating poetry, Polish folklore, and mysticism. The band performed on tour with Hanoi Rocks.

In 1986 KAT released their debut album, Metal and Hell with a Belgian productions company named Ambush Records with the producer Jos Kloek. A Polish-language version of this full-length was released as a limited album the same year, however, the Polish version of the album was named 666. Soon after, Wojciech Mrowiec was fired from the band. In 1987 KAT performed twice as a support band for Metallica in Katowice's Spodek. This show was documented on KAT's live album 38 Minutes of Life. At that time they also supported Running Wild, Helloween, and Overkill.

A year after the concerts with Metallica, KAT released the next full-length album in 1988, "Oddech wymarłych światów" (Breath of extinct worlds). After this a conflict stirred up between Luczyk and Kostrzewski, and the band went on hiatus. KAT renewed their activity in 1990 and in 1992 played with TSA and Acid Drinkers at the Jarocin Festival. Two years later, some songs played previously at the Festival appeared along new ones on a new album, Bastard (1992).

In 1994 in Wisła a new album entitled "Ballady" (Ballads) was compiled and recorded in a Christian Studio – Deo Rocording, which proved to argue against the publics' and journalists' accusations of Satanism. It includes KAT's ballads from previous albums, previously unreleased tracks, and two completely new songs. Józef Skrzek (SBB) was a guest keyboard. In that year, Metal Mind Productions re-released the three first of Kat's albums. Kat sued the company and, after a few years, won the case.

In 1996, KAT released the albums "Róże miłości najchętniej przyjmują się na grobach" (Roses of love best flourish on graves), following this the conflict between Luczyk and Kostrzewski re-ignited. This conflict was so prominent that it resulted in the following album "Szydercze zwierciadło" (The Mocking Mirror) being recorded with all band members recording separately without even seeing each other in the studio. After this album, the band stopped its activity. Luczyk focused on other musical projects and Kostrzewski formed a new band Alkatras. Unfortunately, in 1999 Jacek Regulski died in a motorcycle accident. After strong convincing from Slawomir Dziewulski (manager), Luczyk agreed for a joint tour under the name KAT; the finale of this tour was a joint show with Iron Maiden and the release of the album and DVD Somewhere in Poland in 2003.

Straight after the release of Somewhere in Poland, in 2004 the band decided to fire drummer Ireneusz Loth, and singer and lyricist Roman Kostrzewski. Mariusz Prętkiewicz replaced the former drummer; Jarosław Gronowski joined as a second guitarist (he substituted Luczyk during the "Szydercze zwierciadło" tour, since Luczyk did not want to participate due to bad organisation of the tour), and Henry Beck became the new singer. The new lineup released Mind Cannibals in 2005. The lineup changes were very controversial, and band's fan base actually split in two, because Roman Kostrzewski and Ireneusz Loth also created their own band, and continue to perform since then, as Kat&Roman Kostrzewski.

After recording Mind Cannibals, the band went on tour around Europe (playing together with, Six Feet Under), but did not play in Poland, and later performed on tour with Helloween.

Between 2005 and 2014, the band became inactive, and in 2014 returned with the release of an acoustic album – "Acoustic – 8 filmow", where Maciej Lipina performed as a guest vocalist. During this time, vocalist Henry Beck formed his own band, and Adam Harris Jasinski (who was discovered by Luczyk at a cover festival) played as the new bassist. Finally, the new line-up was formed in 2016, Henry Beck was replaced by Qbek Weigel as vocalist. With the new line-up, Kat signed a worldwide contract with a German productions company Pure Steel Records and released their newest album titled Without Looking Back on 14 June 2019.

The band's planned tour for Without Looking Back was cancelled due to the COVID-19 pandemic. As a result, the band returned to the studio and began recording music for their next studio album. In July 2020, the band announced that their new album, The Last Convoy, would be released on 25 September. The album would feature cover songs of classic rock bands and re-recorded versions of the band's songs from previous albums. The album featured several guest musicians, including former vocalist Henry Beck and former Judas Priest vocalist Tim "Ripper" Owens.

On 10 February 2022, original vocalist Roman Kostrzewski died from cancer at the age of 61.

On 12 September 2026, the band announced their twelfth studio album, Death Is Not Enough, which was released on 23 October.

== Members ==
=== Current members ===
- Piotr Luczyk – guitar (1979–1988, 1990–1999, 2002–present)
- Mariusz "Rogol" Prętkiewicz – drums (2004–present)
- Adam "Harris" Jasiński – bass guitar (2014–present)
- Marek "Qbek" Weigel – vocals (2016–present)

=== Former members ===
- Ireneusz Loth – drums (1979–1988, 1990–1999, 2002–2004)
- Tomasz Jaguś – bass guitar (1979–1986)
- Ryszard Pisarski – guitar (1979–1984)
- Roman Kostrzewski – vocals (1981–1988, 1990–1999, 2002–2004) (died 2022)
- Wojciech Mrowiec – guitar (1984–1986)
- Krzysztof Stasiak – bass guitar (1986–1988)
- Krzysztof Oset – bass guitar (1990–1999, 2002–2014)
- Jacek Regulski – guitar (1990–1999) (died 1999)
- Jarek Gronowski – guitar (2004–2006)
- Henry Beck – vocals (2005–2016)

== Discography ==
=== Studio albums ===
| Title | Album details | Peak chart positions |
| Title | Album details | POL |
|---|---|---|
| Metal and Hell | Released: April 1986; Label: Ambush Records; Formats: CD, CS | — |
| 666 | Released: May 1986; Label: Klub Płytowy Razem; Formats: CD, LP, CS | — |
| Oddech wymarłych światów | Released: May 1988; Label: Pronit; Formats: CD, LP, CS | 49 |
| Bastard | Released: August 1992; Label: Silverton; Formats: CD, CS | 27 |
| Ballady | Released: 1994; Label: Silverton; Formats: CD, CS | 25 |
| Róże miłości najchętniej przyjmują się na grobach | Released: 1996; Label: Silverton; Formats: CD, CS | 24 |
| Szydercze zwierciadło | Released: 1997; Label: Silverton; Formats: CD, CS | 29 |
| Mind Cannibals | Released: 24 October 2005; Label: Mystic Production; Formats: CD, LP | — |
| Acoustic – 8 Filmów | Released: 10 February 2014; Label: Metal Mind Productions; Formats: CD, digital download | — |
| Without Looking Back | Released: 14 June 2019; Label: Pure Steel Records; Formats: CD, digital download | 44 |
| The Last Convoy | Released: 25 September 2020; Label: Pure Steel Records; Formats: CD, digital download, vinyl | — |
| Death Is Not Enough | Released: 23 October 2026; Label: Logosound; Formats: CD, digital download, vinyl | — |
"—" denotes a recording that did not chart or was not released in that territory.

=== Live albums ===
| Title | Album details | Peak chart positions |
| Title | Album details | POL |
|---|---|---|
| 38 Minutes of Life | Released: December 1987; Label: Poljazz; Formats: CD, LP, CS | — |
| Jarocin – Live | Released: 1994; Label: Silton; Formats: CD, CS | — |
| Somewhere in Poland | Released: 5 July 2004; Label: Mystic Production; Formats: CD | 40 |
"—" denotes a recording that did not chart or was not released in that territory.

=== Singles ===
| Title | Year |
|---|---|
| "Ostatni tabor/Noce szatana" | 1985 |
| "Metal and Hell/Oracle" | 1986 |
| "Time of Revenge/Czas Zemsty" | 1986 |
| "Róże miłości najchętniej przyjmują się na grobach" | 1996 |

=== Compilation albums ===
| Title | Album details | Peak chart positions |
| Title | Album details | POL |
|---|---|---|
| Kat 1985–2005 | Released: 3 December 2007; Label: Metal Mind Productions; Formats: CD | — |
| Rarities | Released: 12 November 2013; Label: Metal Mind Productions; Formats: CD, digital download | 49 |
"—" denotes a recording that did not chart or was not released in that territory.

=== Video albums ===
| Title | Album details |
|---|---|
| Somewhere in Poland | Released: 13 December 2004; Label: Mystic Production; Formats: DVD |

=== Other ===
| Title | Album details | Notes |
|---|---|---|
| Czarne zastępy: W hołdzie KAT | Released: 1996; Label: Pagan Records; Formats: CD, CS | a tribute to KAT album |
