= Roman Kostrzewski =

Polish heavy metal musician (1960–2022)

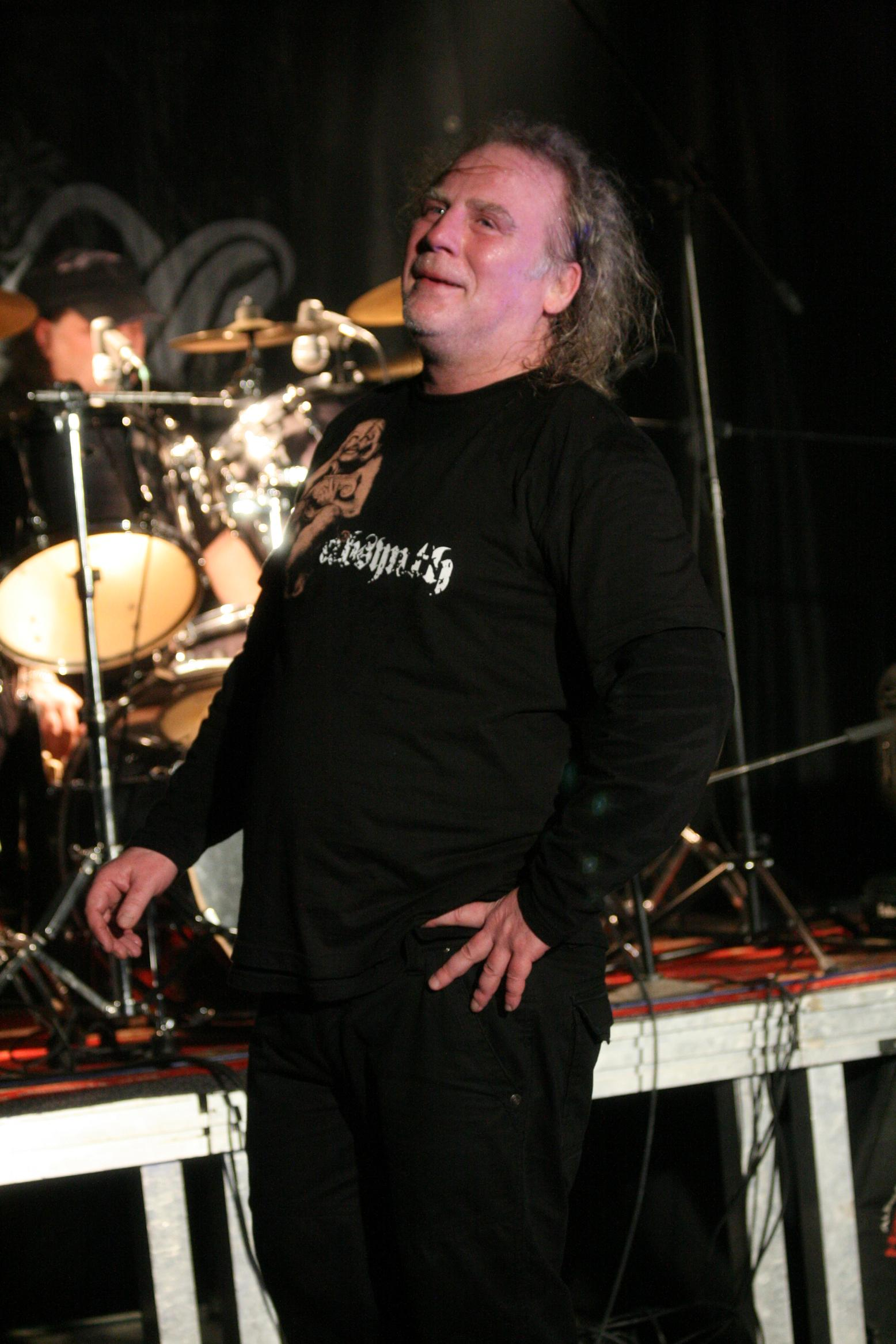
- Kostrzewski in 2010
- Born: 15 February 1960; Piekary Śląskie, Poland
- Died: 10 February 2022 (aged 61)
- Occupations: Musician, singer, songwriter
- Children: 4 (2 daughters, 2 sons)
- Musical career
- Genres: Thrash metal, heavy metal, black metal
- Instruments: Vocals, keyboards
- Years active: 1981–2022
- Label: Mystic Production
- Website: www.roman-kostrzewski.com.pl

Roman Kostrzewski's grave

Roman Kostrzewski (15 February 1960 – 10 February 2022) was a Polish heavy metal musician. He was the lead vocalist and songwriter of Kat until 2005. From then onwards, he focused on performing with Kat & Roman Kostrzewski. He also founded Alkatraz, another heavy metal band, with Valdi Moder in 2000.

== Life and career ==
Kostrzewski met KAT at the first edition of Silesian Rock Festival in Bytom. Shortly after that, he joined the band. They gained popularity and acceptance very quickly. In 1984 KAT was considered the favourite act at Jarocin festival. The tour with Hanoi Rocks quickly led the band to the top of Polish rock. In 1985 KAT released their debut album 666 and its English version Metal and Hell. After several spectacular shows, KAT released another album, Oddech Wymarłych Światów, and then, after several arguments between the members, KAT stopped playing. Kostrzewski afterwards participated in many musical projects with other Silesian rock musicians. After several changes in KAT (Jacek Regulski and Krzysztof Oset left), Kostrzewski and the band went on to record the album Bastard, which contains the hit song Łza dla cieniów minionych. The first day after release was an immense success where they played at Jarocin festival (the band sold over 4000 copies).

He died on 10 February 2022, at the age of 61.

== Discography ==
=== Solo albums ===
- Woda (2007)

=== Audio books ===
- Anton Szandor LaVey - The Satanic Bible (1995)
- Mark Twain - Letters from the Earth (1999)
