= Ułamek tarcia =

Studio album by Kaliber 44
- Released: February 13, 2016
- Recorded: 2013–2016
- Genre: Hip-hop
- Length: 48:54
- Label: Mystic Production
- Producer: Abradab

Kaliber 44 chronology
3:44 (2000)	Ułamek tarcia (2016)

Ułamek tarcia (IPA pronunciation: [uˈwamɛkˈtarʨ̑a], English: Fraction of Friction) is the fourth studio album by Polish hip-hop group Kaliber 44, released on February 12, 2016 on Mystic Production. It is the first album after a sixteen-year hiatus that the group took due to the Joka's move to United States.

It was entirely produced by Abradab and features several guest appearances by Rahim, Grubson and Gutek. The album was supported by two promotional singles: "Nieodwracalne zmiany" released on January 2, 2016 and "(Why Is It) Fresh" released on February 12, 2016. The third song "Razowy" featuring a singer Gutek was aired on February 11, 2016 on Polskie Radio Program III.

The album debuted at number 1 on OLiS having sold a few thousand hand-signed copies within a week and the pre-order period, and on March 23, 2016 Ułamek tarcia was certified as Platinum Record by Polish Society of the Phonographic Industry having sold over 50,000 copies.

== Background ==
In 2013, DJ Feel-X posted several pictures of him and other member of Kaliber 44. When fans started asking question, whether or not, the group had reunited, Abradab announced that they would give a performance during Open'er Festival 2013. A few days before the show an interview with DJ Feel-X was printed in Newsweek Polska. In the interview he said:

I have unused beats that I have been stashing away specially for Kaliber, but I do not want to release anything old. We're starting from the scratch. I am going to send Dab 50 new beats and I will ask him in three months how many lyrics he has already written to it.

In the same interview it was said that the album would be titled 4:44, yet it turned out to be only a working title. On July 5, 2013, the same day their performance took place, a video of a new album announcement saw the light of the day.

There were no information to be published since the interview on February 13, 2015, when Dab posted a message saying that the new album "is coming very soon". On January 2, 2016, the first single, called "Nieodwracalne zmiany" was released along with the official title for the album "Ułamek tarcia". In an interview for Akademickie Radio Kampus, Abradab said that DJ Feel-X left the group owing them too many misunderstandings. In a talk with Onet.pl, he elaborated on the Kaliber's breakup saying that DJ Feel-X had not wanted to be involved enough. He said, "I and Joka were working great. Most of the lyrics - over 80% - were written about August 2014. I made the beats in the first half of 2014 and in August I was ready to hit the studio. Feel-X did absolutely nothing and he denied everything. [...] After the year of working, it turned out there are 150 of my beats and only six his. [...] We had to make a decision of getting rid of DJ Feel-X from the group." The album's second single, called "(Why Is It) Fresh" was released on February 12, 2016.

== Reception ==
Professional ratings
Review scores
Source	Rating
CGM	4/5 stars
Interia.pl	8/10 stars
Musicbuk.pl	8/10 stars
Onet.pl	7/10 stars
T-Mobile Music	8/10 stars

The album received mostly positive reviews. Most of the reviewers were glad that the group had decided to come back after the hiatus and highlighted that Abradab was the "dominant person" on this album since he had produced all the beats and appeared on every song. Jacek Baliński of T-Mobile Music praised the sound on Ułamek Tarcia calling it "warm" comparing its mood to Da Beatminerz's productions.

Maciej Kaczmarski of Onet.pl praised the selection of guests and pointed out that all of them perfectly fit in. He criticized the lack of pun and word plays that "were on their best album W 63 minuty dookoła świata", though he recognized the lyrics from tracks "Superstary" and "Historia".

Karol Stefańczyk of CGM in his review emphasized that Joka is both a good and bad side of the album. He wrote that the fact that Joka had been inactive as a rapper was heard in his rhymes which sometimes were "clichéd". He praised though, that despite his "limited skills" he still had "potential worthy of a master of ceremonies".

Krzysztof Nowak of Interia.pl gave the album 8 out of 10 stars praising Abradab's production style and he emphasized its inspiration of New York sound. He also appreciated the naturalness of the lyrics pointing out that it is a thing that is increasingly less common in young emcees' rap.

== Track listing ==
All tracks produced by Abradab.

No.	Title	Writer(s)	Length
1.	"Intro / Wdech"		0:37
2.	"(Why Is It) Fresh"	Marcin Marten; Michał Marten	3:12
3.	"Rok podniesionych w górę rąk" (backing vocals Justyna Motylska)	Marcin Marten; Michał Marten	3:24
4.	"Piosenka Skit"		0:23
5.	"Towarzystwo" (featuring Grubson)	Marcin Marten; Tomasz Iwanca	4:16
6.	"Pewniak"	Marcin Marten	3:03
7.	"Boogie Skit"		0:23
8.	"Razowy" (featuring Gutek)	Marcin Marten; Michał Marten; Piotr Gutkowski	4:06
9.	"Kung Fu" (featuring Rahim)	Marcin Marten; Sebastian Salbert	3:48
10.	"Nieodwracalne zmiany"	Marcin Marten; Michał Marten	4:13
11.	"Miłość Skit"	Marcin Marten	1:24
12.	"Historia" (backing vocals Justyna Motylska & Gutek)	Marcin Marten; Michał Marten	3:00
13.	"Superstary"	Marcin Marten	2:53
14.	"Goń"	Marcin Marten; Michał Marten	3:57
15.	"Bounce Skit"		0:24
16.	"Bogusław Linda"	Marcin Marten; Michał Marten	4:06
17.	"CzerKaptur"	Marcin Marten	5:41
18.	"Outro / Wydech"		0:04
Total length:			48:54

Samples:

- "Intro / Wdech" contains samples of "Usłysz mój głos" by Kaliber 44.
- "(Why Is It) Fresh" contains samples of "Megamix II (Why Is It Fresh?)" by Grand Mixer DXT, "Noc całą", "Piosenka o G." and "Emisja spalin" by Abradab.
- "Rok podniesionych w górę rąk" contains samples of "Chwila" by Numer Raz, "Międzymiastowa", "Baku Baku ciężkie jest jak cut" by Kaliber 44, "Nie ma miejsca jak dom" by PiH and "Kochana Polsko" by O.S.T.R., "One Love" by Nas, "Work It" by Missy Elliott, "Hits from the Bong" by Cypress Hill and "La Di Da Di" by Doug E. Fresh & MC Ricky D.
- "Towarzystwo" contains samples of "Normalnie o tej porze" by Kaliber 44.
- "Razowy" contains samples of "Reprezentowice" by Centrala Katowice, "Robię Lans" by Slums Attack, "Here We Go (Live at the Funhouse)" by Run-DMC and "Nasze Dni" by Płomień 81.
- "Nieodwracalne zmiany" contains samples of "Bez wyjścia", "Brat nie ma już miłości dla mnie" and "Do boju zakon Marii" by Kaliber 44.
- "Superstary" contains samples of "Międzymiastowa" by Kaliber 44 and "Kolor purpury" by DonGURALesko.
- "Goń" contains samples of "38 Mln Ziomów" by Abradab.

== Personnel ==
Credits are adapted from the album's liner notes.

- Abradab - arranger, composer, lyrics, primary artist, producer, rap, recording engineer
- Tomasz Czulak - management
- Michał Dziekan / www.michaldziekan.com / - design, illustrations
- Maciej Dziekan / www.meandean.pl / - graphic design
- DJ Jaroz - arranger, composer, other instruments, scratching
- Grubson - featured artist
- Gutek - backing vocal, featured artist, guitar
- Joka - lyrics, primary artist, rap
- Tomasz Kubiak - guitar, recording engineer
- Justyna Motylska - backing vocals
- Mateusz Pawluś - composer, keyboards
- Rahim - featured artist
- Sebastian Witkowski - mastering, mixing
- Michał Tokaj - arranger

== Charts ==
=== Album ===
Year	Album	Chart positions
Year	Album	OLiS
2016	Ułamek tarcia	1

=== Singles ===
Year	Song	Chart positions	
Year	Song	LP3	UWM FM
2016	"Nieodwracalne zmiany"	7	2
2016	"(Why Is It) Fresh"	37	—
2016	"Historia"	35	—

== Certifications ==
Region	Certification	Certified units/sales
Poland (ZPAV)	Platinum	20,000^{‡}
^{‡} Sales+streaming figures based on certification alone.
