= Rahim (rapper) =

Rahim Sebastian Salbert
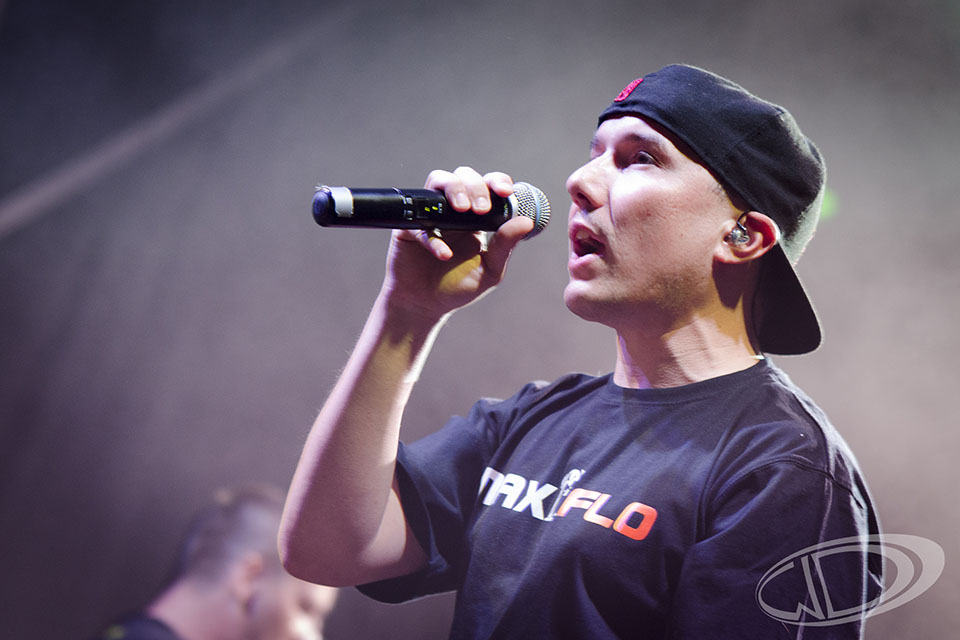

Background information
- Also known as: Rahim; Rah; Rahuene; Straho
- Born: November 17, 1978 (age 47); Katowice, Poland
- Origin: Mikołów, Poland
- Genres: Hip hop; alternative hip hop; dubstep
- Occupations: Rapper; record producer; entrepreneur
- Years active: 1994–present
- Labels: S.P. Records; Gigant Records; MaxFloRec

Sebastian Salbert (born November 17, 1978, in Katowice) better known by his stage name Rahim, is a Polish rapper, producer and entrepreneur. He is the owner of record company MaxFloRec, the former member of groups such as 3xKlan, MZD, Erka and Paktofonika. Since 2003 he has been the one half of a duo Pokahontaz which he creates with Fokus. He has released several albums under his alter ego Straho.

In 2001 he, along with his then group Paktofonika, received the Polish music award Fryderyk in Album of the year - hip-hop category for their album Kinematografia. In 2011, magazine Machina classified him at number 25 on list of "30 best Polish rappers".

He has a younger brother, Minx, who is a beatboxer and won Polish championship in beatbox in 2007.

== Biography ==
Sebastian Salbert was born on November 17, 1978, in Katowice, where he spent his early childhood. He moved out to Mikołów with his family later where he lives to this day. He began to be active as an artist in 1994 when he, along with Maczo, B.U.C and DJ Bambus, formed a group 3xKlan. In 1996, he produced two track for the biggest Hip-Hop band in Poland Kaliber 44's debut album Księga Tajemnicza. Prolog and rapped on a track "Psychodela". A year later, in 1997, 3xKlan released their debut and the only album Dom pełen drzwi which stylistically and lyrically was similar to Kaliber's debut. A few tracks from the album such as "Pozytywka" and "Łza wyobraźni" gained some popularity in Poland, peaking at Szczecińska Lista Przebojów chart. The album was also nominated for the Fryderyk award in category "Album of the year – rap & hip-hop". Subsequently, he was a part of short-lived projects eRKa and MZD.

In 1998, after the dissolution of 3xKlan, Rahim contacted with two rappers from Katowice: Magik and Fokus, and after a short period of time they created a new group Paktofonika. In April 2000, the group signed a contract with Gigant Records. On 18 December 2000, the debut album Kinematografia was released. Eight days after the release, Magik committed suicide by jumping through the window. One year after the release of Kinematografia, Rahim decided to co-produce the album Zawieszeni w czasie i przestrzeni of side-project Pijani Powietrzem. The album was finally released in 2002. In September 2002, Paktofonika's second and final studio album Archiwum kinematografii, containing old Magik's verses, was released. Meanwhile, he was working on his studio album Experyment: PSYHO which eventually was released on November 17, 2002, under his alter ego name Straho.

In 2003, Paktofonika performed their last show at Spodek in Katowice and on the same day Rahim, along with Fokus and DJ Bambus, announced the start of the group Pokahontaz. In 2004 he founded his own record label MaxFloRec which is the continuation of MaxFloStudio which was opened in 1998. In April 2005, the group released their first studio album Receptura. The album was promoted with singles "Wstrząs dla mas", "Nie1", and "Cyfroni" and it debuted at number 3 on Polish OLiS chart. In 2006 he produced the debut album Miraż for hip-hop group Projektor.

In 2007, Rahim started collaborating with L.U.C, an alternative hip hop and nu jazz artist, and on October 19, 2007, they released their joint album Homoxymoronomatura. The album was promoted with singles "Hemoglobina" and "Nibyminipocieszne Psychomarionety". On November, the same year, Rahim released, as previously under his nickname Straho, his second studio album DynamoL. The album features guest appearances from rappers like Abradab, Grubson and the group Projektor.

A year later, he performed in a play "Szepty", directed by Jack Burban at Polish Theatre in Wrocław. In the same year, he released Homoxymoronomatura Live - a live version of Homoxymoronomatura. In 2010, Rahim released his debut studio album under his normal pseudonym. The album, titled Podróże po amplitudzie, was finally released on March 5, 2010. On December 6, 2010, a remix album of the album, titled Amplifikacja was released. The remixes were produced by producers such as: O.S.T.R, DiNO, Vixen and others.

In 2012, Rahim, along with Fokus, were focused on working on Jesteś Bogiem, a movie, directed by Leszek Dawid, which tells a story of Paktofonika. The movie was released on September 21, 2012, and received highly positive reviews. On October 19, Pokahontaz released their second studio album Rekontakt which debuted at number 2 on Polish OLiS chart.

During 2019 December 12, during galle in Silesian Museum of Katowice, he has been awarded Honourous Medal "Valuable to Polish Culture".

== Discography ==
Studio albums

- Experyment: PSYHO (2002) (as Straho)
- DynamoL (2007) (as Straho)
- Podróże po amplitudzie (2010)
- Amplifikacja (2010)

Collaboration albums

- Homoxymoronomatura (2007) (with L.U.C)
- Homoxymoronomatura Live (2008) (with L.U.C)
- Optymistycznie (2015) (with Buka)
