= 3:44 =

Studio album by Kaliber 44
- Released: September 2, 2000
- Genre: Hip hop
- Length: 44:00
- Label: S.P. Records
- Producers: AbradAb, DJ Feel-X, Madmagister

Kaliber 44 chronology
W 63 minuty dookoła świata (1998)	3:44 (2000)	Ułamek tarcia (2016)

3:44 is the third studio album released by Polish hip-hop group Kaliber 44 released on September 2, 2000, by S.P. Records. The album was promoted with singles "Konfrontacje" and "Rutyny", having peaked at #1 on the Polish OLiS chart.3:44 earned the Fryderyk award for Album of the Year - rap/hip-hop. The album sold over 270,000 copies in Poland and became a huge commercial success.

== Track list ==
1. "Jeden" (One) -0:40
2. "Takie Jakie Jest" (feat. WSZ & CNE) (As It Is) - 3:46
3. "Konfrontacje" (Confrontations) -2:36
4. "Litery" (Letters) -3:01
5. "Baku Baku To Jest Skład" (feat. WSZ & CNE) (Baku Baku, That's The Crew) -5:37
6. "Dwa" (Two) 2:58
7. "Rutyny" (Routines) 3:04
8. "Wena" (Afflatus) 3:25
9. "Normalnie O Tej Porze" (Usually At This Time) 4:23
10. "Trzy" (Three) 1:18
11. "Co robisz" (What Are You Doing?) 3:34
12. "Masz Albo Myślisz O Nich Aż..." (You Either Have Or Think About Them Until...) 3:52
13. "Baku baku ciężki jest jak cut" (Baku Baku Is Heavy As A cut) 5:28
14. "Cztery" (Four) 2:16

== Charts ==
Chart performance for 3:44
Chart (2000)	Peak position
Polish Albums (ZPAV)	1
