= Scott Lawton =

Scott Lawton may refer to:

- Scott Lawton (boxer) (born 1976), English lightweight boxer
- Scott Lawton (conductor) (born 1960), Germany based American conductor
