= Czerwony album (Abradab album) =

Studio album by Abradab
- Released: June 8, 2004
- Recorded: 2002–2004
- Genre: Hip hop
- Length: 44:54
- Label: S.P. Records
- Producer: Abradab, Jajo, IGS, DJ 600V, Macuk, Banach

Abradab chronology
| Czerwony album (2004) | Emisja spalin (2005) |

Czerwony album (The Red Album) is a debut album by Polish hip-hop rapper and producer Abradab, released on June 8, 2004 by S.P. Records. The album featured artists such as Gutek, Tede, WSZ and CNE. The album peaked at #14 on the Polish OLiS chart. In 2004 Czerwony album earned the Fryderyk award for Album of the Year – rap/hip-hop.

== Track listing ==
| # | Tytuł | Translation | Producer | Time |
|---|---|---|---|---|
| 1 | "Domino" | "Domino" | Abradab | 1:15 |
| 2 | "Miasto jest nasze" (feat. Gutek) | "The City is Ours" | Abradab | 3:55 |
| 3 | "Poprawny wokal" | "Proper Vocal" | IGS | 2:39 |
| 4 | "Tu mam swój skład (Baku Baku)" (feat. WSZ & CNE) | "Here I Have My Crew (Baku Baku)" | Jajo | 5:06 |
| 5 | "Idealnie" | "Ideally" | Abradab | 2:28 |
| 6 | "Piosenka o G." | "Song about G" | DJ 600V | 2:04 |
| 7 | "Rapowe ziarno 2 (Szyderap)" (feat. Gutek) | "Rap Seed 2 (Szyderap)" | Macuk | 4:04 |
| 8 | "... (Indios Bravos RMX)" | "... (Indios Bravos RMX)" | Banach | 4:25 |
| 9 | "Noc całą" (feat. Frenchman) | "All Night Long" | Abradab | 4:19 |
| 10 | "Lubiędobre" (feat. Gutek) | "Ilikegood" | IGS | 3:22 |
| 11 | "Państwo jest nasze" (feat. Gutek, Tede) | "The State is Ours" | Abradab | 3:59 |
| 12 | "Chobcy" | | Jajo | 3:13 |
| 13 | "..." | "..." | Abradab | 4:05 |
