= Kinematografia =

Studio album by Paktofonika
- Released: December 18, 2000
- Recorded: 1998–2000
- Genre: Conscious hip hop, alternative hip hop
- Length: 70:31
- Label: Gigant Records
- Producer: Magik, Fokus, Rahim, Beny, Paul D., Jajonasz, Kipper

Paktofonika chronology
| Kinematografia (2000) | Archiwum kinematografii (2002) |

Kinematografia is the debut studio album by Polish hip-hop trio Paktofonika, released on December 18, 2000, on Gigant Records. The material for the project was being gathered for over two years from 1998 to 2000. The album was promoted with a single "Ja to ja", released on November 1, 2000.

The album peaked at number 2 on the Polish OLiS chart, almost 12 years after its original release. Kinematografia received Fryderyk award in "Best hip-hop album" category. T-Mobile Music placed the track "Chwile ulotne" on the list of "120 most important Polish hip-hop songs".

8 days after the album was released Magik committed suicide by jumping out of the window of his apartment situated on the ninth floor of the building, in Katowice. His death was extensively commented on media and in hip-hop community. As of 2012 the album has sold 65,000 copies in Poland.

== Background ==
After Magik's departure from Kaliber 44, and Rahim's departure from 3xKlan, Fokus wanted to found a new group so he asked both of them to join him. In October 1998, the group started to work on first songs for their new album. Those songs were: "Priorytety", "Ja to ja", and "Gdyby...". In the same year, DJ Bambus became the group official DJ, and Sot was a beatboxer. The group sent their demo tracks to a few record labels and initially the only record label that was interested in releasing their album was RRX, in which Paktofonika signed a contract. Shortly after that, the deal was broken due to the misunderstanding between the label and the group. On spring 2000, the group signed a deal with Gigant Records. Rahim commented that fact later stating:

Initially, we were to release "Kinematografia" on RRX. […] Yet we were constantly led by the nose and things kept stalling. Later, we met Gustaw Szepke, the founder of Gigant Records. He had completely different attitude. We talked about our music, our art, not about things to change so the album was more commercially successful and got more buyers. […] Current deal is the best. I give them the finished material - and the label does the rest.

Kinematografia was finally released on December 18, 2000. 8 days later, on December 26, 2000, Magik committed suicide by jumping out of the window from his apartment. On September 21, 2012, the fabular movie about Paktofonika titled Jesteś Bogiem was released and its popularity caused that Rahim and Fokus decided to repress the album. On December 9, 2012, almost twelve years since its release, the album peaked at number 2 on Polish OLiS chart.

== Reception and accolades ==
Professional ratings
Review scores
| Source | Rating |
|---|---|
| Porcys | 7.5/10 |

Upon its release, Kinematografia received favorable reviews from most music critics. Borys Dejnarowicz of Porcys, an independent Polish music portal, rated that album on 7.5 out of 10 points stating that he "doesn't know if there has been created something like that before. Maybe so, yet I really doubt it. Kinematografia is a dark, poetic, impressionistic and surrealistic album.". He also added that "due to Magik, Fokus, and Rahim, Polish hip-hop finally has an artistic album in every inch."

Kinematografia has been marked, both by music critics and hip-hop fans, as one of the most iconic Polish hip-hop album In 2012, a journalist of Gazeta Wyborcza has placed the album on a list of "10 important album of Polish hip-hop" calling it "legendary album". On 2014, the larger Polish web portal Onet.pl announced an Internet poll on the best album of 25 years of independency in Poland. It was arranged due to the 25th anniversary of Polish first legislative election, and among nearly 30 thousand votes, Kinematografia gained 3320 votes (12,6% of all votes) and placed at number 1.

On 2012, due to the 20th anniversary of Polish hip-hop, T-Mobile Music placed "Chwile ulotne" on the list of "120 most important Polish hip-hop songs" and Piotr Zdziarstek of Popkiller, one of the largest hip-hop portal in Poland, named the song "Jestem Bogiem" a "real anthem which everyone should be familiar with".

== Track listing ==
| No. | Title | Writer(s) | Producer(s) | Length |
|---|---|---|---|---|
| 1. | "Na mocy paktu" | P. Łuszcz; W. Alszer; S. Salbert | Rahim | 1:00 |
| 2. | "Priorytety" | Łuszcz; Alszer; Salbert | Fokus; Magik | 5:12 |
| 3. | "Gdyby..." | Łuszcz; Alszer; Salbert | Magik | 3:22 |
| 4. | "Ja to ja" (featuring Gutek) | Łuszcz; Alszer; Salbert; P. Gutowski | Jajonasz | 4:59 |
| 5. | "Powierzchnie tnące" | Alszer | Fokus | 3:35 |
| 6. | "ToNieMY" | Łuszcz; Alszer; Salbert | Magik | 3:46 |
| 7. | "Popatrz (uliczny reportaż z dworca)" (featuring Sot) | M. Zięba | Paktofonika | 2:16 |
| 8. | "Chwile ulotne" | Łuszcz; Alszer; Salbert | Fokus | 4:37 |
| 9. | "Wc [Sot]" | Łuszcz | Rahim | 0:49 |
| 10. | "Nowiny" | Łuszcz | Magik | 3:44 |
| 11. | "Nie ma mnie dla nikogo" | Łuszcz; Alszer; Salbert | Fokus | 6:00 |
| 12. | "Jestem Bogiem" | Łuszcz; Alszer; Salbert | Kipper | 3:22 |
| 13. | "Lepiej być nie może" | Łuszcz; Alszer; Salbert | Fokus | 4:58 |
| 14. | "Rób co chcesz" | Łuszcz; Alszer; Salbert | Beny | 5:47 |
| 15. | "W moich kręgach" | Salbert | Rahim | 4:00 |
| 16. | "2 kilo" (featuring Dike, Kams, Laki, LO & OnAnOn) | Łuszcz; Alszer; Salbert; D. Uchegbu; E. Polychronidis | Paul D | 11:05 |
| Total length: | | | | 70:31 |
