= Motion Trio =

Polish musical group

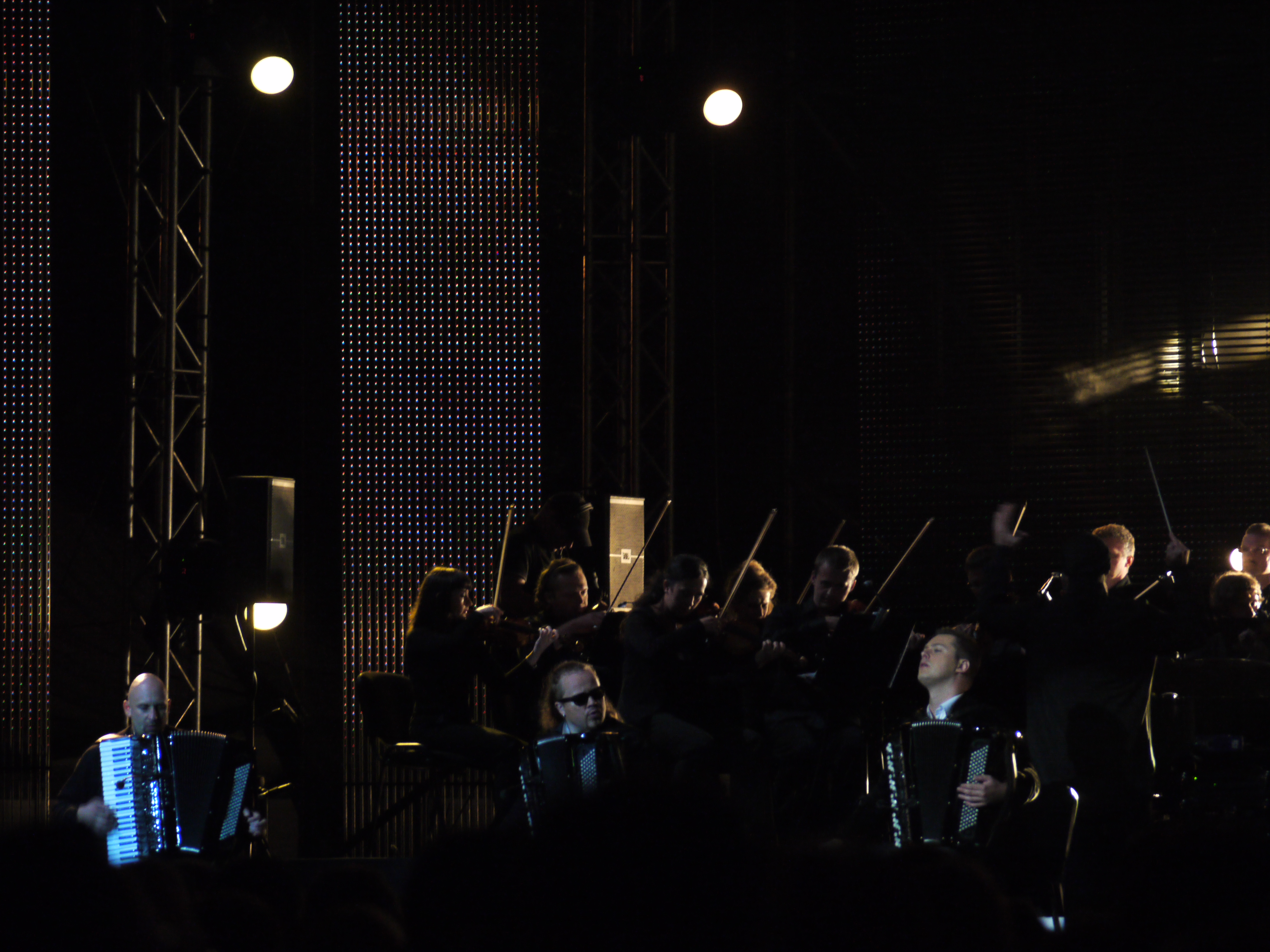
- Motion Trio in 2010

Background information
- Origin: Poland
- Genres: Crossover
- Years active: 1996–present
- Labels: http://akordeonus.com
- Members: Janusz Wojtarowicz; Marcin Gałażyn; Paweł Baranek
- Website: www.motiontrio.com

Motion Trio is a Polish accordion trio founded in 1996 by Janusz Wojtarowicz.

The band has performed on six continents and in forty two countries: Austria, Belgium, Belarus, Brazil, Bulgaria, Czech Republic, China, Egypt, Estonia, Finland, France, Great Britain, Greece, Spain, Ireland, Iceland, Israel, Japan, Canada, Lithuania, Luxembourg, Latvia, Germany, Kazachstan, Moldova, the Netherlands, New Caledonia, Norway, Poland, Portugal, Russia, Singapore, Slovakia, South Korea, Switzerland, Sweden, Taiwan, Turkey, Ukraine, USA, Hungary and Italy.

== Discography ==
- 1998: "Cry"
- 1999: "Pictures"
- 2001: "Pictures From The Street" - Best Polish Recording 2000, Grand Prix at the Polish Music Industry, Best Debut year 2000 in Poland - Jazzi Magazine, Deutsche Shallplatten Kritik and "Gus Viseur","Musical Discovery of the Year" in France, 2005.
- 2002: "Play-Station"
- 2003: "Pictures From The Street" Reedition
- 2004: "Live in Vienna Sacrum & Profanum"
- 2007: "Metropolis"
- 2009: "Michael Nyman & Motion Trio"
- 2010: "Chopin" Live at La Folle Journee - The Best Album in category Classical Music, HI-FI & Music
- 2011: "Brahms and Liszt and..." Live at La Folle Journee
- 2012: "Musorgsky.Prokofiev.Shostakovich.Khachaturian"
- 2013: "Nic Się Nie Stalo" L.U.C and Motion Trio - Mateusz Trójki - Award of the Polish Radio III, Hit of 2013; "Iluzji Łąka" by radio TOK FM audience vote
- 2013: "City of Harmony" Motion Trio & L.U.C
- 2013: "Polonium"
- 2018: "Accordion Stories"

=== Collaborative albums ===
Title	Album details	Peak chart positions
Title	Album details	POL
Nic się nie stało (with L.U.C)	Released: 17 April 2013; Label: L.U.C/Motion Trio/EMI Music Poland; Formats: CD, digital download	25
City of Harmony (with L.U.C)	Released: 25 May 2013; Label: L.U.C/Motion Trio/EMI Music Poland; Formats: CD	—
"—" denotes a recording that did not chart or was not released in that territory.

== Awards ==
Motion Trio have won many international awards including:

- "Cobalt Muse" – Award of the Foundation "Different Tones" (2009)
- "Mateusze 2013" - Music Award of the Polish Radio Channel 3 for the Motion Trio and L.U.C - masterful combination of two musical worlds, which resulted in two albums, "NOTHING HAPPENED" and "CITY OF HARMONY"
- "Best Film Music" 2016 - 41 Film Festival in Gdynia for Janusz Wojtarowicz and Motion Trio (Janusz Wojtarowicz, Paweł Baranek, Marcin Gałażyn) for the music for the film "Szczęście Świata" dir. Michał Rosa

== Motion Trio works with ==
Krzysztof Penderecki - "Ciaccona" from Polish Requiem (the version for three accordions) - world premiere in New York, Carnegie Hall in 2008

- Oratorio "Seven gates of Jerusalem" part III "De profundis" (version for three accordions) - world premiere "Skirball Center" in Los Angeles 2007

Henryk Mikołaj Górecki - "Three Works in the Old Style" (version for three accordions) - world premiere in New York, Carnegie Hall in 2008

- "Concerto for harpsichord (or piano) and string orchestra op. 40" (version for piano and three accordions).

The premiere of the composer's 80th birthday, Warsaw Philharmonic in 2013 (Leszek Możdżer and Motion Trio)

Wojciech Kilar - "Orawa" (in the version for three accordions) - world premiere in New York Carnegie Hall in 2008

Jerzy Maksymiuk - "Arbor vitae II" for a soprano, an accordion trio and a symphonic orchestra 2018

Jan A.P. Kaczmarek - "Koncert Jankiela" (version for three accordions and orchestra)- premiere on International Film and Music Festival "Transatlantic" (Poznań - Poland 2012)

Michael Nyman - MGV "Musique a Grand Vitesse" (for three accordions) with Michael Nyman Band - world premiere "Barbican Centre" in London 2009

- "Kino" (for three accordions) with Michael Nyman Band - world premiere The Polish Baltic Frédéric Chopin Philharmonic 2010

Viacheslav Siemionov

- "Toccata Barbaro" (for three accordions) 2014 - world premiere - International Festival of Cracow Composers 2015

Other Artists: Bobby McFerrin, Leszek Możdżer, Krzesimir Dębski, Małgorzata Walewska, Triloki Gurtu, Michał Urbaniak, Tomasz Stańko, Zohar Fresco, Mariusz Patyra, Piotr Orzechowski (Pianohooligan), Atom String Quartete, Marta Ptaszyńska, Zbigniew Bargielski, Marcel Chyrzyński, Maciej Zieliński, Łukasz Targosz, L.U.C, Józef Skrzeki, Anna Maria Jopek, Kuba Badach, Zbigniew Wodecki, KROKE, ANAWA, Marcin Wyrostek, Lidia Jazgar, Joanna Kulig, Ania Rusowicz, The ThreeX, Intars Busulis, Sylvester Mateev, Aram Rustamyants

Orchestras: Orkiestra Filharmonii Narodowej w Warszawie, WDR Rundfunkorchester Köln, Deutsches Filmorchester Babelsberg, Sinfonietta Riga, Sinfonietta Cracovia, Rio de Janeiro Orquestra do Teatro Municipal, Orkiestra Filharmonii Łódzkiej, Orkiestra Polskiej Filharmonii Bałtyckiej, Orkiestra Filharmonii Pomorskiej, Orkiestra Filharmoników Szczecińskich, Orkiestra Filharmonii Warmińsko-Mazurskiej, Orkiestra Kameralna "AUKSO", Elbląska Orkiestra Kameralna, Orkiestra L’Autunno, Przemyska Orkiestra Kameralna, Hanseatica Chamber Orchestra (Gdańsk), Ensemble "KONTRASTE" (Nürnberg), Neue Lausitzer Philharmonie

Conductors: Jerzy Maksymiuk, Marek Moś, Radosław Labahua, Piotr Sułkowski, Krzesimir Dębski, Mirosław Jacek Błaszczyk, Ewa Strusińska, Szymon Bywalec, Tomasz Chmiel, Maciej Koczur, Adam Banaszak, Scott Lawtonon, Ernst van Tielem, Normund Sne, Massimiliano Caldi, Jérôme Pillement

And with: Anna Dymna, Krzysztof Orzechowski - "The Salon of Poetry", Andrzej Seweryn - "Mounsieur Pichon" - based on the text by Salome Broussky (Premiere: 19 October 2010 in the Comedie Francaise in Paris, music by F. Chopin and the Motion Trio), Piotr Cieplak - "The Italian Straw Hat" - music by Janusz Wojtarowicz, performed by the MT, Jerzy Grałek - "Jesienin" - music by the Motion Trio, Jerzy Skolimowski – the MT starred in the "Essential Killing" (award winner at the film festivals in Venice, Mar Del Plata and Gdynia), Jacek Sroka - concert project "Sroka in Motion" combines music of MT and painting of Jacek Sroka.

The band granted permission for the use of their pieces of music in the following films:

One Hour Summer (USA 2008)

Laura (POLAND 2010)

Życie (POLAND 2002)

as well as in many other historical and feature films all over the world.

The band made various recordings for the following TV stations: Arte, ZDF, WDR, France 3, Mezzo, TVP, TVP Kultura, as well as for several radio stations.
