= Pokahontaz =

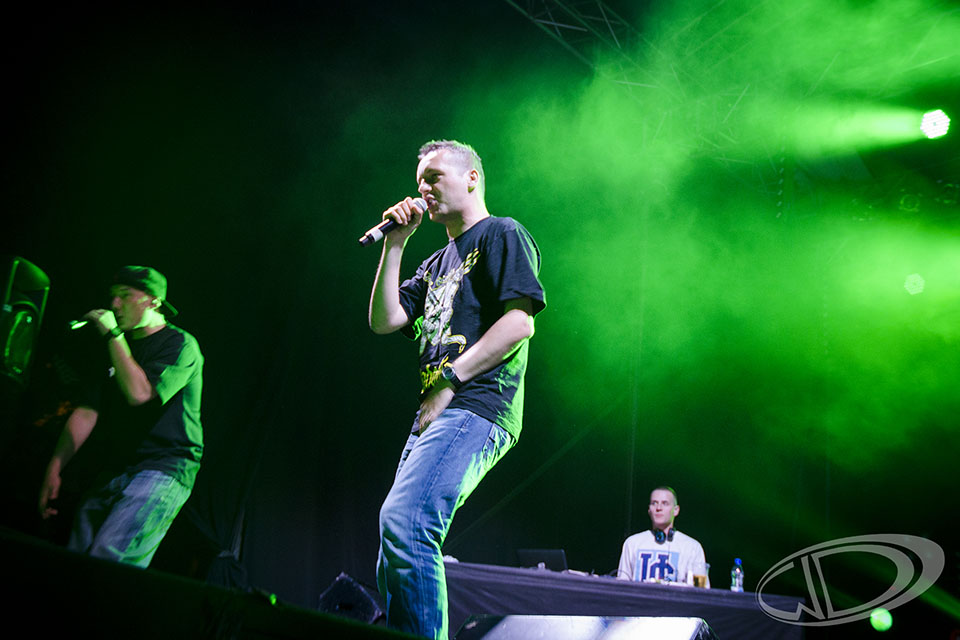
- Pokahontaz, 2013

Background information
- Origin: Katowice, Poland
- Genres: Hip hop
- Years active: 2003–present
- Labels: Kreska Records, MaxFloRec, FoAna
- Members: Rahim; Fokus; DJ Bambus

Pokahontaz is a Polish hip-hop group, founded in 2003 in Katowice by Rahim, Fokus and DJ Bambus.

== Discography ==
=== Studio albums ===
Title	Album details	Peak chart positions	Sales	Certifications
Title	Album details	POL	Sales	Certifications
Receptura	Released: 5 April 2005; Label: Kreska Records/Pomaton EMI	3	POL: 6,000+	
Rekontakt	Released: 26 October 2012; Label: MaxFloRec & FoAna/Mystic Production	2	POL: 15,000+	POL: Gold
Reversal	Released: 20 August 2014; Label: MaxFloRec/Mystic Production	2		
REkolekcja	Released: 21 August 2016; Label: MaxFloRec	14		
REset	Released: 1 December 2017; Label: MaxFloRec	13		
Renesans	Released: 28 June 2019; Label: MaxFloRec	2		
"—" denotes a recording that did not chart or was not released in that territory.

=== Music videos ===
Year	Title	Directed	Album	Ref.
2004	"Wstrząs dla mas"	44PR	Receptura	
2005	"Nie1"	Xawery Tatarkiewicz	Receptura	
2005	"Za szybcy się wściekli" (featuring: Miuosh, Cichy)	Xawery Tatarkiewicz	Receptura	
2008	Rahim – "Cyfroni" (featuring: Pokahontaz)	Przedmarańcza	DynamoL	
2012	"Róża wiatrów"	Przedmarańcza	Rekontakt	
2012	"Niemiłość" (featuring: Pezet)	Holeinmoon	Rekontakt	
2013	"Pompuj pompuj"	2nd Door On The Left	Rekontakt	
2013	"Stroboskopy"	Xawery Tatarkiewicz	Rekontakt	
2014	"Habitat"	AG Studio	Reversal	
