= Paktofonika =

Polish hip hop group

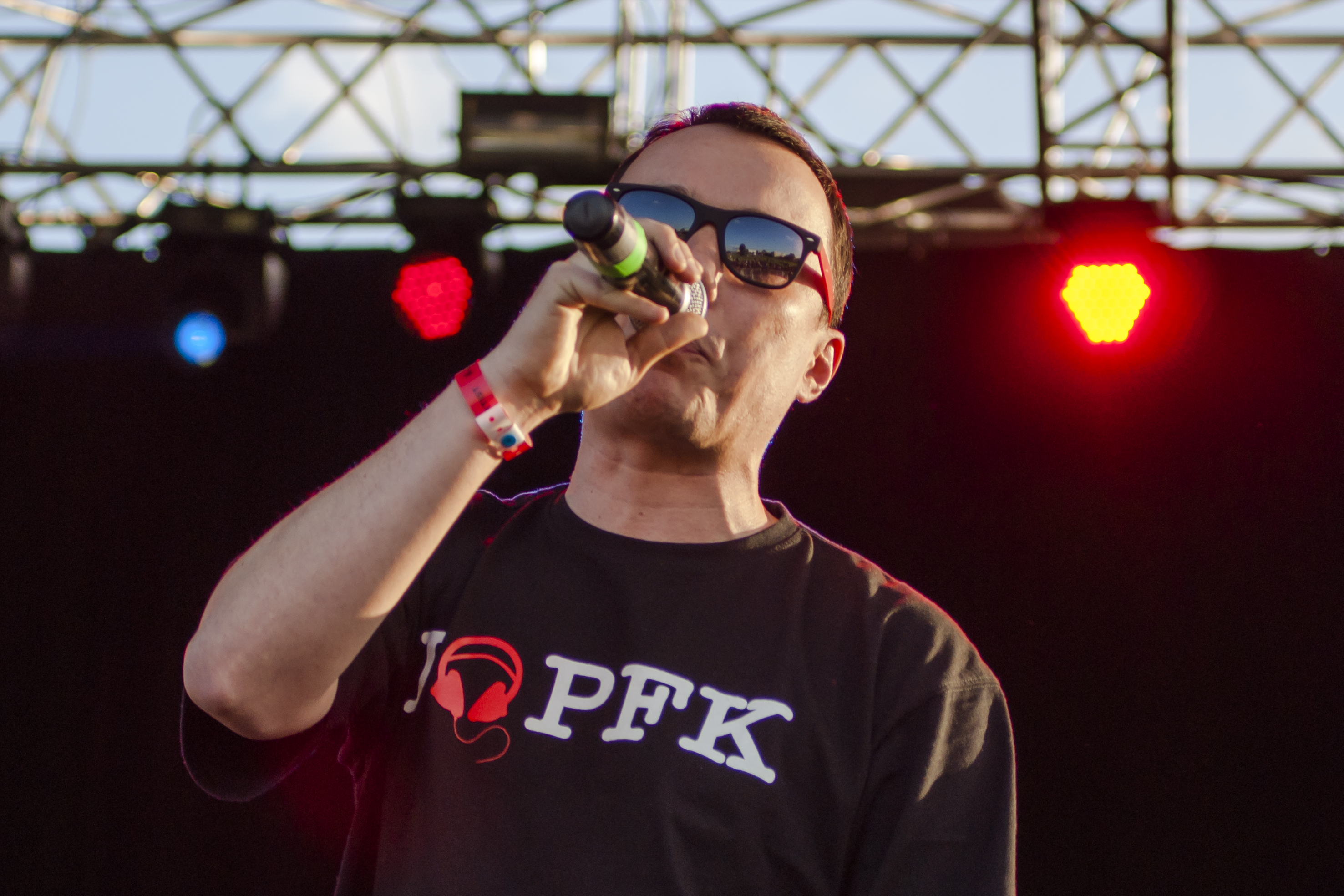
- Rahim on Ursynalia festival in 2014 with PFK t-shirt

Background information
- Also known as: PFK
- Origin: Katowice, Poland
- Genres: hip hop
- Years active: 1998–2003; 2022–present
- Label: Gigant Records
- Past members: Magik (1998–2000); Fokus (1998–2003, 2022–present); Rahim (1998–2003, 2022–present)

Paktofonika is a Polish hip hop group from Katowice and Mikołów, which debuted with the album Kinematografia in 2000. The name Paktofonika comes from the words pakt (pact) and fonika (phonics), from which derives the idea of "A pact made alongside sounds from a speaker", created by band's founders, Magik and Rahim.

== Members ==
- Piotr "Magik" Łuszcz (1978–2000) – formerly of Kaliber 44
- Wojciech "Fokus" Alszer (born 1980) – ex Kwadrat Skład, since 2004 a member of Pokahontaz
- Sebastian "Rahim" Salbert (born 1978) – ex 3xKlan, Erka, since 2004 a member of Pokahontaz

== History ==
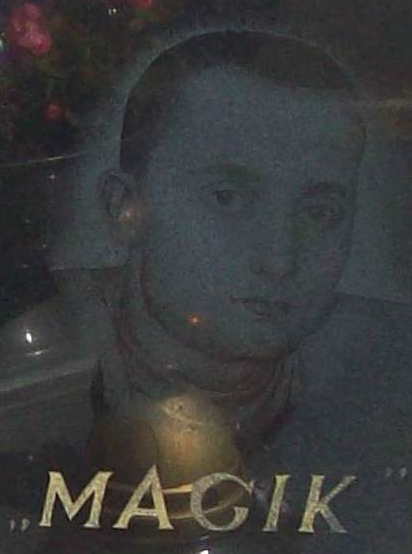
The portrait of Piotr "Magik" Łuszcz on his gravestone.

=== Formation (1998–1999) ===
Paktofonika began when Magik left Kaliber 44 after their second album, W 63 Minuty Dookoła Świata (1998). Rahim left his group 3xKlan at around the same time, and formed Paktofonika with Magik and Fokus in 1998. Their first songs, written in October 1998, were "Priorytety", "Ja to Ja" and "Gdyby". Two new members joined Paktofonika, DJ Bambus on turntables, and Sot as a beatboxer.

=== Kinematografia and Magik's death (2000) ===
In the spring of 2000, the group signed a contract with Gigant Records. In the summer of that year, the group was in Witten, Germany, where they recorded their song "2 Kilo" with German artists. On 18 December 2000, Paktofonika's first album entitled Kinematografia was released. Eight days later, on 26 December at 6.15 a.m., Magik committed suicide by jumping from the window of his ninth-floor apartment.

=== Aftermath (2001–2003) ===
After Magik's death, the group continued performing with DJ Bambus and Sot for some time. In concerts, they were using previously recorded material of Magik's vocals. In May 2001, a sample of Paktofonika's song "Ja to Ja", sung by reggae/hip-hop artist Piotr 'Gutek' Gutkowski, was used in an ice-cream commercial without the group members' permission, but with the knowledge of Gigant Records.

In September 2002, Paktofonika's farewell album was released. Archiwum Kinematografii contained studio outtakes from the group's first album, and two songs recorded later without Magik, "Ja to ja 2 (dokładnie tak!)" and "W pełnej gotowości". In December 2002, it was announced that on 21 March 2003 the group would give its last performance under the name Paktofonika in Spodek, Katowice. The concert was recorded and released as Pożegnalny koncert on 26 April 2004 through Universal Music Poland.

Rahim and Fokus continue to work on other projects, such as PFK Company and Pokahontaz.

=== The official comeback of Paktofonika (2022–present) ===
In 2022, Fokus and Rahim announced their return to concerts as Paktofonika, wanting to celebrate the 22nd anniversary of the Kinematografia album and the 20th anniversary of the Archiwum kinematografii. Since 2022, many concerts have been organized throughout Poland and also in other countries (e.g. United States, Canada, Netherlands, United Kingdom, Ireland, Norway and Iceland)

== Legacy ==
Jesteś Bogiem, a film inspired by Paktofonika's story and directed by Leszek Dawid, was released on 7 May 2012. It received critical acclaim and won several awards, including two Polish Film Awards (out of ten nominations) and 6 Złote Lwy awards (out of 7 nominations) at Gdynia Film Festival. The film was also a box-office hit, with 1,366,293 viewers within its first month in theaters, and became the highest-selling Polish film of the year. The film title (You are God) refers to the title of Paktofonika's most popular song, "Jestem Bogiem" ("I am God"). The film was met mainly with critical reception due to the downplaying of the role of the Kaliber 44 group and the distortion of facts about the Magik (the film shows that after leaving Kaliber 44, he did not have much money, and in reality he had much more income from it than from paktofonika, and creating music in paktofonika wasn't as hard as it shows in the movie).

== Discography ==
=== Studio albums ===
Title	Album details	Peak chart positions	Sales	Certifications
Title	Album details	POL	Sales	Certifications
Kinematografia	Released: 18 December 2000; Label: Gigant Records	2	75,000+	
Archiwum kinematografii	Released: 25 September 2002; Label: Gigant Records	6		

=== Extended plays ===
Year	Album details	Peak chart positions
Year	Album details	POL
2001	Jestem Bogiem: Released: 7 June 2001; Label: Gigant Records	30

=== Live albums ===
Year	Album details
2004	Pożegnalny koncert: Released: 26 April 2004; Label: Universal Music Poland; Format: VHS, DVD

=== Other releases ===
Year	Album details	Peak chart positions	Sales	Certifications	Notes
Year	Album details	POL	Sales	Certifications	Notes
2012	Muzyka z filmu Jesteś Bogiem: Released: 5 October 2012; Label: Universal Music Poland	6	10,000+		Jesteś Bogiem original soundtrack, produced by Fokus and Rahim. Contains new versions of Paktofonika's songs, instrumental tracks by DJ 5:CET, and versions of songs "Nowiny", "Priorytety" and "Lepiej być nie może" recorded by actors who played group members in the film: Marcin Kowalczyk, Tomasz Schuchardt and Dawid Ogrodnik.
