= W 63 minuty dookoła świata =

Studio album by Kaliber 44
- Released: March 2, 1998
- Genre: Hip hop
- Length: 63:00
- Label: S.P. Records

Kaliber 44 chronology
Księga Tajemnicza. Prolog (1996)	W 63 minuty dookoła świata (1998)	3:44 (2000)

W 63 minuty dookoła świata (Polish: Around the world in 63 minutes) is the second studio album by Polish hip-hop group Kaliber 44 released March 2, 1998 on S.P. Records. The album went platinum according to ZPAV, and was nominated to the Fryderyk award for best hip-hop album of the year. The hip-hop group members include Joka and AbradAb, Magik and DJ Feel-X.

== Track list ==
1. "Suczka" (Bitch)
2. "Gruby czarny kot on przebiegł nam drogę, a chuj mu w dupę nawet w 13 piątek" (A Black Fat Cat, He Crossed Our Way, And Fuck Him In the Ass Even on Friday the 13th)
3. "Kontem O.K." (Corner of the Eye) (wordplay on the pronunciation word O.K. and Polish word "oko" meaning eye)
4. "Film" (The Trip)
5. "Pierwszy Kot" (The First Cat)
6. "Dziedzina" (The Branch)
7. "C.Z.K." (M.o.S.) (Short for "Man of Stone")
8. "DJ Feel-X"
9. "Dziękuję Moim MC" (I Thank My MCs)
10. "Może Tak, Może Nie - Kobi RMX" (Maybe So, Maybe Not - Kobi RMX)
11. "Międzymiastowa" (Intercity Call)
12. "Intro Dab"
13. "Abradababra" (wordplay on the rapper name Abradab and the word Abracadabra)
14. "Psy" (Dogs)
15. "Drugi Kot" (The Second Cat)
16. "Może Tak, Może Nie" (Maybe So, Maybe not)
17. "Jeszcze Więcej MC" (Even More MCs)
18. "0:22"
