= Magik (rapper) =

Polish rapper (1978-2000)

Background information
- Born: Piotr Łuszcz; 18 March 1978; Jelenia Góra, Jelenia Góra Voivodeship, Polish People's Republic
- Died: 26 December 2000 (aged 22) Katowice, Silesian Voivodeship, Poland
- Genre: Hip hop
- Occupations: Rapper, songwriter
- Years active: 1992–2000
- Labels: S.P. Records, Gigant Records

Piotr Łuszcz (18 March 1978 – 26 December 2000), also known as Magik (pol. Magician), was a Polish rapper and record producer. From 1993 to 1998, he was a member of the Polish hip-hop group Kaliber 44. After he left Kaliber 44, he formed the group Paktofonika with Sebastian Salbert (stage name Rahim) and Wojciech Alszer (stage name Fokus).

Łuszcz committed suicide on 26 December 2000 around 6.15 a.m. by jumping from the window of his ninth-floor apartment. He was pronounced dead at a local hospital at around 6.45 a.m., leaving behind his wife Justyna and their 3-year-old son Filip.

== Discography ==
Kaliber 44

- Usłysz Nasze Demo! (1994) (demo)
- Demo 1995r. (1995) (demo)
- Księga Tajemnicza. Prolog (1996)
- W 63 minuty dookoła świata (1998)

Paktofonika

- Kinematografia (2000)
- Archiwum Kinematografii (2002)
