= Scott Lawton (conductor) =

American conductor based in Germany (born 1960)

Scott Lawton (born 1960 in New Castle, Pennsylvania) is an American conductor based in Germany.

== Career and education ==
Lawton has served as the Principal Conductor of the Deutsches Filmorchester Babelsberg in Potsdam since 1999. His activities with the Filmorchester include performances of silent films, studio recordings for film and television productions and orchestral concerts. Since 2005 he has served as conductor of the Landespolizeiorchester Nordrhein-Westfalen, a professional symphonic wind orchestra based in Wuppertal. From 2004 to 2009 he also served as music director of the summer festival in Bad Gandersheim.

During his high school years, Lawton attended programs of the Pennsylvania Governor's School for the Arts and the summer program of the Berklee School of Music. His university studies led to degrees from the Oberlin Conservatory and the University of Cincinnati. For several summers in the mid-80s, he conducted at the Ohio Light Opera, assisting James Paul with Gilbert and Sullivan and other productions and recordings. Following his Cincinnati studies, he worked with Vincent Persichetti in preparing the world premiere in Philadelphia of the opera "The Sibyl". During a subsequent year of graduate studies at the Louisiana State University, he assisted opera singer Martina Arroyo as she began her teaching career.

Prior to working with the Filmorchester in the late '90s he was staff conductor at the opera houses in Saarbrücken, Bielefeld and Trier. He also led major musical productions of The Phantom of the Opera, Les Misérables and 42nd Street in Vienna, Miss Saigon in Stuttgart, Cyrano in Amsterdam and Chicago in Berlin, Munich, Basel and Düsseldorf. At the Wiener Kammeroper he conducted productions of The Marriage of Figaro and Rigoletto. He conducted in 2007 a new production of Les Misérables for the opera house in Meiningen, Germany.

An advocate of genre-crossing symphonic projects, he has worked closely together with Omara Portuondo and the Buena Vista Social Club, Udo Lindenberg, Karat, Jon Lord and Joy Denalane. With Scorpions' "Moment of Glory" symphonic program he has toured Russia and the Baltic countries. In 2005 he led a tour of symphonic film music with UFA film star Johannes Heesters. He has conducted the annual televised José Carreras Benefit Gala in Leipzig since 2000. A series of crossover concerts in Potsdam's Nikolaisaal recently featured projects with the Motion Trio, Mísia, Besh O Drom and Mousse T. He led the final concert of the 2007 Potsdam Sanssouci Music Festival, which was subsequently broadcast on 3sat throughout Europe.

As a guest conductor he has led the Kölner Rundfunkorchester, Gürzenich Orchestra Köln, Wuppertal Sinfonie Orchester, Saarländisches Staatsorchester, the Meininger Hofkapelle, the Orchester of the Ludwigsburger Schlossfestspiele and the Brandenburgisches Staatsorchester.

He has led premiere performances of orchestral works by Franz Waxman (reconstruction of the original music to the film "Liliom"), Sir Malcolm Arnold ("Ballade for Piano and Orchestra" from "Stolen Face") und Ashley Irwin (new live soundtrack to Hitchcock's "The Lodger").

He has composed the music for several productions at the summer festival in Bad Gandersheim: 1) "Mozart in Manhattan", a chamber opera about Mozart's librettist Lorenzo da Ponte after he became a resident of New York City, 2) "Wenn Ärzte lieben", a musical theater parody of the Romance novel in a medical milieu, and 3) incidental music to a new productions of Astrid Lindgren's Emil i Lönneberga and L. Frank Baum's The Wonderful Wizard of Oz.
