= L.U.C =

Polish manager, rapper and producer (born 1981)

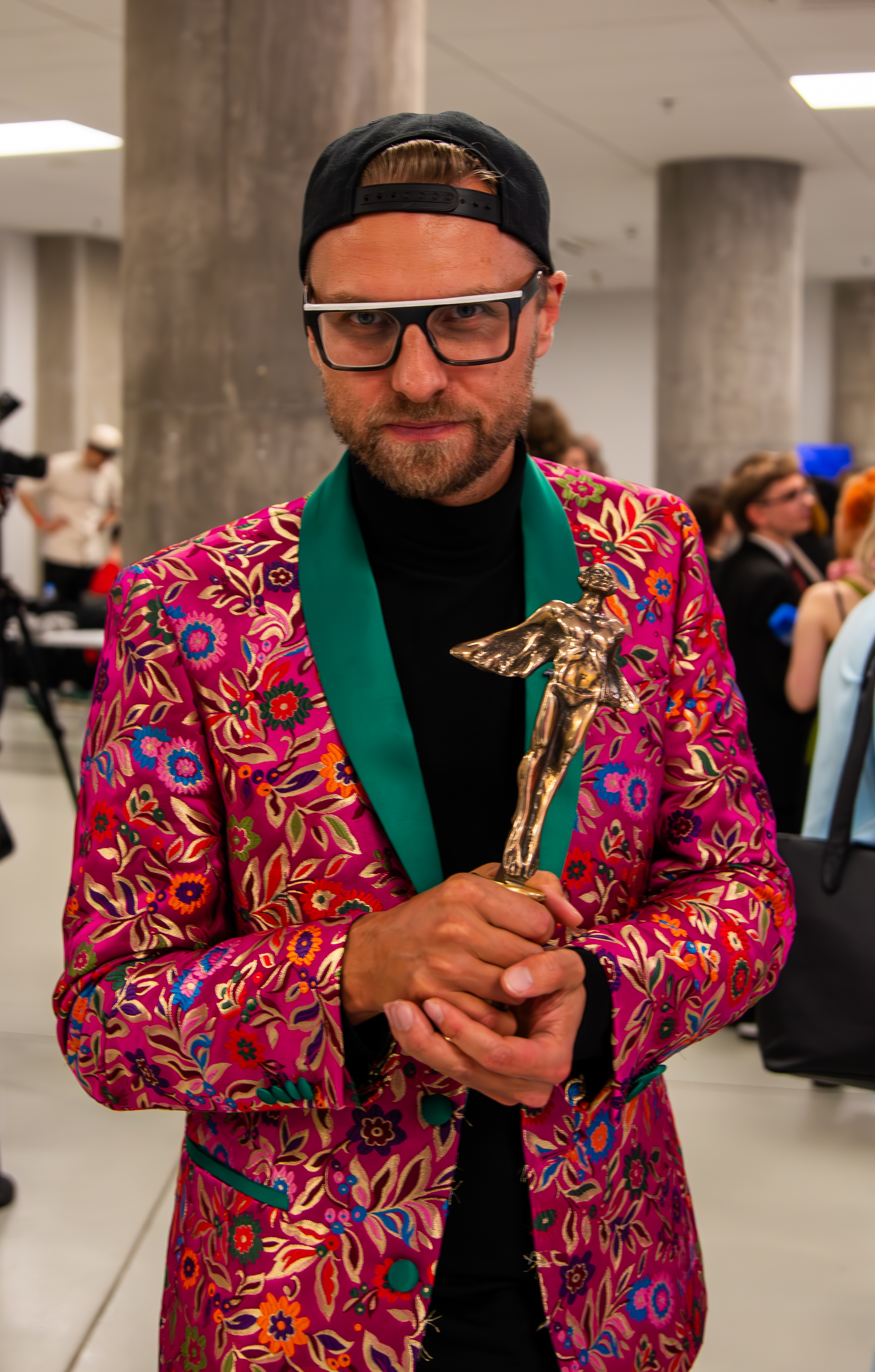
- L.U.C in 2024

Background information
- Also known as: L.U.C
- Born: Łukasz Rostkowski; 16 September 1981 (age 45); Zielona Góra
- Genres: Hip hop, trip hop, nu jazz
- Occupations: Rapper, entrepreneur, record producer
- Labels: Kayax, 2.47, A.A. MTJ, EMI Music Poland, Parlophone Music Poland, Warner Music Poland

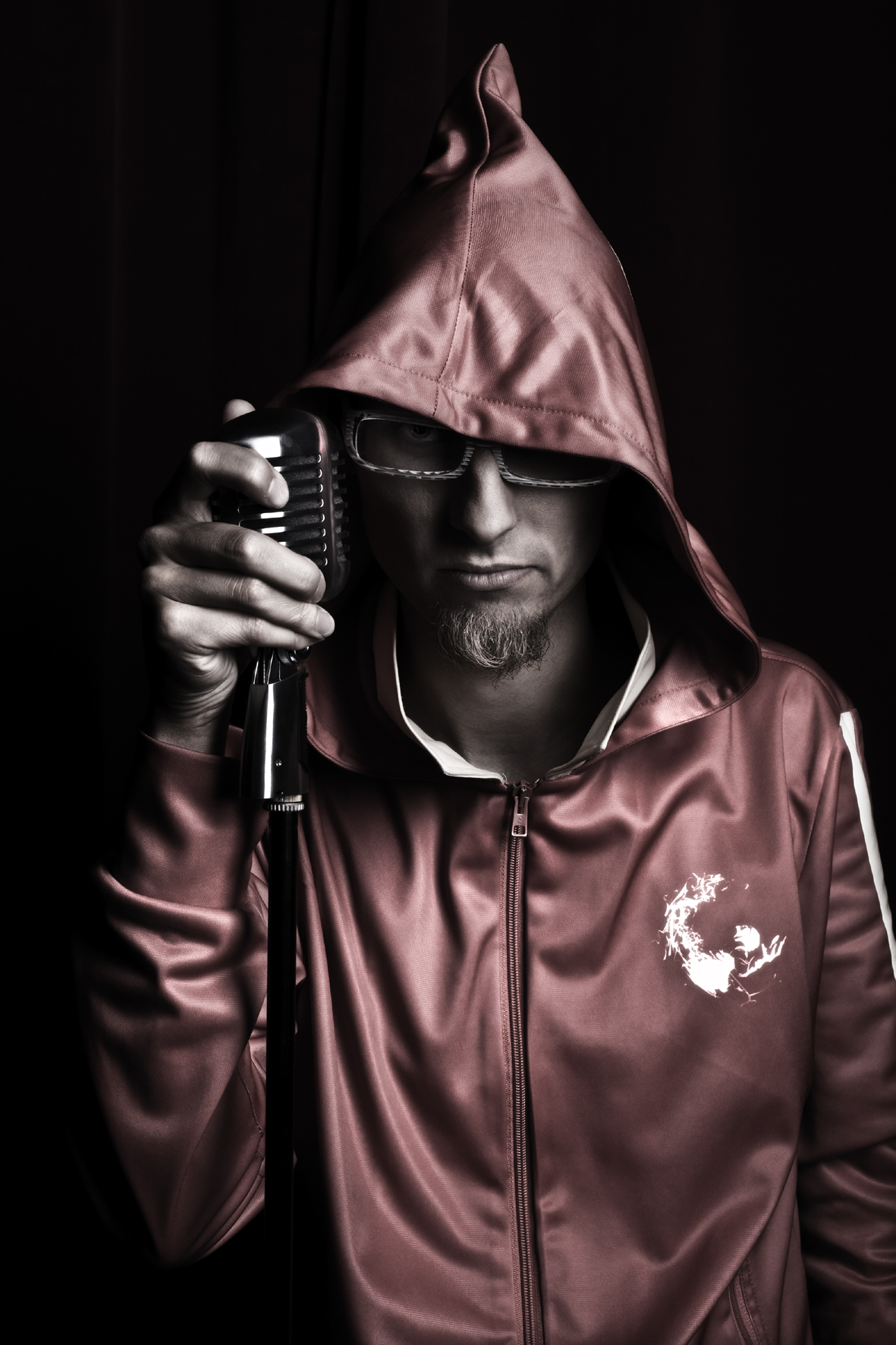
Rostowski, May 2005

L.U.C is the alias of Łukasz Rostkowski, a Polish rapper and entrepreneur who works in Wrocław. He is the founder, vocalist and co-producer of musical project Kanał Audytywny, and currently works through his solo albums.

== Discography ==
=== Albums ===
Title	Album details	Peak chart positions
Title	Album details	POL
Haelucenogenoklektyzm	Released: 19 June 2006; Label: Kayax Music; Formats: CD, digital download	—
Planet L.U.C	Released: 17 November 2008; Label: Antyforma; Formats: CD	—
39/89 - Zrozumieć Polskę	Released: 17 September 2009; Label: EMI Music Poland; Formats: CD	9
PyyKyCyKyTyPff	Released: 22 October 2010; Label: EMI Music Poland; Formats: CD, digital download	28
Warsaw WAR/SAW. Zrozumieć Polskę	Released: 16 May 2011; Label: EMI Music Poland; Formats: CD	—
Kosmostumostów	Released: 22 October 2011; Label: EMI Music Poland; Formats: CD	30
Sleepoholic	Released: 14 October 2013; Label: Parlophone Music Poland; Formats: CD	—
Przekrój	Released: 18 March 2014; Label: Warner Music Poland; Formats: CD, digital download	—
"—" denotes a recording that did not chart or was not released in that territory.

=== Collaborative albums ===
Title	Album details	Peak chart positions
Title	Album details	POL
Homoxymoronomatura (with Rahim)	Released: 19 October 2007; Label: Kayax/EMI Music Poland; Formats: CD, digital download	—
Nic się nie stało (with Motion Trio)	Released: 17 April 2013; Label: L.U.C/Motion Trio/EMI Music Poland; Formats: CD, digital download	25
City of Harmony (with Motion Trio)	Released: 25 May 2013; Label: L.U.C/Motion Trio/EMI Music Poland; Formats: CD	—
"—" denotes a recording that did not chart or was not released in that territory.

=== Music videos ===
Year	Title	Directed	Album	Ref.
2006	"Porwano Ludzi z Miasta Stumostów" (with Andrzej Smolik)	—	Haelucenogenoklektyzm	
2006	"Pomiędzy Wszystkim" (with Spaso)	Krzysztof Gawalkiewicz, L.U.C	Haelucenogenoklektyzm	
2006	"Nuda" (with Kejb)	Martynka Spryszynska, L.U.C	Haelucenogenoklektyzm	
2006	"Pukagastrofazy Godzina" (with Leszek Możdżer, Igor Pudło)	L.U.C, Moustash Film, Kayax, Wojtek Zieliński	Haelucenogenoklektyzm	
2006	"Stan Haelucynogenny" (with Ńemy)	—	Haelucenogenoklektyzm	
2006	"Wyprałem w Pralce Własny Mózg" (with Dawid Szczęsny)	—	Haelucenogenoklektyzm	
2007	L.U.C & Rahim – "Hemoglobina" (with Maria Peszek, pMx)	—	Homoxymoronomatura	
2007	L.U.C & Rahim – "Nibyminipocieszne Psychomaterionety"	L.U.C, Grupa 13	Homoxymoronomatura	
2008	"Remont" (with Ńemy, Kanał Audytywny)	—	Planet L.U.C	
2008	"Posiadam Wszystko"	—	Pukagastrofazy godzina (single)	
2008	"Co z tą Polską" (with Fokus, Rahim)	Piotr Bartos, L.U.C	Planet L.U.C	
2008	"Kiedy nie będzie lekko" (with Czak Noris)	L.U.C, Piotr Bartos	Planet L.U.C	
2008	"Półobrót Czaka" (with Ńemy)	—	Planet L.U.C	
2008	"O Witu" (with Ńemy, Zgas)	—	Planet L.U.C	
2008	"O karuzeli życia" (with Ńemy, Zgas)	Piotr Bartos, L.U.C	Planet L.U.C	
2008	"Happy End" (with Ńemy)	Piotr Bartos, L.U.C	Planet L.U.C	
2009	"O energocyrkulacji" (with Urszula Dudziak)	Michał Dziekan	Planet L.U.C	
2010	"Kto jest ostatni?" (with Abradab)	L.U.C	PyyKyCyKyTyPff	
2010	"Jak dziadek w kiosku całe życie w Ruchu"	L.U.C, Endorfina Artmedia	PyyKyCyKyTyPff	
2010	"7. Przebudzenie (Narodowa schizofrenia)"	L.U.C, Endorfina Artmedia	PyyKyCyKyTyPff	
2010	"Loopedoom!"	L.U.C	PyyKyCyKyTyPff	
2011	"Pospolite Ruszenie" (with Sokół)	L.U.C, Endorfina Artmedia	Kosmostumostów	
2011	"Kosmostumostów" (with Trzeci Wymiar)	L.U.C, Tomasz Dyrduła	Kosmostumostów	
