= Kaliber 44 =

Polish hip hop band

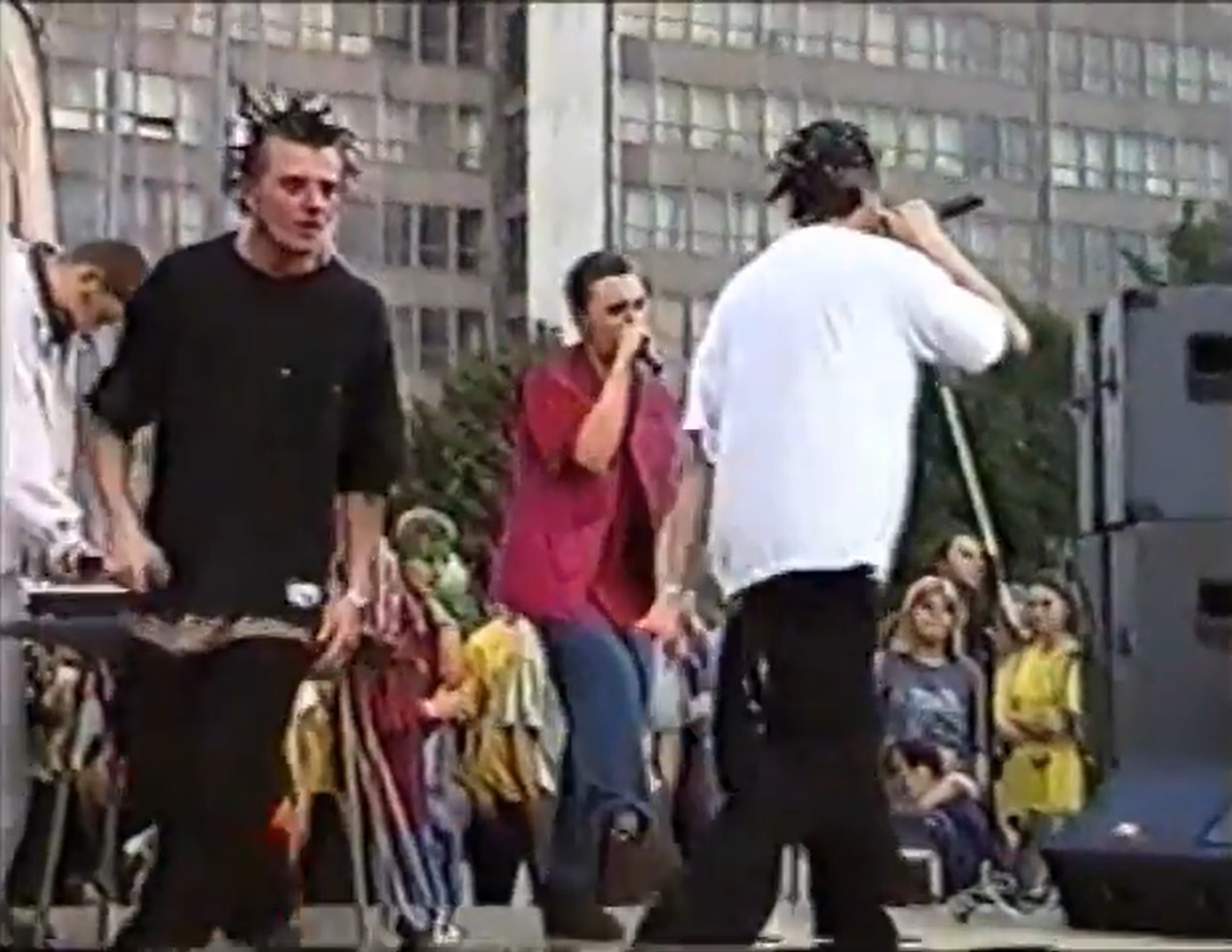
- Kaliber 44 c. 1996, from left: DJ Feel-X, Magik, Joka, Abradab

Background information
- Also known as: K44
- Origin: Katowice, Poland
- Genre: Hip hop
- Years active: 1993–2003, from 2013
- Label: S.P. Records
- Members: Abradab, DJ Eprom
- Past members: Joka, Magik, DJ Feel-X, Jajonasz, Gano

Kaliber 44 is a Polish hip hop group, formed in 1993 in Katowice. The group is dubbed the most influential Polish hip hop band, while their so-called hardcore psycho rap style is the most prominent. Its current members are Marcin "Abradab" Marten and Michał "Eprom" Baj. Over the years, the band was also co-founded by Michał "Joka" Marten, Piotr "Magik" Łuszcz, Sebastian "DJ Feel-X" Filiks, Rafał "Jajonasz" Łukaszczyk and Rafał "Gano" Wywioł.

With over a million albums sold, it is one of the most popular hip-hop bands in the history of the Polish music market. K44 was awarded the Fryderyk for the album 3:44, and was nominated for the award five times.

== Origin of the name ==
As revealed by Abradab in an interview aired on TVP, "the name comes from the time we weren't completely sane and played gangsta". Later on members provided a revised interpretation: first part of the name indicates the calibre of problems the group sings about. The number 44 is a reference to a prophetic poem Dziady written by Polish poet Adam Mickiewicz.

== Musical Career ==
"Księga Tajemnicza. Prolog", released on 10 November 1996, is widely regarded as the first Polish hardcore psychorap album and one of the earliest Polish releases to employ live-scratching techniques. At the time of recording and release, most members of the group were minors, which required parental consent to enter into a recording contract. The album achieved significant commercial success in Poland, selling several hundred thousand copies and receiving multiple nominations for major national music awards.

The group’s second studio album, "W 63 Minuty Dookoła Świata", released two years later, marked a departure from the darker aesthetic of the debut. The album incorporated stronger jazz influences, leading to comparisons with jazz-hop. Despite the stylistic shift, the release achieved a level of popularity comparable to that of the group’s debut.

On 2 September 2000, the group released their third album, "3:44", which featured a more traditional hip-hop sound, often compared to contemporary American productions. The album proved to be a critical and commercial breakthrough, earning the group the most prestigious accolades of their career up to that point.

The group’s fourth studio album, "Ułamek Tarcia", released on 2 March 2016, was met with widespread critical acclaim. The release reaffirmed the group’s established position within the Polish music scene and resulted in a return to the top of national music charts.

== Piotr Łuszcz ==
Soon after release of the second album "W 63 minuty dookoła świata" Magik retired from Kaliber 44, and formed new band called "Paktofonika" together with Sebastian "Rahim" Salbert and Wojciech "Fokus" Alszer.

On 26 December 2000, at around 6:15, "Magik" committed suicide by jumping out of the window of his apartment situated on the ninth floor of the building, in Katowice. At around 6:45, he was pronounced dead in a local hospital, leaving his wife Justyna, and a 3-year-old son, Filip.

== Discography ==
=== Studio albums ===
Title	Album details	Peak chart positions	Certifications
Title	Album details	POL	Certifications
Księga Tajemnicza. Prolog	Released: 10 November 1996; Label: S.P. Records	1	
W 63 minuty dookoła świata	Released: 2 March 1998; Label: S.P. Records	1	ZPAV: Platinum
3:44	Released: 2 September 2000; Label: S.P. Records	1	
Ułamek tarcia	Released: 13 February 2016; Label: Mystic Production	1	ZPAV: Platinum

=== Demo albums ===
Title	Album details
Usłysz nasze demo	Released: 1994; Label: Self-released
Demo 1995r.	Released: 1995; Label: Self-released

=== Singles ===
- "Magia i miecz" (The Magic and the Sword) (1996)
- "Film" (The Trip) (1998)
- "Konfrontacje/Rutyny" (Confrontations/Routines) (2000)
- "Nieodwracalne Zmiany" (Irreversible Changes) (2016)
- "(Why Is It) Fresh" (2016)
- "Czarny Śląsk" (Black Silesia) (2023)
- "TEN STYL, TEN RAP" (THAT STYLE, THAT RAP) (2024)
