= Abradab =

Polish rapper, actor and music producer (born 1978)

AbradAb
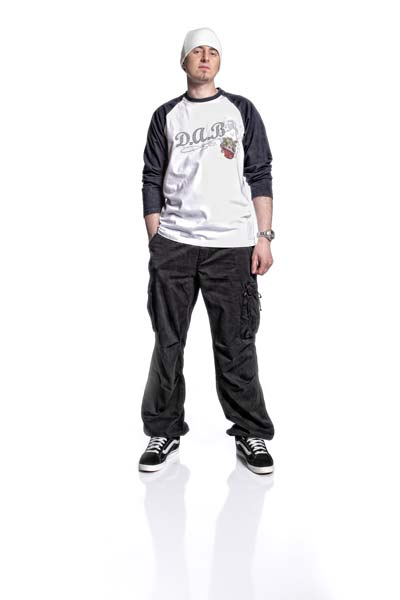

Background information
- Also known as: AbradAb, dAb, Lord MM dAb
- Born: Marcin Marten; 12 November 1978 (age 47); Katowice, Katowice Voivodeship, Polish People's Republic
- Genres: hip hop, rap
- Occupations: rapper, music producer, actor
- Years active: 1991–present
- Labels: S.P. Records, My Music, Inna-My-Twórnia
- Member of: Kaliber 44
- Website: abradab.pl

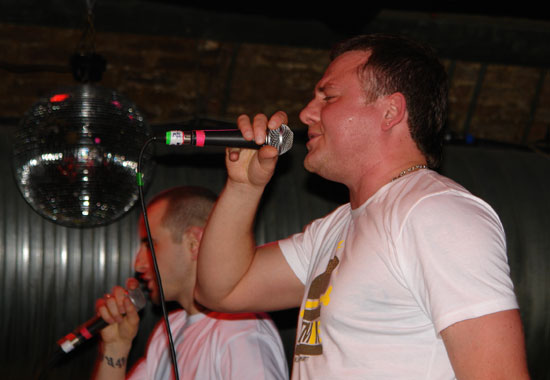
Michał and Marcin Marten during their concert in London in 2008

Marcin "AbradAb" Marten (born 12 November 1978 in Katowice) is a Polish rapper, actor and music producer. Marten is a founding member of big Polish hip-hop group Kaliber 44 and, since 2002, a solo artist. He is a member of Polish Society of the Phonographic Industry (Związek Producentów Audio Video, ZPAV). Marten is a winner of four Fryderyk awards. In 2011, Machina magazine placed Marten at No.17 on the list of 30 best Polish rappers. He has also collaborated with artists like Piotr Banach, Bosski Roman, Maciej Maleńczuk, Wojciech Waglewski, Grubson, L.U.C, Ania Dąbrowska, Happysad, Tede, Peja, Gromee, Augustus Pablo, Kali and O.S.T.R.

== History ==
=== Kaliber 44 ===
In 1993, Marcin Marten formed Kaliber 44 together with his brother Michał "Joka" Marten. The group was joined by Piotr Łuszcz performing under pseudonym Mag Magik I. In 1995, Kaliber 44 was signed to S. P. Records, and a year later their debut album Księga Tajemnicza. Prolog was released and became a huge success. In 1998, after the group recorded its second album W 63 minuty dookoła świata, Piotr "Magik" Łuszcz left the band. Kaliber 44's third album 3:44 was released in 2000 and got the Fryderyk award. Their last album "Ułamek Tarcia" was recorded in 2016 and they took first place of OLiS list.

=== Solo career (2002–present) ===
After the release of 3:44, Abradab started his solo career. On 6 June 2004, he released his first solo album Czerwony album through S. P. Records. The album charted at No.14 on OLiS. The album featured a popular song titled "Rapowe ziarno 2 (Szyderap)", for which a music video was released. The album won Fryderyk award in the "Album of the Year – Hip-Hop/R&B" category, while "Rapowe Ziarno 2 (Szyderap)" received a nomination in the "Video of the Year" category.

Abradab's second album Emisja spalin was released on 1 December 2005 and featured guest appearances by rapper Numer Raz, Gutek and Abradab's brother Joka. The album peak at No.38 on OLiS. Emisja spalin was followed by Ostatni poziom kontroli, which was released on 3 October 2008 and featured Grubson, reggae singer Marika and IGS. The album peaked at No.42 on OLiS. Both albums received nominations for Fryderyk award.

On 4 October 2010, the fourth solo record by Abradab was released. The album, titled Abradabing and produced by rapper O.S.T.R., received a Fryderyk award for Hip-hop/R&B Album of the Year. Marten's fifth studio album, ExtraVertik, was released on 21 April 2012 through Abradab's record label Inna-My-Twórnia.

== Discography ==
=== Solo albums ===
Title	Album details	Peak chart positions
Title	Album details	POL
Czerwony album	Released: 6 June 2004; Label: S.P. Records	14
Emisja spalin	Released: 1 December 2005; Label: S.P. Records	38
Ostatni poziom kontroli	Released: 3 October 2008; Label: My Music	42
Abradabing	Released: 4 October 2010; Label: Inna-My-Twórnia/Fonografika	8
ExtraVertik	Released: 21 April 2012; Label: Inna-My-Twórnia/Fonografika	30
048	Released: 26 November 2019; Label: Mystic production	38

=== Music videos ===
Year	Title	Director(s)	Album	! Source
"Miasto jest nasze" (feat. Piotr "Gutek" Gutkowski)	2004	—	Czerwony album	
"Rapowe ziarno 2 (Szyderap)" (feat. Piotr "Gutek" Gutkowski)	2004	Kobas Laksa	Czerwony album	
"Rap to nie zabawa już" (feat. Joka, DJ Feel-X)	2005	Kobas Laksa, Luk Gutt	Emisja spalin	
"Odór" (feat. Grubson)	2009	Przedmarańcza	Ostatni poziom kontroli	
"Szukam Cię pod swój rytm" (feat. Marika)	2009	Przedmarańcza	Ostatni poziom kontroli	
"Mamy królów na banknotach"	2010	Przedmarańcza	Abradabing	
"Spadam"	2010	Tomasz "Fromski" Bochniak, Maciej "Manas" Lenda	Abradabing	
"My nadal (chcemy być sobą)" (feat. Grzegorz Markowski)	2011	Jacek Kościuszko		
"Kiedywejde"	2012	Przedmarańcza	ExtraVertik	
"Pół na pół"	2012	—	ExtraVertik	

== Awards and nominations ==
=== Fryderyk ===
Year	Nominee / work	Award	Result
2004	Czerwony album	Album of the Year – Hip-Hop/R&B	Won
2004	"Rapowe Ziarno 2 (Szyderap)"	Video of the Year	Nominated
2006	Emisja spalin	Album of the Year – Hip-Hop/R&B	Nominated
2009	Ostatni poziom kontroli	Album of the Year – Hip-Hop/R&B	Nominated
2011	Abradabing	Album of the Year – Hip-Hop/R&B	Won
2011	Męskie granie (with Smolik, Maleńczuk, Waglewski, Mitch&Mitch, Pogodno, Fisz Emade, Kim Nowak, DJ Eprom, OXY.GEN, Voo Voo, Jacaszek)	Album of the Year – Alternative	Won
2019	048	Album of the Year – Hip-Hop/R&B	Nominated

=== Superjedynki ===
Year	Nominee / work	Award	Result
2005	Czerwony album	Album hip-hop	Nominated
2006	Emisja spalin	Album hip-hop	Nominated
