= Tede (rapper) =

Polish rapper

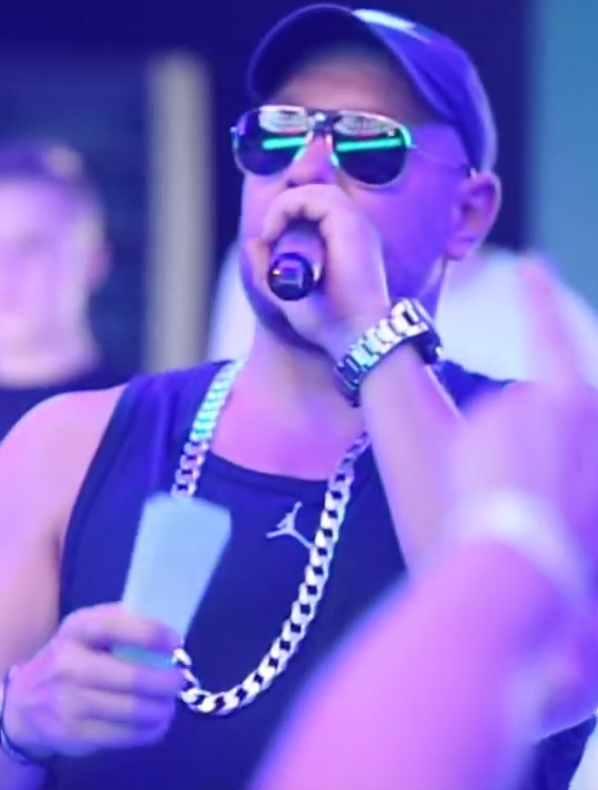
- Tede in Sanok

Background information
- Also known as: Jacek Graniecki
- Born: 24 July 1976 (age 50)
- Origin: Warsaw, Poland
- Genre: Hip hop
- Occupations: Rapper, actor, record producer
- Years active: 1996–present
- Label: Wielkie Joł
- Website: http://www.wielkiejol.com/

Jacek Graniecki (Polish pronunciation: [ˈjat͡sɛk ɡraˈɲɛt͡skʲi]), known professionally as Tede (Polish pronunciation: [ˈtɛdɛ]) and DJ Buhh (Polish pronunciation: [ˈdid͡ʐɛj ˈbux]), is a Polish rapper. He is also known as Tas De Fleia, TDF, Tedzik, Tedunio, and Chory Pastor. Graniecki began his career in the group 1 kHz (Ein Killa Hertz). In 1996, JanMario and Tede formed the group Trzyha ("Triple H", which stands for "hardcore hip-hop"), with the group changing their name to Warszafski Deszcz ("Warsaw's Rain") in 1998. In 2000, Tede began his solo career and in 2001 he recorded his first album, S.P.O.R.T. In 2002, he founded his own record label, Wielkie Joł. He was ranked third in music magazine Machina's list of the thirty best Polish rappers in 2011. In January 2024, Tede, after years of journalistic experience with TVN and 4funTV, officially joined Kanał Zero.

== Discography ==
Studio albums

- 2001: S.P.O.R.T. POL #28
- 2003: Hajs, Hajs, Hajs (Cash, Cash, Cash) POL #8
- 2004: Notes (Note-book) POL #7
- 2006: Esende Mylffon POL #15
- 2008: Ścieżka dźwiękowa (Soundtrack) POL #8
- 2009: Note2 (Note-book 2) POL #3 (certified gold)
- 2010: FuckTede/Glam Rap POL #2 (certified gold)
- 2010: Notes 3D (Note-book 3D) POL #23
- 2012: Mefistotedes/Odkupienie (Mefistotedes/Redemption) POL #3 (certified gold)
- 2013: Elliminati POL #2 (certified gold)
- 2014: #kurt_rolson POL #3 (certified gold)
- 2015: Vanillahajs (VanillaCash) POL #1 (certified 2× platinum)
- 2016: Keptn' (Captain) POL #1 (certified gold)
- 2017: SKRRRT POL #1 (certified gold)
- 2018: NOJI? (SOWHAT?) POL #2
- 2019: Karmagedon POL #1
- 2020: Disco Noir POL #1

Live albums

- 2017: Pół życia na żywo (Half of the Life Live)

Trzyha

- 1997: WuWuA (slang for Warsaw)

Warszafski Deszcz

- 1999: Nastukafszy... (Getting High)
- 2007: Reminiscencje (Reminiscences)
- 2009: Powrócifszy... (Making a Return)
- 2011: PraWFDepowiedziafszy (Telling The Truth with shortened name of the band added to it (WFD states for Warszafski Deszcz))

Collaborative albums

- 2013: Przypadek? #niesondze (Coincidence? #idontthinkso with Potwierdzone Info)

Extended plays

- 2009: Note2 Errata (Note-book 2 Erratum)
- 2012: Spacer (Walk, with Szyna)
- 2013: Elliminaticket
- 2014: #kurort_rolson
- 2017: Letnie czartery (Summer Charters)
- 2020: Disco Noir: Przedłużyfszy (Disco Noir: Extended)

Mixtapes

- 2003: DJ Buhh - Wolumin I: Hałas (Volume I: Noise)
- 2003: DJ Buhh - Wolumin II: George W. Buhh (Volume II: George W. Buhh)
- 2004: DJ Buhh - Wolumin III: Buhhmacher (Volume III: Buhhmaker)
- 2006: DJ Buhh - Esende Mylffon Hałas (Esende Mylffon Noise)
- 2006: Tede & DJ Macu - Wypijmy za blendy Vol. 1 (Let's Drink for Blends Vol. 1)
- 2006: Tede & DJ Buhh - Trzy korony (Three Crowns)
- 2007: Tede & DJ Macu - Wypijmy za blendy Vol. 2: Wypijmy za błędy (Let's Drink for Blends Vol. 2: Let's Drink for Mistakes)
- 2007: DJ Buhh Presents Tede, Jay-Z, Matheo - American Mylffon
- 2008: DJ Buhh - Wolumin IV: Pierdolę was (Volume IV: Fuck You)
- 2009: Tede & DJ Tuniziano - A/H24N2
- 2010: DJ Buhh - Wolumin V: Facebuhh
- 2011: DJ Buhh - South Tropez (with Dabl Blast)
- 2012: Tede, DJ Tuniziano & DJ Buhh - Droga do odkupienia (Way to Redemption)
- 2012: Tede & DJ Tuniziano - Numer stulecia
- 2013: Paff Bangerski & Tede - PAFFISTOTEDES
- 2014: młodyGrzech & Tede - Ultradźwięki (Ultrasound)
- 2015: DJ Buhh - Wolumin VII - Hans Ximer: Uwertura (Volume VII - Hans Ximer: Overture)
