= DJ Feel-X =

DJ Feel-X Sebastian Filiks
- Born: February 7, 1978 (age 47); Lublin, Poland
- Origin: Końskie, Poland
- Genres: Hip-hop; dancehall; reggae
- Occupations: DJ; music producer
- Years active: 1995-present

Sebastian Filiks, better known under his stage name DJ Feel-X (born February 7, 1978, in Lublin) is a Polish DJ and hip-hop producer.

== Career ==
In the 1990s, he was one of the pioneer on Polish hip-hop scene when he debuted with Kaliber 44's album Księga Tajemnicza. Prolog in 1996. During his career he has worked with most of the famous Polish rappers and groups such as DJ 600 V, AbradAb, Kali, Firma, Bas Tajpan, Gutek, Frenchman, Kazik Staszewski, Kult and more. He is also a founder of a label Siła-Z-Pokoju Version Records.

He was member of Kaliber 44 and Wzgórze Ya-Pa-3. In 2016 during a radio show, Abradab announced that DJ Feel-X had left the group due to the lack of understanding.
