= Sanah discography =

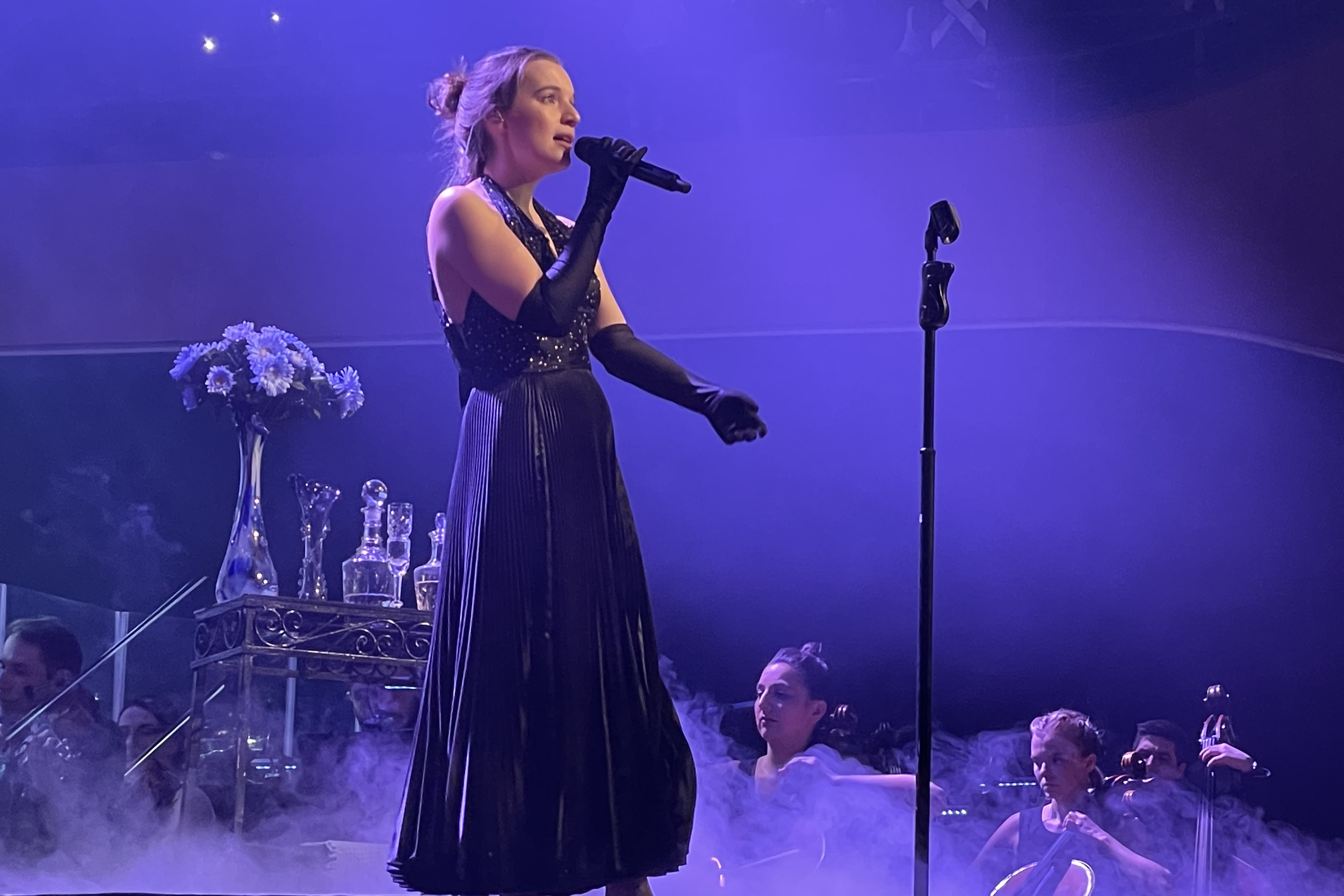
- Sanah performing in 2023
- Studio albums: 6
- EPs: 5
- Live albums: 5
- Singles: 69
- Other albums: 1

The discography of Polish singer and songwriter Sanah consists of six studio albums, five live album, one other album, five extended plays, and 69 singles. She has topped the Polish music charts on 14 occasions, with four studio albums and ten singles, and collected 33 diamond, 67 platinum, and 24 gold certifications from the Polish Society of the Phonographic Industry, selling over 11.22 million records in Poland alone.

== Studio albums ==
List of studio albums, with selected chart positions and certifications
| Title | Album details | Peak chart positions | Certifications |
| Title | Album details | POL | Certifications |
|---|---|---|---|
| Królowa dram | Released: 8 May 2020; Label: Magic Records; Formats: CD, LP, digital download, streaming | 1 | ZPAV: Diamond |
| Irenka | Released: 7 May 2021; Label: Magic Records; Formats: CD, LP, digital download, streaming | 1 | ZPAV: 2× Diamond |
| Uczta | Released: 15 April 2022; Label: Magic Records; Formats: CD, LP, digital download, streaming | 1 | ZPAV: 2× Diamond |
| Sanah śpiewa poezyje | Released: 25 November 2022; Label: Magic Records; Formats: CD, LP, digital download, streaming | 1 | ZPAV: Diamond |
| Kaprysy | Released: 14 June 2024; Label: Magic Records; Formats: CD, LP, digital download, streaming | 1 | ZPAV: Diamond |
| Dwoje ludzieńków | Released: 16 May 2025; Label: Magic Records; Formats: CD, LP, digital download, streaming | 1 | ZPAV: 2× Platinum |

== Live albums ==
List of live albums, with selected chart positions
| Title | Details | Peak chart positions | Certifications |
| Title | Details | POL | Certifications |
|---|---|---|---|
| Bankiet u Sanah | Released: 1 December 2023; Label: Magic Records; Formats: 2×CD, LP, digital download, streaming | 2 | ZPAV: Platinum |
| Sanah na stadionach Live | Released: 22 May 2026; Label: Magic Records; Format: LP | 3 | |
| Enklawa S02E02: Sanah (Enklawa Live) | Released: 1 October 2026; Label: Magic Records; Formats: Digital download, streaming | — | |
| Sanah na stadionach Live, część 2 | Released: 30 October 2026; Label: Magic Records; Format: LP | 3 | |
| Sanah na stadionach Live, część 3 | Released: 4 December 2026; Label: Magic Records; Format: LP | To be released | |
"—" denotes a recording that did not chart or was not released in that territory.

== Other albums ==
List of other albums, with selected chart positions and certifications
| Title | Details | Peak chart positions | Certifications |
| Title | Details | POL | Certifications |
|---|---|---|---|
| Pianinkowe kaprysy | Released: 30 August 2024; Label: Magic Records; Formats: CD, LP, digital download, streaming | 1 | ZPAV: Gold |

== Extended plays ==
List of extended plays, with selected chart positions
| Title | Details | Peak chart positions | Certifications |
| Title | Details | POL | Certifications |
|---|---|---|---|
| Ja na imię niewidzialna mam | Released: 11 October 2019; Label: Magic Records; Formats: LP, digital download, streaming | — | ZPAV: 2× Platinum |
| Bujda | Released: 23 October 2020; Label: Magic Records; Formats: LP, digital download, streaming, cassette | 27 | ZPAV: 2× Platinum |
| Invisible EP | Released: 12 June 2021; Label: Magic Records; Format: LP | — | |
| Can You Love Me for Who I Am? | Released: 24 October 2024; Label: Magic Records; Formats: Digital download, streaming | — | |
| Can You Love Me for Who I Am? Part 2 | Released: 14 November 2024; Label: Magic Records; Formats: Digital download, streaming | — | |
"—" denotes a recording that did not chart or was not released in that territory.

== Singles ==
=== As lead artist ===
List of singles as lead artist, with selected chart positions and certifications, showing year released and album name
| Title | Year | Peak chart positions | | | | Certifications | Album |
| Title | Year | POL Air. | POL Stream. | POL Billb. | CIS | Certifications | Album |
|---|---|---|---|---|---|---|---|
| "Rehab" (as Ayreen) | 2017 | — | * | | — | | Non-album single |
| "Cząstka" | 2019 | — | * | | — | ZPAV: 4× Platinum | Ja na imię niewidzialna mam |
| "Siebie zapytasz" | 2019 | — | * | | — | ZPAV: Diamond | Ja na imię niewidzialna mam |
| "Proszę pana" | 2019 | — | * | | — | ZPAV: Platinum | Ja na imię niewidzialna mam |
| "Szampan" | 2020 | 1 | * | | — | ZPAV: Diamond | Królowa dram |
| "Melodia" | 2020 | 1 | * | | 978 | ZPAV: Diamond | Królowa dram |
| "Królowa dram" | 2020 | — | * | | — | ZPAV: 3× Platinum | Królowa dram |
| "No sory" | 2020 | 1 | * | | 970 | ZPAV: Diamond | Bujda |
| "Pożal się Boże" | 2020 | — | * | | — | ZPAV: Gold | Bujda |
| "Bujda" | 2020 | — | * | | — | ZPAV: 2× Platinum | Bujda |
| "Ale jazz!" (with Vito Bambino) | 2021 | 1 | 81 | * | — | ZPAV: 2× Diamond | Irenka |
| "2:00" | 2021 | — | * | | — | ZPAV: Diamond | Irenka |
| "Etc. (na disco)" | 2021 | 3 | * | | — | ZPAV: Diamond | Irenka |
| "Ten stan" | 2021 | 1 | * | | — | ZPAV: 2× Diamond | Irenka |
| "Cześć, jak się masz?" (Note: "Cześć, jak się masz?" only appears on the Final Edition of Irenka and on the Deluxe Edition Pułapka na motyle.) (with Sobel) | 2021 | 1 | 88 | 24 | — | ZPAV: Diamond | Irenka |
| "Kolońska i szlugi" (Note: "Kolońska i szlugi" only appears on the Final Edition of Irenka.) | 2021 | 3 | * | | — | ZPAV: Diamond | Irenka |
| "Mamo tyś płakała" (with Igor Herbut) | 2022 | — | * | 2 | — | ZPAV: 3× Platinum | Uczta |
| "Szary świat" (with Kwiat Jabłoni) | 2022 | 1 | 85 | 1 | — | ZPAV: 2× Diamond | Uczta |
| "Czesława" (with Natalia Grosiak) | 2022 | — | * | 16 | — | ZPAV: Platinum | Uczta |
| "Tęsknię sobie" (with Artur Rojek) | 2022 | — | * | 3 | — | ZPAV: Diamond | Uczta |
| "Audi" (with Miętha) | 2022 | — | * | — | — | ZPAV: Gold | Uczta |
| "Sen we śnie" (Note: A poem by Edgar Allan Poe.) (with Grzegorz Turnau) | 2022 | — | * | 3 | — | ZPAV: 4× Platinum | Uczta |
| "Baczyński (Pisz do mnie listy)" (Note: A poem by Krzysztof Kamil Baczyński.) (with Ania Dąbrowska) | 2022 | — | * | — | — | ZPAV: Gold | Uczta |
| "Eldorado" (with Daria Zawiałow) | 2022 | 1 | 47 | 5 | — | ZPAV: Diamond | Uczta |
| "Oscar" (with Vito Bambino) | 2022 | — | * | 20 | — | ZPAV: Gold | Uczta |
| "Ostatnia nadzieja" (with Dawid Podsiadło) | 2022 | 1 | 19 | 3 | — | ZPAV: 2× Diamond | Uczta |
| "Święty Graal" (with ten Stan) | 2022 | — | * | — | — | | Uczta |
| "Rozwijając Rilkego" (Note: A poem by Jacek Cygan.) | 2022 | — | * | — | — | ZPAV: Gold | Sanah śpiewa poezyje |
| "Hymn" (Note: A poem by Juliusz Słowacki.) | 2022 | — | 57 | 2 | — | ZPAV: 4× Platinum | Sanah śpiewa poezyje |
| "Do * w sztambuch" (Note: A poem by Adam Mickiewicz.) | 2022 | — | * | 18 | — | ZPAV: 2× Platinum | Sanah śpiewa poezyje |
| "Nic dwa razy" (Note: A poem by Wisława Szymborska.) | 2022 | 1 | 2 | 1 | 487 | ZPAV: 2× Diamond | Sanah śpiewa poezyje |
| "(I) Da Bóg kiedyś zasiąść w Polsce wolnej" (Note: A poem by Adam Asnyk.) | 2022 | — | * | 10 | — | | Sanah śpiewa poezyje |
| "Warszawa" (Note: A poem by Julian Tuwim.) | 2022 | — | * | — | — | ZPAV: Gold | Sanah śpiewa poezyje |
| "Bajka" | 2022 | — | * | 20 | — | ZPAV: Platinum | Sanah śpiewa poezyje |
| "Eldorado" | 2022 | — | * | — | — | | Sanah śpiewa poezyje |
| "Kamień" | 2022 | — | * | — | — | ZPAV: Gold | Sanah śpiewa poezyje |
| "(II) Da Bóg kiedyś zasiąść w Polsce wolnej" | 2022 | — | * | — | — | | Sanah śpiewa poezyje |
| "Najlepszy dzień w moim życiu" | 2022 | 2 | 13 | 4 | — | ZPAV: Diamond | Non-album single |
| "Wilcza zamieć" | 2022 | — | * | — | — | | The Witcher 3: Wild Hunt |
| "Płomień" | 2023 | — | 24 | 25 | — | | Non-album single |
| "Mustang" (with Vito Bambino) | 2023 | — | 28 | 22 | — | ZPAV: Platinum | Pracownia |
| "Marcepan" | 2023 | 6 | 1 | 1 | — | ZPAV: Diamond | Non-album single |
| "Pocałunki" (Note: A poem by Maria Pawlikowska-Jasnorzewska.) (Note: "Pocałunki" and "Na grobie rycerz" only appears on the Deluxe Edition of Dwoje ludzieńków.) | 2023 | 5 | 4 | 5 | — | ZPAV: 4× Platinum | Dwoje ludzieńków |
| "Skanah" | 2023 | — | 26 | 25 | — | ZPAV: Gold | Non-album single |
| "Jestem twoją bajką" | 2023 | 8 | 3 | 4 | — | ZPAV: Diamond | Kleks Academy |
| "Na grobie rycerz" (Note: A poem by Maria Konopnicka.) | 2023 | — | 60 | — | — | | Powstaniec 1863; Dwoje ludzieńków |
| "Hip hip hura!" | 2024 | 1 | 10 | 9 | — | ZPAV: 4× Platinum | Kaprysy |
| "Cała sala śpiewa!" (as Siostry Grabowskie) | 2024 | — | 78 | — | — | ZPAV: Gold | Non-album single |
| "Śrubka" | 2024 | — | 21 | 21 | — | ZPAV: Platinum | Kaprysy |
| "Było, minęło" | 2024 | 1 | 3 | 3 | — | ZPAV: Diamond | Kaprysy |
| "Falling Back" (with Matteo Bocelli) | 2024 | — | 96 | — | — | | Matteo |
| "Miłość jest ślepa" | 2024 | 1 | 5 | 5 | — | ZPAV: Diamond | Kaprysy |
| "Wynalazek Filipa Golarza" (with Sobel) | 2024 | 4 | 2 | 2 | — | ZPAV: 2× Platinum | Kleks i wynalazek Filipa Golarza |
| "Eviva l'arte!" (Note: A poem by Kazimierz Przerwa-Tetmajer.) (with Krzysztof Zalewski) | 2025 | 2 | 13 | 15 | — | ZPAV: Platinum | Dwoje ludzieńków |
| "Elegia o... (chłopcu polskim)" (with Michał Bajor) | 2025 | — | 23 | 25 | — | | Dwoje ludzieńków |
| "Kochałam pana" (Note: A poem by Agnieszka Osiecka.) (with Anna Maria Jopek) | 2025 | — | 55 | — | — | | Dwoje ludzieńków |
| "Maj 1939" (Note: A poem by Zuzanna Ginczanka.) (with Mela Koteluk) | 2025 | — | — | — | — | | Dwoje ludzieńków |
| "Piosenka" (Note: A poem by Czesław Miłosz.) (with Kuba Badach) | 2025 | — | 75 | — | — | | Dwoje ludzieńków |
| "Jesienią" (with Mazowsze) | 2025 | — | 81 | — | — | | Dwoje ludzieńków |
| "Był bal" (Note: A poem by Jonasz Kofta.) (with Natalia Szroeder) | 2025 | — | 47 | — | — | | Dwoje ludzieńków |
| "Inwokacja" (with Grzegorz Skawiński) | 2025 | — | 77 | — | — | | Dwoje ludzieńków |
| "Ofelia" (with Nosowska) | 2025 | — | 78 | — | — | | Dwoje ludzieńków |
| "Oczyszczenie" (Note: A poem by Tadeusz Różewicz.) (with Alicja Majewska) | 2025 | — | — | — | — | | Dwoje ludzieńków |
| "Kiedy umrę kochanie" (Note: A poem by Halina Poświatowska.) (with Kasia Kowalska) | 2025 | 8 | 24 | — | — | ZPAV: Platinum | Dwoje ludzieńków |
| "Dwoje ludzieńków" (Note: A poem by Bolesław Leśmian.) (with Sobel) | 2025 | — | 3 | 4 | — | ZPAV: Platinum | Dwoje ludzieńków |
| "Boogie Woogie" (as Siostry Grabowskie) | 2025 | — | — | — | — | | Non-album singles |
| "Itepe itede" | 2026 | 8 | 49 | 25 | — | | Non-album singles |
| "Kapitan" | 2026 | — | 53 | — | — | | Non-album singles |
| "Cicho sza" | 2026 | 16 | 20 | 25 | — | | Non-album singles |
"—" denotes items which were not released in that country or failed to chart. "*" denotes the chart did not exist at that time.

=== As featured artist ===
List of singles as a featured artist, showing year released and album name
| Title | Year | Album |
|---|---|---|
| "Rich in Love" (Matt Dusk featuring Sanah) | 2019 | Jet Set Jazz (Polish release) |
| "Przyjdzie Panie zaginąć" (Polskie Znaki featuring Sanah) | 2021 | Rzeczy ostatnie |

=== Promotional singles ===
List of promotional singles, with selected chart positions and certifications, showing year released and album name
| Title | Year | Peak chart positions | Certifications | Album |
| Title | Year | POL Air. | Certifications | Album |
|---|---|---|---|---|
| "Bez słów" | 2019 | — | ZPAV: Gold | Ja na imię niewidzialna mam |
| "Solo" | 2019 | — | ZPAV: Gold | Ja na imię niewidzialna mam |
| "Idź" | 2019 | — | ZPAV: Platinum | Ja na imię niewidzialna mam |
| "Aniołom szepnij to" | 2019 | — | ZPAV: Platinum | Ja na imię niewidzialna mam |
| "Projekt nieznajomy nie kłamie" | 2019 | — | ZPAV: Platinum | Bujda |
| "Róże (demo w domu)" | 2020 | — | ZPAV: Gold | Bujda |
| "No sory" (alternative version) | 2020 | — | | Bujda |
| "Invisible Dress" (Maro Music x Skytech Remix) | 2020 | 6 | ZPAV: 2× Platinum | Invisible EP |
| "Heal Me" | 2021 | — | | Non-album single |
| "Etc." | 2021 | — | ZPAV: Platinum | Irenka |
| "Wszystko mi mówi, że mnie ktoś pokochał" | 2021 | — | ZPAV: Platinum | Non-album single |
| "Kolońska i szlugi (do snu)" | 2021 | — | ZPAV: Platinum | Irenka |
| "Gdy śliczna Panna" | 2025 | — | | Non-album single |
"—" denotes items which were not released in that country or failed to chart.

== Other charted and certified songs ==
List of other charted songs, with certifications, showing year released and album name
| Title | Year | Peak chart positions | | | Certifications | Album |
| Title | Year | POL Stream. | POL Billb. | UKR | Certifications | Album |
|---|---|---|---|---|---|---|
| "Koronki" | 2019 | * | | — | ZPAV: Platinum | Ja na imię niewidzialna mam |
| "To ja a nie inna" | 2020 | * | | — | ZPAV: Gold | Królowa dram |
| "Łezki me" | 2020 | * | | — | ZPAV: Gold | Królowa dram |
| "Oto cała ja" | 2020 | * | | — | ZPAV: Platinum | Królowa dram |
| "2/10" | 2020 | * | | — | ZPAV: Gold | Królowa dram |
| "Sama" | 2020 | * | | — | ZPAV: Gold | Królowa dram |
| "Oczy" | 2020 | * | | — | ZPAV: Diamond | Bujda |
| "Duszki" | 2020 | * | | — | ZPAV: Platinum | Bujda |
| "Invisible Dress (live for Vevo DSCVR)" (Note: "Invisible Dress (live for Vevo DSCVR)" only appears on the Final Edition of Królowa dram.) | 2020 | * | | 597 | | Królowa dram |
| "Pora roku zła" (Note: "Pora roku zła" only appears on the Final Edition of Królowa dram.) | 2020 | * | | — | ZPAV: Platinum | Królowa dram |
| "Co ja robię tutaj" | 2021 | * | | — | ZPAV: Platinum | Irenka |
| "To koniec" | 2021 | * | | — | ZPAV: 4× Platinum | Irenka |
| "Warcaby" | 2021 | * | | — | ZPAV: Gold | Irenka |
| "Irenka" | 2021 | * | | — | ZPAV: Platinum | Irenka |
| "Bujda (większa!)" | 2021 | * | | — | ZPAV: Gold | Irenka |
| "Wars" | 2021 | * | | — | ZPAV: Gold | Irenka |
| "Kapela gra" | 2021 | * | | — | ZPAV: Gold | Irenka |
| "O czym śnisz?" (Dawid Podsiadło featuring Sanah) | 2022 | * | 6 | — | ZPAV: Platinum | Lata dwudzieste |
| "Sad" | 2024 | 52 | — | — | | Kaprysy |
| "Talenty i mankamenty" | 2024 | 46 | — | — | ZPAV: Gold | Kaprysy |
| "Nimbostratus" | 2024 | 49 | — | — | | Kaprysy |
| "Wiśta wio!" | 2024 | 39 | — | — | ZPAV: Platinum | Kaprysy |
| "Mleczna droga" | 2024 | 65 | — | — | | Kaprysy |
| "Fafarafa" | 2024 | 69 | — | — | | Kaprysy |
| "Pańskie łzy to woda" | 2024 | 80 | — | — | | Kaprysy |
| "O miłości" | 2024 | 78 | — | — | | Kaprysy |
| "Do kiedy jestem" | 2024 | 90 | — | — | | Kaprysy |
| "Słodkiego miłego życzę" | 2024 | 67 | — | — | | Kaprysy |
| "Miłość jest ślepa (pianinkowe)" | 2024 | — | — | — | ZPAV: Gold | Pianinkowe kaprysy |
"—" denotes items which were not released in that country or failed to chart.

== Guest appearances ==
List of non-single guest appearances, with other performing artists, showing year released and album name
| Title | Year | Other artist(s) | Album |
|---|---|---|---|
| "Rich in Love" | 2019 | Matt Dusk | Jet Set Jazz (Polish release) |
| "Przyjdzie Panie zaginąć" | 2021 | Polskie Znaki | Rzeczy ostatnie |
| "Warszawa, ja i ty" | 2022 | Kwiat Jabłoni | Wolne serca |
| "O czym śnisz?" | 2022 | Dawid Podsiadło | Lata dwudzieste |
| "Mustang" | 2023 | Vito Bambino | Pracownia |
