= List of number-one singles of 2022 (Poland) =

This is a list of the songs that reached number-one position in official Polish single chart in ZPAV in 2022.

== Chart history ==
Issue date	Song	Artist(s)	Reference(s)
January 1	"Cześć, jak się masz?"	Sobel and Sanah	
January 8	"My Heart Goes (La Di Da)"	Becky Hill and Topic	
January 15	"Up"	Inna	
January 22	"Friendships (Lost My Love)"	Pascal Letoublon featuring Leony	
January 29	"The Motto"	Tiësto and Ava Max	
February 5	"Up"	Inna	
February 12	"Enemy"	Imagine Dragons and JID	
February 19	"Somebody"	Sara James	
February 26	"Somebody"	Sara James	
March 5	"Enemy"	Imagine Dragons and JID	
March 12	"Enemy"	Imagine Dragons and JID	
March 19	"Odbicie (Mark Neve Remix)"	Bryska	
March 26	"Odbicie (Mark Neve Remix)"	Bryska	
April 2	"Odbicie (Mark Neve Remix)"	Bryska	
April 9	"Odbicie (Mark Neve Remix)"	Bryska	
April 16	"Melody"	Sigala	
April 23	"Szary świat"	Sanah and Kwiat Jabłoni	
April 30	"Szary świat"	Sanah and Kwiat Jabłoni	
May 7	"Where Did You Go?"	Jax Jones featuring MNEK	
May 14	"Szary świat"	Sanah and Kwiat Jabłoni	
May 21	"Szary świat"	Sanah and Kwiat Jabłoni	
May 28	"Never Ending Story"	Daria and Kush Kush	
June 4	"As It Was"	Harry Styles	
June 11	"Ostatnia nadzieja"	Sanah and Dawid Podsiadło	
June 18	"As It Was"	Harry Styles	
June 25	"Ostatnia nadzieja"	Sanah and Dawid Podsiadło	
July 2	"MMM"	Minelli	
July 9	"MMM"	Minelli	
July 16	"Samba"	YouNotUs featuring Bryska	
July 23	"I Believe"	Kamrad	
July 30	"I Believe"	Kamrad	
August 6	"Fool Me Once"	Olivia Addams	
August 13	"Samba"	YouNotUs featuring Bryska	
August 20	"Samba"	YouNotUs featuring Bryska	
August 27	"Eldorado"	Sanah and Daria Zawiałow	
September 3	"Eldorado"	Sanah and Daria Zawiałow	
September 10	"Eldorado"	Sanah and Daria Zawiałow	
September 17	"Eldorado"	Sanah and Daria Zawiałow	
September 24	"Eldorado"	Sanah and Daria Zawiałow	
October 1	"Adrenalina"	Michał Szczygieł	
October 8	"Bad Memories"	Meduza and James Carter featuring Elley Duhé and Fast Boy	
October 15	"I'm Good (Blue)"	David Guetta and Bebe Rexha	
October 22	"Heavy Metal Love"	Twocolors	
October 29	"Heavy Metal Love"	Twocolors	
November 5	"Czekam na znak"	Ignacy	
November 12	"Czekam na znak"	Ignacy	
November 19	"To co masz Ty!"	Dawid Podsiadło	
November 26	"Czekam na znak"	Ignacy	
December 3	"To co masz Ty!"	Dawid Podsiadło	
December 10	"Nic dwa razy"	Sanah	
December 17	"To co masz Ty!"	Dawid Podsiadło	
December 24	"To co masz Ty!"	Dawid Podsiadło	

== Number-one artists ==
Position	Artist	Weeks at #1
1	Sanah	13
2	Bryska (as solo and featuring)	7
3	Dawid Podsiadło	6
4	Daria Zawiałow	5
5	Kwiat Jabłoni	4
6	Imagine Dragons	3
6	JID	3
6	YouNotUs	3
6	Ignacy	3
7	Inna	2
7	Sara James	2
7	Harry Styles	2
7	Minelli	2
7	Kamrad	2
7	Twocolors	2
8	Sobel	1
8	Becky Hill	1
8	Topic	1
8	Pascal Letoublon	1
8	Leony (as featuring)	1
8	Tiësto	1
8	Ava Max	1
8	Sigala	1
8	Jax Jones	1
8	MNEK (as featuring)	1
8	Daria	1
8	Kush Kush	1
8	Olivia Addams	1
8	Michał Szczygieł	1
8	Meduza	1
8	James Carter	1
8	Elley Duhé (as featuring)	1
8	Fast Boy (as featuring)	1
8	David Guetta	1
8	Bebe Rexha	1

== See also ==
- Polish music charts
- List of number-one albums of 2022 (Poland)
