= List of number-one singles of 2020 (Poland) =

This is a list of the songs that reached number-one position in official Polish single chart in ZPAV in 2020.

== Chart history ==
Issue date	Song	Artist(s)	Reference(s)
January 4	"Liar"	Camila Cabello	
January 11	"Memories"	Maroon 5	
January 18	"Memories"	Maroon 5	
January 25	"Dom"	Cleo	
February 1	"Désolée (Paris/Paname)"	Shanguy	
February 8	"Blinding Lights"	The Weeknd	
February 15	"Désolée (Paris/Paname)"	Shanguy	
February 22	"Désolée (Paris/Paname)"	Shanguy	
February 29	"Szampan"	Sanah	
March 7	"Blinding Lights"	The Weeknd	
March 14	"Szampan"	Sanah	
March 21	"Szampan"	Sanah	
March 28	"Szampan"	Sanah	
April 4	"Salt"	Ava Max	
April 11	"Salt"	Ava Max	
April 18	"Salt"	Ava Max	
April 25	"Physical"	Dua Lipa	
May 2	"Physical"	Dua Lipa	
May 9	"Numb"	Dotan	
May 16	"Numb"	Dotan	
May 23	"Numb"	Dotan	
May 30	"Feel Me"	Selena Gomez	
June 6	"Numb"	Dotan	
June 13	"In Your Eyes"	The Weeknd	
June 20	"Melodia"	Sanah	
June 27	"Kings & Queens"	Ava Max	
July 4	"Kings & Queens"	Ava Max	
July 11	"Melodia"	Sanah	
July 18	"Melodia"	Sanah	
July 25	"Never Let Me Down"	Vize and Tom Gregory	
August 1	"Never Let Me Down"	Vize and Tom Gregory	
August 8	"Never Let Me Down"	Vize and Tom Gregory	
August 15	"Never Let Me Down"	Vize and Tom Gregory	
August 22	"Świt"	Męskie Granie Orkiestra 2020	
August 29	"Lovefool"	twocolors	
September 5	"Head Shoulders Knees & Toes"	Ofenbach and Quarterhead featuring Norma Jean Martine	
September 12	"Świt"	Męskie Granie Orkiestra 2020	
September 19	"Lovefool"	twocolors	
September 26	"Beautiful Madness"	Michael Patrick Kelly	
October 3	"Head Shoulders Knees & Toes"	Ofenbach and Quarterhead featuring Norma Jean Martine	
October 10	"What's Love Got to Do with It"	Kygo and Tina Turner	
October 17	"No sory"	Sanah	
October 24	"No sory"	Sanah	
October 31	"No sory"	Sanah	
November 7	"No sory"	Sanah	
November 14	"Lubię być z nią"	Baranovski	
November 21	"Hypnotized"	Purple Disco Machine and Sophie and the Giants	
November 28	"Who's Laughing Now"	Ava Max	
December 5	"Who's Laughing Now"	Ava Max	
December 12	"Who's Laughing Now"	Ava Max	
December 19	"Hypnotized"	Purple Disco Machine and Sophie and the Giants	
December 26	"All We Got"	Robin Schulz featuring Kiddo	

== Number-one artists ==
Position	Artist	Weeks at #1
1	Sanah	11
2	Ava Max	8
3	Dotan	4
3	Vize	4
3	Tom Gregory	4
4	Shanguy	3
4	The Weeknd	3
5	Maroon 5	2
5	Dua Lipa	2
5	Męskie Granie Orkiestra 2020	2
5	twocolors	2
5	Ofenbach	2
5	Quarterhead	2
5	Norma Jean Martine (as featuring)	2
5	Purple Disco Machine	2
5	Sophie and the Giants	2
6	Camila Cabello	1
6	Cleo	1
6	Selena Gomez	1
6	Michael Patrick Kelly	1
6	Kygo	1
6	Tina Turner	1
6	Baranovski	1
6	Robin Schulz	1
6	Kiddo (as featuring)	1

== See also ==
- Polish music charts
- List of number-one albums of 2020 (Poland)
