= List of number-one albums of 2024 (Poland) =

This is a list of number-one albums of 2024 in Poland, per the OLiS chart.

== Chart history ==
Issue date	Albums		Physical albums		Streaming albums		Ref.
Issue date	Album	Artist(s)	Album	Artist(s)	Album	Artist(s)	Ref.
January 4	Pierwsza jesień bez depresji	Opał and Jonatan	Pierwsza jesień bez depresji	Opał and Jonatan	Merry Christmas	Mariah Carey	
January 11	PROXL3M	PRO8L3M	Męskie Granie 2023	Various artists	Safe	Gibbs	
January 18	PROXL3M	PRO8L3M	Złota kolekcja: Best of (25 lat)	Various artists	Pleśń	Guzior	
January 25	Depresja	Kartky	Depresja	Kartky	American Dream	21 Savage	
February 1	Deathcore	Chivas	Deathcore	Chivas	Export/Import	Malik Montana	
February 8	Deathcore	Chivas	Anatema	Gedz	Deathcore	Chivas	
February 15	All Day Fresh	Asster	All Day Fresh	Asster	Deathcore	Chivas	
February 22	Vultures 1	Kanye West and Ty Dolla Sign	Deathcore	Chivas	Vultures 1	Kanye West and Ty Dolla Sign	
February 29	Organic Human	Kukon	Organic Human	Kukon	Vultures 1	Kanye West and Ty Dolla Sign	
March 7	Miłość w czasach popkultury	Myslovitz	Miłość w czasach popkultury	Myslovitz	Vultures 1	Kanye West and Ty Dolla Sign	
March 14	Atlas iskier	Karaś/Rogucki	Atlas iskier	Karaś/Rogucki	Vultures 1	Kanye West and Ty Dolla Sign	
March 21	Eternal Sunshine	Ariana Grande	Invincible Shield	Judas Priest	Eternal Sunshine	Ariana Grande	
March 28	Eternal Sunshine	Ariana Grande	Everything I Thought It Was	Justin Timberlake	Eternal Sunshine	Ariana Grande	
April 4	Powrót do światła	Miszel	Powrót do światła	Miszel	We Don't Trust You	Future and Metro Boomin	
April 11	Ostatnie takie emocje	Sarius	Ostatnie takie emocje	Sarius	PG$	Young Leosia and Bambi	
April 18	Tthe Grind	Otsochodzi	Tthe Grind	Otsochodzi	Tthe Grind	Otsochodzi	
April 25	Maze	Mortal	Maze	Mortal	PG$	Young Leosia and Bambi	
May 2	The Tortured Poets Department	Taylor Swift	The Tortured Poets Department	Taylor Swift	PG$	Young Leosia and Bambi	
May 9	Życia weteran	Bonus RPK	Życia weteran	Bonus RPK	PG$	Young Leosia and Bambi	
May 16	Radical Optimism	Dua Lipa	Zapiski z Landary	Kali	PG$	Young Leosia and Bambi	
May 23	Acid Moro	Miły ATZ	Acid Moro	Miły ATZ	PG$	Young Leosia and Bambi	
May 30	Hit Me Hard and Soft	Billie Eilish	Miejskie ptaki	Donguralesko	Hit Me Hard and Soft	Billie Eilish	
June 6	G	Guzior	G	Guzior	Hit Me Hard and Soft	Billie Eilish	
June 13	Hit Me Hard and Soft	Billie Eilish	Hit Me Hard and Soft	Billie Eilish	Hit Me Hard and Soft	Billie Eilish	
June 20	ERA47	Oki	ERA47	Oki	ERA47	Oki	
June 27	04:01	KęKę	04:01	KęKę	Kaprysy	Sanah	
July 4	Kaprysy	Sanah	Kaprysy	Sanah	PG$	Young Leosia and Bambi	
July 11	Polonn	Białas	Polonn	Białas	PG$	Young Leosia and Bambi	
July 18	Styropian	Pidżama Porno	Styropian	Pidżama Porno	PG$	Young Leosia and Bambi	
July 25	Kaprysy	Sanah	Kaprysy	Sanah	PG$	Young Leosia and Bambi	
August 1	Ate	Stray Kids	Ate	Stray Kids	PG$	Young Leosia and Bambi	
August 8	Kaprysy	Sanah	WAWA	Brodka	PG$	Young Leosia and Bambi	
August 15	Kaprysy	Sanah	Kaprysy	Sanah	PG$	Young Leosia and Bambi	
August 22	Kaprysy	Sanah	Kaprysy	Sanah	PG$	Young Leosia and Bambi	
August 29	W związku z muzyką	Sobel	W związku z muzyką	Sobel	PG$	Young Leosia and Bambi	
September 5	W związku z muzyką	Sobel	Kaprysy	Sanah	Short n' Sweet	Sabrina Carpenter	
September 12	Pianinkowe kaprysy	Sanah	Wild God	Nick Cave and the Bad Seeds	PG$	Young Leosia and Bambi	
September 19	Luck and Strange	David Gilmour	Luck and Strange	David Gilmour	PG$	Young Leosia and Bambi	
September 26	04:01	KęKę	04:01	KęKę	PG$	Young Leosia and Bambi	
October 3	Nierówno pod sufitem	Rów Babicze	Nierówno pod sufitem	Rów Babicze	PG$	Young Leosia and Bambi	
October 10	Online and Dzięki	Genzie	Online and Dzięki	Genzie	Hit Me Hard and Soft	Billie Eilish	
October 17	A nie mówiłem?	Kaz Bałagane	A nie mówiłem?	Kaz Bałagane	A nie mówiłem?	Kaz Bałagane	
October 24	Seppuku	Macias and White Widow	1989	Webber and various artists	A nie mówiłem?	Kaz Bałagane	
October 31	A nie mówiłem?	Kaz Bałagane	Wilki z Rapstreet	Pięć Dwa Dębiec	Hit Me Hard and Soft	Billie Eilish	
November 7	In Blanco	Louis Villain	Atypowy	Szpaku	Chromakopia	Tyler, the Creator	
November 14	Po moim trupie	Kazik and Kwartet ProForma	Po moim trupie	Kazik and Kwartet ProForma	Chromakopia	Tyler, the Creator	
November 21	Songs of a Lost World	The Cure	Songs of a Lost World	The Cure	Hit Me Hard and Soft	Billie Eilish	
November 28	Ta druga	Kaśka Sochacka	Ta druga	Kaśka Sochacka	From Zero	Linkin Park	
December 5	Ta druga	Kaśka Sochacka	Ta druga	Kaśka Sochacka	GNX	Kendrick Lamar	
December 12	Męskie Granie 2024	Various artists	Męskie Granie 2024	Various artists	Arcane League of Legends: Season 2 (Soundtrack from the Animated Series)	Arcane	
December 19	Depeche_mood	Peja, Slums Attack and DJ Decks	Depeche_mood	Peja, Slums Attack and DJ Decks	Sen, którego nigdy nie miałem	Kubi Producent	
December 26	Hop	Stray Kids	Hop	Stray Kids	Hit Me Hard and Soft	Billie Eilish	

== See also ==
- List of number-one singles of 2024 (Poland)
