= List of number-one singles of 2021 (Poland) =

This is a list of the songs that reached number-one position in official Polish single chart in ZPAV in 2021.

== Chart history ==
| Issue date | Song | Artist(s) | Reference(s) |
|---|---|---|---|
| January 2 | "All We Got" | Robin Schulz featuring Kiddo | |
| January 9 | "All We Got" | Robin Schulz featuring Kiddo | |
| January 16 | "All We Got" | Robin Schulz featuring Kiddo | |
| January 23 | "All We Got" | Robin Schulz featuring Kiddo | |
| January 30 | "All We Got" | Robin Schulz featuring Kiddo | |
| February 6 | "Worth It" | Gromee featuring Ásdís | |
| February 13 | "Save Your Tears" | The Weeknd | |
| February 20 | "Love Not War (The Tampa Beat)" | Jason Derulo and Nuka | |
| February 27 | "I Was Made" | Vinai and Le Pedre | |
| March 6 | "Ale jazz!" | Sanah and Vito Bambino | |
| March 13 | "Ale jazz!" | Sanah and Vito Bambino | |
| March 20 | "Ale jazz!" | Sanah and Vito Bambino | |
| March 27 | "Ale jazz!" | Sanah and Vito Bambino | |
| April 3 | "Ale jazz!" | Sanah and Vito Bambino | |
| April 10 | "Wasted Love" | Ofenbach featuring Lagique | |
| April 17 | "Friday (Dopamine Re-Edit)" | Riton and Nightcrawlers featuring Mufasa and Hypeman | |
| April 24 | "I Got Me" | Foothills and Badjack featuring Kheela | |
| May 1 | "Where the Lights Are Low" | Toby Romeo, Felix Jaehn and Faulhaber | |
| May 8 | "Lifestyle" | Jason Derulo featuring Adam Levine | |
| May 15 | "Kalima minou" | Shanguy and Mark Neve | |
| May 22 | "Rasputin" | Majestic and Boney M. | |
| May 29 | "Kalima minou" | Shanguy and Mark Neve | |
| June 5 | "Follow You" | Imagine Dragons | |
| June 12 | "Follow You" | Imagine Dragons | |
| June 19 | "Stranger" | Olivia Addams | |
| June 26 | "Stranger" | Olivia Addams | |
| July 3 | "Stranger" | Olivia Addams | |
| July 10 | "Stranger" | Olivia Addams | |
| July 17 | "Stranger" | Olivia Addams | |
| July 24 | "Stranger" | Olivia Addams | |
| July 31 | "Stranger" | Olivia Addams | |
| August 7 | "Bad Habits" | Ed Sheeran | |
| August 14 | "Bad Habits" | Ed Sheeran | |
| August 21 | "Bad Habits" | Ed Sheeran | |
| August 28 | "I Ciebie też, bardzo" | Męskie Granie Orkiestra 2021 | |
| September 4 | "I Ciebie też, bardzo" | Męskie Granie Orkiestra 2021 | |
| September 11 | "Bad Habits" | Ed Sheeran | |
| September 18 | "I Ciebie też, bardzo" | Męskie Granie Orkiestra 2021 | |
| September 25 | "I Ciebie też, bardzo" | Męskie Granie Orkiestra 2021 | |
| October 2 | "Proste" | Dawid Kwiatkowski | |
| October 9 | "Ten stan" | Sanah | |
| October 16 | "Ten stan" | Sanah | |
| October 23 | "Stay" | The Kid Laroi and Justin Bieber | |
| October 30 | "Stay" | The Kid Laroi and Justin Bieber | |
| November 6 | "Cold Heart (Pnau remix)" | Elton John and Dua Lipa | |
| November 13 | "Cold Heart (Pnau remix)" | Elton John and Dua Lipa | |
| November 20 | "Cold Heart (Pnau remix)" | Elton John and Dua Lipa | |
| November 27 | "Where Are You Now" | Lost Frequencies and Calum Scott | |
| December 4 | "Paranoia" | Daria | |
| December 11 | "Paranoia" | Daria | |
| December 18 | "Paranoia" | Daria | |
| December 25 | "Paranoia" | Daria | |

== Number-one artists ==
| Position | Artist | Weeks at #1 |
|---|---|---|
| 1 | Olivia Addams | 7 |
| 1 | Sanah | 7 |
| 2 | Robin Schulz | 5 |
| 2 | Kiddo (as featuring) | 5 |
| 2 | Vito Bambino | 5 |
| 3 | Ed Sheeran | 4 |
| 3 | Męskie Granie Orkiestra 2021 | 4 |
| 3 | Daria | 4 |
| 4 | Elton John | 3 |
| 4 | Dua Lipa | 3 |
| 5 | Jason Derulo | 2 |
| 5 | Shanguy | 2 |
| 5 | Mark Neve | 2 |
| 5 | Imagine Dragons | 2 |
| 5 | The Kid Laroi | 2 |
| 5 | Justin Bieber | 2 |
| 6 | Gromee | 1 |
| 6 | Ásdís (as featuring) | 1 |
| 6 | The Weeknd | 1 |
| 6 | Nuka | 1 |
| 6 | Vinai | 1 |
| 6 | Le Pedre | 1 |
| 6 | Ofenbach | 1 |
| 6 | Lagique (as featuring) | 1 |
| 6 | Riton | 1 |
| 6 | Nightcrawlers | 1 |
| 6 | Mufasa (as featuring) | 1 |
| 6 | Hypeman (as featuring) | 1 |
| 6 | Foothills | 1 |
| 6 | Badjack | 1 |
| 6 | Kheela (as featuring) | 1 |
| 6 | Toby Romeo | 1 |
| 6 | Felix Jaehn | 1 |
| 6 | Faulhaber | 1 |
| 6 | Adam Levine | 1 |
| 6 | Majestic | 1 |
| 6 | Boney M. | 1 |
| 6 | Dawid Kwiatkowski | 1 |
| 6 | Lost Frequencies | 1 |
| 6 | Calum Scott | 1 |

== See also ==
- Polish music charts
- List of number-one albums of 2021 (Poland)
