= List of number-one albums of 2022 (Poland) =

This is a list of number-one albums of 2022 in Poland, per the OLiS chart.

== Chart history ==
Issue date	Album	Artist(s)	Reference
January 6	Młody Matczak	Mata	
January 13	Arogant	Fokus	
January 20	Królowa dram	Sanah	
January 27	Królowa dram	Sanah	
February 3	Z Archiwum X2	Dwa Sławy	
February 10	Na żywo	TPS	
February 17	Brzydkie	Szymi Szyms	
February 24	Księga jesiennych demonów	Kartky	
March 3	Hotel Maffija 2	SB Maffija	
March 10	Rock Believer	Scorpions	
March 17	The War to End All Wars	Sabaton	
March 24	Bufor	Jan-rapowanie	
March 31	Oddinary	Stray Kids	
April 7	Forza	Tuzza	
April 14	Dom dla zmyślonych przyjaciół pana Mateusza	Szpaku	
April 21	Rough n' Gentle	Kukon	
April 28	Uczta	Sanah	
May 5	Uczta	Sanah	
May 12	Bóg nie gra w kości	Małpa	
May 19	Uczta	Sanah	
May 26	Uczta	Sanah	
June 2	Harry's House	Harry Styles	
June 9	Uczta	Sanah	
June 16	H4J4	H4J4	
June 23	Proof	BTS	
June 30	Ostatni taniec	Kizo	
July 7	Pretty Boy	White 2115	
July 14	King Kong	Kabe and Opiat	
July 21	Uczta	Sanah	
July 28	Uczta	Sanah	
August 4	Uczta	Sanah	
August 11	Uczta	Sanah	
August 18	Tarcho Terror	Otsochodzi	
August 25	Diabeł stróż	Bonson	
September 1	Uczta	Sanah	
September 8	Dopehouse Mixtape	Gibbs	
September 15	Dopehouse Mixtape	Gibbs	
September 22	Syn wschodu	Lukasyno	
September 29	Opvs Contra Natvram	Behemoth	
October 6	O jeden most za daleko	Nocny Kochanek	
October 13	Muzyka komercyjna	Pezet	
October 20	Maxident	Stray Kids	
October 27	Miłostki	Julia Żugaj	
November 3	Lata dwudzieste	Dawid Podsiadło	
November 10	Never Ending Sorry	Agnieszka Chylińska	
November 17	042 Requiem	O.S.T.R.	
November 24	Lata dwudzieste	Dawid Podsiadło	
December 1	Notatki z marginesu	Young Igi	
December 8	Sanah śpiewa poezyje	Sanah	
December 15	Lata dwudzieste	Dawid Podsiadło	
December 22	Sanah śpiewa poezyje	Sanah	
December 29	Rodzinny biznes	2115	

== See also ==
- List of number-one singles of 2022 (Poland)
