= List of number-one albums of 2021 (Poland) =

This is a list of number-one albums of 2021 in Poland, per the OLiS chart.

== Chart history ==
Issue date	Album	Artist(s)	Reference
January 7	Męskie Granie 2020	Various artists	
January 14	Siesta XVI	Various artists	
January 21	Muzyka współczesna	Pezet	
January 28	Rewolucja romantyczna	Bedoes	
February 4	Różowa pantera	Szpaku	
February 11	Ziomalski Mixtape	Żabson	
February 18	Mogło być nic	Kwiat Jabłoni	
February 25	Love	Michael Bublé	
March 4	Niepewne jutro	Joda	
March 11	MTV Unplugged	Brodka	
March 18	Game Plan	Nizioł	
March 25	Blady król	Bisz and Kosa	
April 1	Chemtrails over the Country Club	Lana Del Rey	
April 8	Fight Club	PRO8L3M	
April 15	Fight Club	PRO8L3M	
April 22	Fight Club	PRO8L3M	
April 29	Pułapka na motyle	Sobel	
May 6	Siara	KęKę	
May 13	Janusz Walczuk	Janusz Walczuk	
May 20	Irenka	Sanah	
May 27	Klepsydra	Major SPZ	
June 3	Akademia sztuk pięknych	Avi and Louis Villain	
June 10	Ostatnia płyta	Kult	
June 17	Red Pill	Kacper HTA	
June 24	Diamentowy las	Białas and White 2115	
July 1	Ka$ablanca	Tede and Sir Michu	
July 8	Sezon 3	Ekipa	
July 15	Od końca do początku	Hinol Polska Wersja	
July 22	Butter	BTS	
July 29	Irenka	Sanah	
August 5	Irenka	Sanah	
August 12	Happier Than Ever	Billie Eilish	
August 19	Ostatnia płyta	Kult	
August 26	Kraina lodu	Kartky	
September 2	Irenka	Sanah	
September 9	Cock.0z Mixtape	Kaz Bałagane	
September 16	BYQ	Małach	
September 23	Ave Maria	Maria Peszek	
September 30	Nevermind	Nirvana	
October 7	Hulanki	Young Leosia	
October 14	Młody Matczak	Mata	
October 21	Młody Matczak	Mata	
October 28	Młody Matczak	Mata	
November 4	Jeszcze pięć minut	Kizo	
November 11	Ballady i protesty	Fisz Emade Tworzywo	
November 18	Irenka	Sanah	
November 25	Eroizm	Ero	
December 2	Nic	Sokół	
December 9	30	Adele	
December 16	Leśna muzyka (live, czyli na żywo)	Dawid Podsiadło	
December 23	Męskie Granie 2021	Various artists	
December 30	Męskie Granie 2021	Various artists	

== See also ==
- List of number-one singles of 2021 (Poland)
