= List of number-one albums of 2020 (Poland) =

This is a list of number-one albums of 2020 in Poland, per the OLiS chart.

== Chart history ==
Issue date	Album	Artist(s)	Reference
January 2	Męskie Granie 2019	Various artists	
January 9	Borcrew album	Borcrew	
January 16	The Best of 2019	Various artists	
January 23	Live in Prague	Hans Zimmer	
January 30	100 dni do matury	Mata	
February 6	Pokolenie X2	Dwa Sławy	
February 13	Love Jazz & the City. Essential Edition	Various artists	
February 20	W poszukiwaniu siebie	Zeus	
February 27	Disco Marek	Kruszwil	
March 5	Map of the Soul: 7	BTS	
March 12	Gniew	O.S.T.R.	
March 19	Art Brut 2	PRO8L3M	
March 26	Art Brut 2	PRO8L3M	
April 2	Szkoła 81	Płomień 81	
April 9	2050	Peja, Slums Attack and Magiera	
April 16	Romantic Psycho	Quebonafide	
April 23	Romantic Psycho	Quebonafide	
April 30	Śpiewnik domowy	Łona and Webber	
May 7	Romantic Psycho	Quebonafide	
May 14	Romantic Psycho	Quebonafide	
May 21	Królowa dram	Sanah	
May 28	Romantic Psycho	Quebonafide	
June 4	Dziadzior	Donguralesko	
June 11	Disco Noir	Tede and Sir Michu	
June 18	Zaraza	Kazik	
June 25	Zaraza	Kazik	
July 2	Zaraza	Kazik	
July 9	Selfmade	TPS	
July 16	Helsinki	Daria Zawiałow	
July 23	Bravo Hits Lato 2020	Various artists	
July 30	Bravo Hits Lato 2020	Various artists	
August 6	Mixtape Vol. 6	DJ Decks	
August 13	H8M5	Białas	
August 20	H8M5	Białas	
August 27	H8M5	Białas	
September 3	H8M5	Białas	
September 10	Rockstar: Do zachodu słońca	White 2115	
September 17	Jarmark	Taco Hemingway	
September 24	Black Album	Peja and Slums Attack	
October 1	Hotel Maffija	SB Maffija	
October 8	Anno Domini MMXX	Luxtorpeda	
October 15	Empik prezentuje: Best Polish Songs	Various artists	
October 22	Mixtape 7	DJ Decks	
October 29	Mantra	Kacper HTA and Fonos	
November 5	?	Kamerzysta	
November 12	S&M	Metallica	
November 19	Live Pol'and'Rock Festival 2019	Kult	
November 26	Live Pol'and'Rock Festival 2019	Kult	
December 3	Be	BTS	
December 10	Nadciśnienie	Paluch	
December 17	Pleśń	Guzior	
December 24	HAO2	O.S.T.R. and Hades	

== See also ==
- List of number-one singles of 2020 (Poland)
