= Olivia Addams =

Romanian singer-songwriter (born 1996)

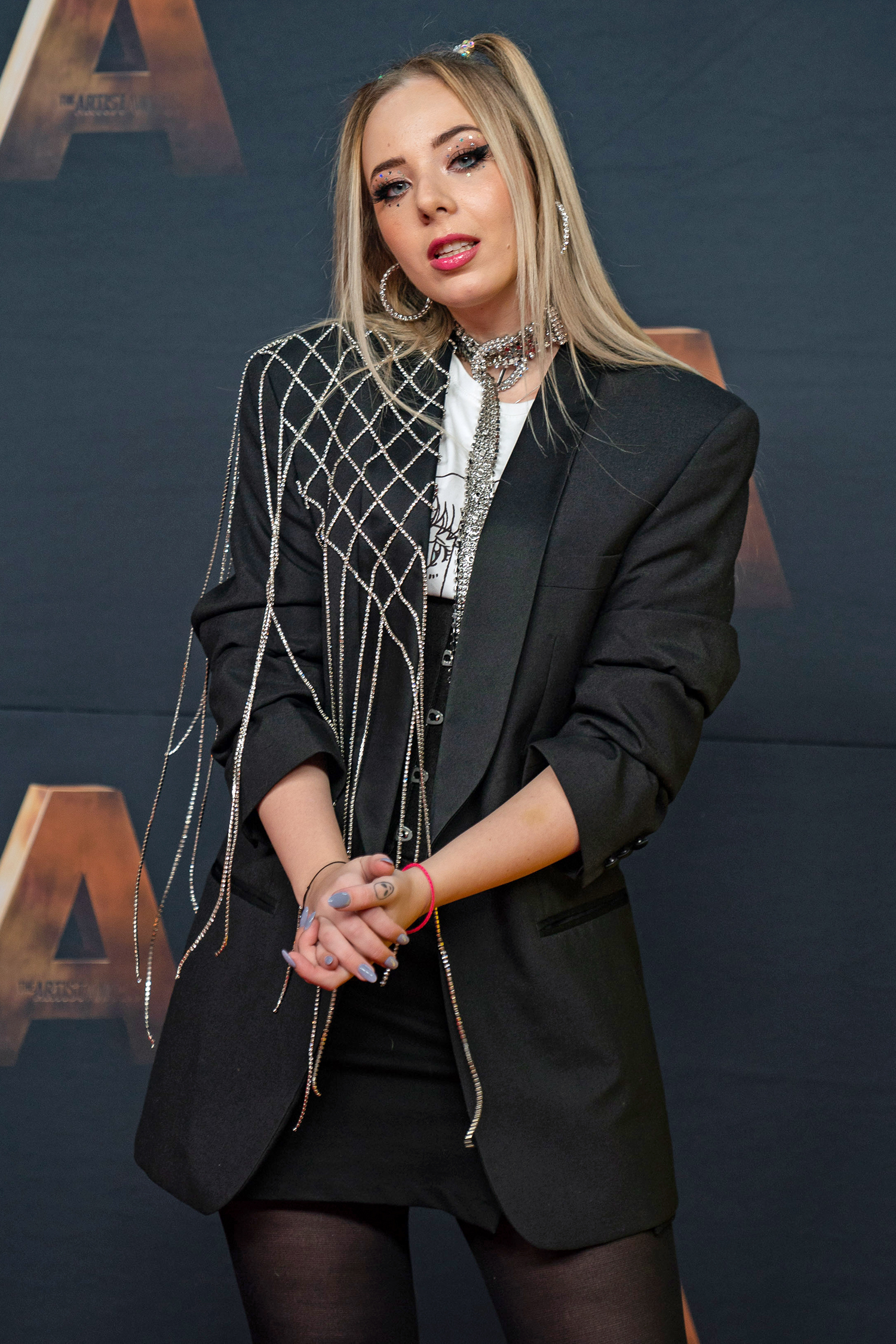
- Addams at The Artist Awards, 2020
- Born: Adriana Livia Opriș; 17 September 1996 (age 29); Bucharest, Romania
- Occupations: Singer; Songwriter; Producer; YouTuber; TikToker
- Years active: 2018–present
- Musical career
- Genres: Pop music; Electronic
- Labels: MusicTap; Creator Records; Ultra Records; Global

Adriana Livia Opriș (born 17 September 1996), known professionally as Olivia Addams, is a Romanian singer, songwriter, and member of the band Jealous Friend. She gained popularity in 2020 after releasing the single "Dumb".

== Early life and career ==
=== 1996–2017: Childhood years. The first musical activities ===
Adriana Livia Opriș was born in Bucharest, Romania. Her mother is a lawyer and her father is an accountant. At the age of three, she began singing in the Allegretto Children Choir from Bucharest. For the next fourteen years, she travelled the world with the children's choir and performed in many countries, including Japan, the United States, China, Singapore, Mexico, and all over Europe. Olivia studied for a year in Germany because she wanted to learn German and then returned to Romania and continued her faculty and master's degree also in German.

=== 2018-2021 ===
In 2018 Olivia Addams appeared in Pete Kingsman's single "Love Poison". In 2019 the singer recorded her first solo single, called "Sick Lullaby". The song was widely broadcast in the Commonwealth of Independent States and became a hit in Ukraine. In the same year, she joined the Jealous Friend band, with whom in 2019 she recorded three songs: "Who's Gonna Love You" (with Jesse Zagata), "In My Mind", and "Cold".

Olivia Addams' first single in 2020 was "I'm Lost" and was followed by "Dumb". It got to the Polish music charts in the 9th position. In August 2020, it released the single "Fish in the Sea". In the same year, she recorded three songs with the Jealous Friend band: "Wanna Say Hi" (with Bastian), "Himalayas" (with Tobi Ibitoye) and "To The Moon And Back". In November 2020, she released a single "Are We There?" through which the awareness-raising efforts and the fight against bullying continue. In December 2020, she released a Christmas single entitled "Merry Tik Tok" with Romanian dacer Emil Rengle.

On April 16, 2021, Olivia Addams released the single "Stranger" through Global Records and Creator Records. The single performed well in the Commonwealth of Independent States. Also, in April 2021, she released the single "Believe" with the Jealous Friend band.

In May 2021, Addams was invited to Poland. During this trip, she gave an interview to Paulina Krupińska and Damian Michałowski in the program Dzień Dobry TVN and was invited to Radio Eska, Radio Zet and 4fun.tv. She also sang in a duet with Sanah in her song "Invisible Dress".

On June 24, 2021, she released together the single "Heart Attack" with Romanian band Akcent. The music and lyrics of the song were created by Achim Marian, Adrian Sînă, Andreas Öberg, George Papagheorghe and Olivia Addams.

Starting in 2021, she was a juror with Speak and Marius Moga at Hit Play, the first music show made by Vodafone and broadcast exclusively on the Internet, and which aims to find the next music star in Romania.

== Discography ==
=== Singles ===
As lead artist

Title	Year	Peak chart positions										Certifications	Album
Title	Year	POL		CIS		UKR			ROU			Certifications	Album
Title	Year	Airplay	TV	Radio	Radio & YouTube	Radio	Radio & YouTube	Kyiv Radio	Airplay	Radio	TV	Certifications	Album
"Sick Lullaby"	2019	—	—	—	—	—	—	—	—	—	—		Non-album single
"I'm Lost"	2020	—	—	—	—	—	—	—	—	—	—		Non-album single
"Dumb"	2020	9	—	123	—	—	—	—	13	4	7		Non-album single
"Fish in the Sea"	2020	—	—	—	—	—	—	—	—	—	—		Non-album single
"Are We There?"	2020	2	4	—	—	—	—	—	30	—	—		Non-album single
"Merry Tik Tok" (with Emil Rengle)	2020	—	—	—	—	—	—	—	—	—	—		Non-album single
"Stranger"	2021	1	4	52	343	3	16	4	40	—	—	ZPAV: Platinum	Non-album single
"Heart Attack" (with Akcent)	2021	16	—	355	—	—	—	—	—	—	—		Non-album single
"Chameleon"	2021	—	—	—	—	—	—	—	—	—	—		Non-album single
"Broken" (with Gromee)	2021	95	—	—	—	—	—	—	—	—	—		Non-album single
"Scrisori în minor"	2022	—	—	—	—	—	—	—	—	—	—		Non-album single
"Never Say Never"	2022	3	2	—	—	—	—	—	—	—	—	ZPAV: Gold	Non-album single
"Răsărit perfect"	2022	—	—	—	—	—	—	—	8	2	6		Non-album single
"Fool Me Once"	2022	1	—	—	—	—	—	—	—	—	—		Non-album single
"—" denotes a recording that did not chart or was not released in that territory.

Promotional singles

Title	Year
„În Golul Tău (Live Session)” (with Holy Molly and The Motans)	2021

=== Songs for other artists ===
Year	Author	Title	Peak chart positions			Notes
Year	Author	Title	ROU			Notes
Year	Author	Title	Airplay	Radio	TV	Notes
2018	Antonia, featuring Erik Frank	"Matame"	2	1	1	music, lyric
2019	Jo	"Rapitor"	69	—	—	lyric
2020	Cleopatra Stratan	"La usa mea"	—	—	—	music, production, lyric
2020	Lizot, Holy Molly and Alex Parker	"Back To Her"	—	—	—	music, lyric
2020	Iarina	"Cry"	—	—	—	music, lyric
2021	Antonia and Yoss Bones	"Dinero"	41	—	—	music, lyrics
"—" denotes a recording that did not chart or was not released in that territory.

=== Music videos ===
Title	Year	Director	Production	Ref.
As lead artist
"Sick Lullaby"	2019	N/A	Marius Dia, Alex Parker	
"I'm Lost"	2020	Isabella Szanto	Marius Dia, Alex Parker, Bogdan Zamonea	
"Dumb"	2020	Isabella Szanto	Creator Records, Loops Production	
"Dumb" (Vertical Video Live Session)	2020	N/A	Creator Records	
"Fish in the Sea" (Lyric Video)	2020	Isabella Szanto	Alex Parker, Bogdan Zamonea	
"Are We There?"	2020	Isabella Szanto	Marius Dia, Alex Parker	
"Merry Tik Tok"	2020	Emil Rengle	REALM	
"Stranger"	2021	Isabella Szanto, Roberto Stan	Bogdan Zamonea, Cristian Puchiu	
As featured artist
"Bandida"	2019	N/A	Alex Volintiru	
"Love Games"	2019	N/A	Alex Parker	
