= Goya (band) =

Polish pop music group

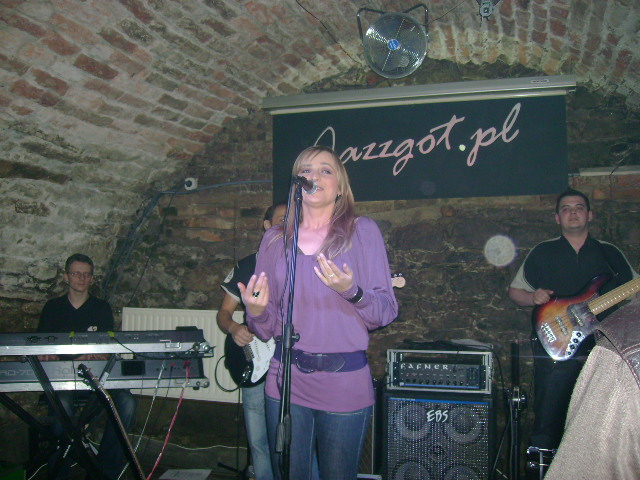

Background information
- Origin: Warsaw, Poland
- Genres: Pop
- Years active: 1995-Present
- Labels: EMI Music Poland, Universal Music Poland
- Members: Magdalena Wójcik; Grzegorz Jędrach; Rafał Gorączkowski; Łukasz Dudewicz; Rafał Klimczuk

Goya is a Polish pop music group founded 1995 in Warsaw.

== History ==
The group was created in 1995 in the Polish capital of Warsaw. Magdalena Wójcik is the lead singer and face of the group. Magdalena Wojcik participated in numerous amateur activities in music, singing and playing guitar from a high school age. In 1993 she released her own album which was published on cassette by the publisher Dalmafon.

Magdalena Wójcik caught the attention of the director of music publisher EMI, and he offered her a contract. Living in Warsaw at the time, she co-operated with the musicians Grzegorz Jędrach (guitarist), and Rafał Gorączowski (Keyboardist).

Goya made their debut in 1995 with the album Goya, from which was released three singles: Bo ya, Śpij i śnij and Kupię sobie dom.

The band set up their own studio, in which they slowly began to prepare for new material. One of the first tracks produced was a cover of the widely known Nirvana song Smells Like Teen Spirit. In 2002 they went to the Chart List of a Polish radio program with their second album Kawałek po kawałku which was released early spring 2003. It was promoted with three singles: Będę się starać, Jeśli będę taka and the title song Kawałek po kawałku.

Their third album Smak słów was premiered 5 March 2005. The record spawned two singles: Smak słów and Mój. The second single qualified for the competition in Sopot. Like its predecessor, the album was re-released as a special edition with new remixes, video clips, and the release of a specially prepared single for the Polish film of the same name, Tylko mnie kochaj. The single reached #1 in Poland.

On 23 March 2007, Goya's fourth album Horyzont zdarzeń. The album was made with a unique atmosphere and sound that is now the signature sound of the band, which distinguishes it from other Polish music. From the album the singles W zasięgu Twego wzroku, Piękny czas and Dobre sny were released.

In 2009 Goya released their fifth album, titled Od wschodu do zachodu. The initial single Jutro obudź mnie was released. The second single was titled Codzienność.

== Discography ==
Title	Album details	Peak chart positions
Title	Album details	POL
Goya	Released: 1998; Label: Pomaton EMI; Formats: CD, digital download	—
Kawałek po kawałku	Released: June 23, 2003; Label: Pomaton EMI; Formats: CD, digital download	—
Smak słów	Released: March 7, 2005; Label: Pomaton EMI; Formats: CD, digital download	8
Horyzont zdarzeń	Released: March 26, 2007; Label: EMI Music Poland; Formats: CD, digital download	8
Od wschodu do zachodu	Released: May 18, 2009; Label: EMI Music Poland; Formats: CD, digital download	29
Chwile	Released: April 17, 2012; Label: Universal Music Poland; Formats: CD, digital download	29
"—" denotes a recording that did not chart or was not released in that territory.
