= Irenka =

Studio album by Sanah
- Released: 7 May 2021
- Genre: Electropop; indie pop
- Length: 41:00
- Language: Polish
- Label: Magic; Universal
- Producer: Thomas Martin Leithead-Docherty (Tom Martin); Edward Leithead-Docherty; Jakub Galiński; Arkadiusz Kopera; Mariusz Obijalski; Paul Whalley; Dominic Buczkowski-Wojtaszek; Patryk Kumór

Sanah chronology
Bujda (2020)	Irenka (2021)	Uczta (2022)

Singles from Irenka
- 1. "Ale jazz!" Released: 14 January 2021; 2. "2:00" Released: 26 March 2021; 3. "Etc. (na disco)" Released: 30 April 2021; 4. "Ten stan" Released: August 2021

Singles from Irenka (Final edition)
- 1. "Cześć, jak się masz?" Released: 11 October 2021; 2. "Kolońska i szlugi" Released: 29 October 2021

Irenka (English: Irene) is the second studio album by Polish singer Sanah. It was released by Magic Records and Universal Music Polska on 7 May 2021.

Irenka is a combination of electropop and indie pop. In addition to new tracks, the album also includes six songs previously included on her second extended play Bujda (2020). The album was produced by Thomas Martin Leithead-Docherty (Tom Martin), Edward Leithead-Docherty, Jakub Galiński, Arkadiusz Kopera, Mariusz Obijalski and Paul Whalley.

It peaked at number one on the Polish albums chart and has been certified two-times diamond. Three singles preceded the album's release; "Ale jazz!", the album's lead single, "2:00" and "Etc. (na disco)". "Ten stan" was announced as the album's fourth single. "Cześć, jak się masz?" and "Kolońska i szlugi" only appears on the Final edition of Irenka.

== Track listing ==
Irenka – Physical standard edition
No.	Title	Writer(s)	Producer(s)	Length
1.	"Puk puk"	Zuzanna Jurczak; Tom Martin	Martin	1:03
2.	"Co ja robię tutaj"	Jurczak; Magdalena Wójcik; Martin; Edward Martin Leithead-Docherty	Martin; E. Leithead-Docherty	2:46
3.	"No sory (to dłuższe)"	Jurczak; Jakub Galiński	Galiński	4:23
4.	"To koniec"	Jurczak; Wójcik; Martin; E. Leithead-Docherty	Martin; E. Leithead-Docherty	3:15
5.	"Warcaby"	Jurczak; Wójcik; Galiński	Galiński	3:43
6.	"2:00"	Jurczak; Wójcik; Martin; E. Leithead-Docherty	Martin; E. Leithead-Docherty	3:19
7.	"Interludium"	Jurczak	Martin	0:45
8.	"Irenka"	Jurczak; Mateusz Dopieralski; Martin; E. Leithead-Docherty	Martin; E. Leithead-Docherty	3:33
9.	"Bujda (większa!)"	Jurczak; Wójcik; Martin; E. Leithead-Docherty	Martin	3:27
10.	"Wars"	Jurczak; Galiński	Galiński	2:43
11.	"Etc."	Jurczak; Wójcik; Arkadiusz Kopera; Mariusz Obijalski	Kopera; Obijalski	3:08
12.	"Ten stan"	Jurczak; Wójcik; Martin; E. Leithead-Docherty	Martin	3:45
13.	"Ale jazz!" (with Vito Bambino)	Jurczak; Wójcik; Dopieralski; Galiński	Galiński	3:07
14.	"To był dobry dzień"	Jurczak; Martin; E. Leithead-Docherty	Martin; E. Leithead-Docherty	2:03
Total length:				41:00

Irenka – Physical deluxe edition
No.	Title	Writer(s)	Producer(s)	Length
15.	"Etc. (na disco)"	Jurczak; Wójcik; Kopera; Obijalski	Kopera; Obijalski	3:08
16.	"Oczy"	Jurczak; Wójcik; Galiński	Galiński	3:50
17.	"Duszki"	Jurczak; Wójcik; Paul Whalley	Whalley	3:45
18.	"Pożal się Boże"	Jurczak; Thomas Martin Leithead-Docherty; E. Leithead-Docherty	T. Leithead-Docherty, E. Leithead-Docherty	3:36
19.	"No sory" (alternative version)	Jurczak; Galiński	Galiński	4:29
20.	"Kapela gra"	Jurczak; Wójcik; Kopera; Obijalski	Kopera; Obijalski	3:36
Total length:				63:24

Irenka – Digital standard edition
No.	Title	Writer(s)	Producer(s)	Length
1.	"Puk puk"	Zuzanna Jurczak; Tom Martin	Martin	1:03
2.	"Co ja robię tutaj"	Jurczak; Magdalena Wójcik; Martin; Edward Martin Leithead-Docherty	Martin; E. Leithead-Docherty	2:46
3.	"No sory (to dłuższe)"	Jurczak; Jakub Galiński	Galiński	4:23
4.	"To koniec"	Jurczak; Wójcik; Martin; E. Leithead-Docherty	Martin; E. Leithead-Docherty	3:15
5.	"Warcaby"	Jurczak; Wójcik; Galiński	Galiński	3:43
6.	"2:00"	Jurczak; Wójcik; Martin; E. Leithead-Docherty	Martin; E. Leithead-Docherty	3:19
7.	"Interludium"	Jurczak	Martin	0:45
8.	"Irenka"	Jurczak; Mateusz Dopieralski; Martin; E. Leithead-Docherty	Martin; E. Leithead-Docherty	3:33
9.	"Bujda (większa!)"	Jurczak; Wójcik; Martin; E. Leithead-Docherty	Martin	3:27
10.	"Wars"	Jurczak; Galiński	Galiński	2:43
11.	"Etc."	Jurczak; Wójcik; Kopera; Obijalski	Kopera; Obijalski	3:08
12.	"Ten stan"	Jurczak; Wójcik; Martin; E. Leithead-Docherty	Martin	3:45
13.	"Ale jazz!" (with Vito Bambino)	Jurczak; Wójcik; Dopieralski; Galiński	Galiński	3:07
14.	"To był dobry dzień"	Jurczak; Martin; E. Leithead-Docherty	Martin; E. Leithead-Docherty	2:03
15.	"Etc. (na disco)"	Jurczak; Wójcik; Kopera; Obijalski	Kopera; Obijalski	3:08
16.	"Oczy"	Jurczak; Wójcik; Galiński	Galiński	3:50
17.	"Duszki"	Jurczak; Wójcik; Whalley	Whalley	3:45
18.	"Pożal się Boże"	Jurczak; T. Leithead-Docherty, E. Leithead-Docherty	T. Leithead-Docherty, E. Leithead-Docherty	3:36
19.	"No sory" (alternative version)	Jurczak; Galiński	Galiński	4:29
20.	"Kapela gra"	Jurczak; Wójcik; Kopera; Obijalski	Kopera; Obijalski	3:36
Total length:				63:24

Irenka – Digital final edition
No.	Title	Writer(s)	Producer(s)	Length
1.	"Puk puk"	Jurczak; Martin	Martin	1:03
2.	"Co ja robię tutaj"	Jurczak; Wójcik; Martin; E. Leithead-Docherty	Martin; E. Leithead-Docherty	2:46
3.	"No sory (to dłuższe)"	Jurczak; Galiński	Galiński	4:23
4.	"To koniec"	Jurczak; Wójcik; Martin; E. Leithead-Docherty	Martin; E. Leithead-Docherty	3:15
5.	"Warcaby"	Jurczak; Wójcik; Galiński	Galiński	3:43
6.	"2:00"	Jurczak; Wójcik; Martin; E. Leithead-Docherty	Martin; E. Leithead-Docherty	3:19
7.	"Interludium"	Jurczak	Martin	0:45
8.	"Irenka"	Jurczak; Dopieralski; Martin; E. Leithead-Docherty	Martin; E. Leithead-Docherty	3:33
9.	"Bujda (większa!)"	Jurczak; Wójcik; Martin; E. Leithead-Docherty	Martin	3:27
10.	"Wars"	Jurczak; Galiński	Galiński	2:43
11.	"Etc."	Jurczak; Wójcik; Kopera; Obijalski	Kopera; Obijalski	3:08
12.	"Ten stan"	Jurczak; Wójcik; Martin; E. Leithead-Docherty	Martin	3:45
13.	"Ale jazz!" (with Vito Bambino)	Jurczak; Wójcik; Dopieralski; Galiński	Galiński	3:07
14.	"To był dobry dzień"	Jurczak; Martin; E. Leithead-Docherty	Martin; E. Leithead-Docherty	2:03
15.	"Etc. (na disco)"	Jurczak; Wójcik; Kopera; Obijalski	Kopera; Obijalski	3:08
16.	"Oczy"	Jurczak; Wójcik; Galiński	Galiński	3:50
17.	"Duszki"	Jurczak; Wójcik; Whalley	Whalley	3:45
18.	"Pożal się Boże"	Jurczak; T. Leithead-Docherty, E. Leithead-Docherty	T. Leithead-Docherty, E. Leithead-Docherty	3:36
19.	"No sory" (alternative version)	Jurczak; Galiński	Galiński	4:29
20.	"Kapela gra"	Jurczak; Wójcik; Kopera; Obijalski	Kopera; Obijalski	3:36
21.	"Kolońska i szlugi (do snu)"	Jurczak; Galiński	Kopera	3:23
22.	"Cześć, jak się masz?" (with Sobel)	Jurczak; Szymon Sobel; Dominic Buczkowski-Wojtaszek; Patryk Kumór; Aleksander Kowalski; Martin	Buczkowski-Wojtaszek; Kumór; Martin	3:21
23.	"Wszystko mi mówi, że mnie ktoś pokochał"	Wojciech Młynarski; Andrzej Zieliński	Martin	2:50
24.	"Kaziu, zakochaj się" (live from Radio ZET)	Jeremi Przybora; Jerzy Wasowski		2:37
25.	"Ale jazz! (na jazzowo)"	Jurczak; Wójcik; Dopieralski; Galiński	Galiński	2:36
26.	"2:00 (prod. Arkadiusz)"	Jurczak; Wójcik; Martin; E. Leithead-Docherty	Kopera	6:06
27.	"Kolońska i szlugi"	Jurczak; Galiński	Galiński	3:55
Total length:				1:28:12

== Charts ==
=== Weekly charts ===
Weekly sales chart performance for Irenka
Chart (2021)	Peak position
Polish Albums (ZPAV)	1

=== Year-end charts ===
2021 year-end chart performance for Irenka
Chart (2021)	Position
Polish Albums (ZPAV)	1

2022 year-end chart performance for Irenka
Chart (2022)	Position
Polish Albums (ZPAV)	3

2023 year-end chart performance for Irenka
Chart (2023)	Position
Polish Albums (ZPAV)	17

2024 year-end chart performance for Irenka
Chart (2024)	Position
Polish Albums (ZPAV)	68

== Certifications ==
Certifications and sales for Irenka
Region	Certification	Certified units/sales
Poland (ZPAV)	2× Diamond	300,000^{‡}
^{‡} Sales+streaming figures based on certification alone.

== Release history ==
Release formats for Irenka
Region	Date	Format(s)	Edition(s)	Label(s)	Ref.
Various	7 May 2021	CD; LP; digital download; streaming; box set	Standard; deluxe	Magic; Universal	
Various	4 November 2021	CD; digital download; streaming	Final	Magic; Universal	

== See also ==
- List of number-one albums of 2021 (Poland)
