= Uczta =

Studio album by Sanah
- Released: 15 April 2022
- Genre: Indie pop
- Length: 36:54
- Language: Polish
- Label: Magic; Universal
- Producer: Paweł Odoszewski; Dominic Buczkowski-Wojtaszek; Patryk Kumór; Jakub Dąbrowski; Marek Dziedzic; Arkadiusz Kopera; Jakub Galiński

Sanah chronology
Irenka (2021)	Uczta (2022)	Sanah śpiewa poezyje (2022)

Singles from Uczta
- 1. "Mamo tyś płakała" Released: 8 March 2022; 2. "Szary świat" Released: 17 March 2022; 3. "Czesława" Released: 21 March 2022; 4. "Tęsknię sobie" Released: 24 March 2022; 5. "Audi" Released: 28 March 2022; 6. "Sen we śnie" Released: 31 March 2022; 7. "Baczyński (Pisz do mnie listy)" Released: 4 April 2022; 8. "Eldorado" Released: 7 April 2022; 9. "Oscar" Released: 11 April 2022; 10. "Ostatnia nadzieja" Released: 14 April 2022; 11. "Święty Graal" Released: 14 April 2022

Uczta (English: Feast) is the third studio album by Polish singer Sanah. It was released by Magic Records and Universal Music Polska on 15 April 2022.

Uczta is a combination of indie pop. The album was produced by Paweł Odoszewski, Dominic Buczkowski-Wojtaszek, Patryk Kumór, Jakub Dąbrowski, Marek Dziedzic, Arkadiusz Kopera and Jakub Galiński.

It peaked at number one on the Polish albums chart and has been certified two-times diamond by the Polish Society of the Phonographic Industry (ZPAV) on 24 April 2024.

== Track listing ==
Uczta – Physical standard edition
No.	Title	Writer(s)	Producer(s)	Length
1.	"Czesława" (with Natalia Grosiak)	Zuzanna Jurczak; Natalia Grosiak	Jakub Dąbrowski	4:23
2.	"Szary świat" (with Kwiat Jabłoni)	Jurczak	Dominic Buczkowski-Wojtaszek; Patryk Kumór	3:24
3.	"Sen we śnie" (with Grzegorz Turnau)	Edgar Allan Poe; Jurczak	Arkadiusz Kopera	3:26
4.	"Tęsknię sobie" (with Artur Rojek)	Jurczak; Artur Rojek	Marek Dziedzic	4:49
5.	"Ostatnia nadzieja" (with Dawid Podsiadło)	Jurczak; Dawid Podsiadło; Jakub Galiński	Galiński	3:45
6.	"Mamo tyś płakała" (with Igor Herbut)	Jurczak; Igor Herbut	Paweł Odoszewski	3:00
7.	"Eldorado" (with Daria Zawiałow)	Jurczak; Daria Zawiałow; Kopera	Kopera	4:11
8.	"Baczyński (Pisz do mnie listy)" (with Ania Dąbrowska)	Krzysztof Kamil Baczyński; Jurczak	Odoszewski	2:54
9.	"Audi" (with Miętha)	Jurczak; Sebastian Morgoś; Oskar Augustyn; Kopera	Kopera	3:44
10.	"Oscar" (with Vito Bambino)	Jurczak; Mateusz Dopieralski; Galiński	Galiński	3:18
Total length:				36:53

Uczta – Physical deluxe edition
No.	Title	Writer(s)	Producer(s)	Length
11.	"Święty Graal" (with ten Stan)	Jurczak; ten Stan	Odoszewski	3:15
Total length:				40:09

Uczta – Digital standard edition
No.	Title	Writer(s)	Producer(s)	Length
1.	"Czesława" (with Natalia Grosiak)	Jurczak; Grosiak	Dąbrowski	4:23
2.	"Szary świat" (with Kwiat Jabłoni)	Jurczak	Buczkowski-Wojtaszek; Kumór	3:24
3.	"Sen we śnie" (with Grzegorz Turnau)	Poe; Jurczak	Kopera	3:26
4.	"Tęsknię sobie" (with Artur Rojek)	Jurczak; Rojek	Dziedzic	4:49
5.	"Ostatnia nadzieja" (with Dawid Podsiadło)	Jurczak; Podsiadło; Galiński	Galiński	3:45
6.	"Mamo tyś płakała" (with Igor Herbut)	Jurczak; Herbut	Odoszewski	3:00
7.	"Eldorado" (with Daria Zawiałow)	Jurczak; Zawiałow; Kopera	Kopera	4:11
8.	"Baczyński (Pisz do mnie listy)" (with Ania Dąbrowska)	Baczyński; Jurczak	Odoszewski	2:54
9.	"Audi" (with Miętha)	Jurczak; Morgoś; Augustyn; Kopera	Kopera	3:44
10.	"Oscar" (with Vito Bambino)	Jurczak; Dopieralski; Galiński	Galiński	3:18
11.	"Święty Graal" (with ten Stan)	Jurczak; ten Stan	Odoszewski	3:15
Total length:				40:09

== Charts ==
=== Weekly charts ===
Chart performance for Uczta
Chart (2022)	Peak position
Polish Albums (ZPAV)	1

=== Year-end charts ===
2022 year-end chart performance for Uczta
Chart (2022)	Position
Polish Albums (ZPAV)	1

2023 year-end chart performance for Uczta
Chart (2023)	Position
Polish Albums (ZPAV)	6

2024 year-end chart performance for Uczta
Chart (2024)	Position
Polish Albums (ZPAV)	26

== Certifications ==
Certifications and sales for Uczta
Region	Certification	Certified units/sales
Poland (ZPAV)	2× Diamond	300,000^{‡}
^{‡} Sales+streaming figures based on certification alone.

== Release history ==
Release formats for Uczta
Region	Date	Format(s)	Edition(s)	Label(s)	Ref.
Various	15 April 2022	CD; digital download; streaming; box set	Standard; deluxe	Magic; Universal	
Various	26 August 2022	LP	Deluxe	Magic; Universal	

== See also ==
- List of number-one albums of 2022 (Poland)
