= Sanah śpiewa poezyje =

Studio album by Sanah
- Released: 25 November 2022
- Genre: Indie pop; sung poetry
- Length: 31:08
- Language: Polish
- Label: Magic; Universal
- Producer: Marek Dziedzic; Arkadiusz Kopera; Thomas Martin Leithead-Docherty (Tom Martin); Jakub Galiński

Sanah chronology
Uczta (2022)	Sanah śpiewa poezyje (2022)	Bankiet u Sanah (2023)

Singles from Uczta
- 1. "Rozwijając Rilkego" Released: 13 October 2022; 2. "Hymn" Released: 13 October 2022; 3. "Do * w sztambuch" Released: 13 October 2022; 4. "Nic dwa razy" Released: 13 October 2022; 5. "(I) Da Bóg kiedyś zasiąść w Polsce wolnej" Released: 13 October 2022; 6. "Warszawa" Released: 13 October 2022; 7. "Bajka" Released: 13 October 2022; 8. "Eldorado" Released: 13 October 2022; 9. "Kamień" Released: 13 October 2022; 10. "(II) Da Bóg kiedyś zasiąść w Polsce wolnej" Released: 13 October 2022

Sanah śpiewa poezyje (English: Sanah sings poems) is the fourth studio album by Polish singer Sanah. It was released by Magic Records and Universal Music Polska on 25 November 2022.

Sanah śpiewa poezyje is a combination of indie pop and sung poetry. The album was produced by Marek Dziedzic, Arkadiusz Kopera, Thomas Martin Leithead-Docherty (Tom Martin) and Jakub Galiński.

It peaked at number one on the Polish albums chart and has been certified diamond by the Polish Society of the Phonographic Industry (ZPAV) on 7 February 2024.

On 13 October 2022, she released ten more singles, each modeled on poems by Polish national bards, including Adam Mickiewicz, Wisława Szymborska and Adam Asnyk.

== Track listing ==
Sanah śpiewa poezyje – standard edition
No.	Title	Writer(s)	Producer(s)	Length
1.	"Rozwijając Rilkego"	Jacek Cygan; Zuzanna Jurczak; Marek Dziedzic	Dziedzic	2:34
2.	"Hymn"	Juliusz Słowacki; Jurczak	Arkadiusz Kopera	4:12
3.	"Do * w sztambuch"	Adam Mickiewicz; Jurczak; Thomas Martin Leithead-Docherty	Martin	3:25
4.	"Nic dwa razy"	Wisława Szymborska; Jurczak	Dziedzic	3:09
5.	"(I) Da Bóg kiedyś zasiąść w Polsce wolnej"	Jan Lechoń; Jurczak	Arkadiusz	3:04
6.	"Warszawa"	Julian Tuwim; Jurczak; Jakub Galiński	Galiński	1:44
7.	"Bajka"	Krzysztof Kamil Baczyński; Jurczak; Kopera	Arkadiusz	4:39
8.	"Eldorado"	Edgar Allan Poe; Jurczak; Kopera	Arkadiusz	2:15
9.	"Kamień"	Asnyk; Jurczak; Leithead-Docherty	Martin	4:07
10.	"(II) Da Bóg kiedyś zasiąść w Polsce wolnej"	Lechoń; Jurczak	Arkadiusz	1:59
Total length:				31:08

== Charts ==
=== Weekly charts ===
Chart performance for Sanah śpiewa poezyje
Chart (2022)	Peak position
Polish Albums (ZPAV)	1

=== Year-end charts ===
2022 year-end chart performance for Sanah śpiewa poezyje
Chart (2022)	Position
Polish Albums (ZPAV)	5

2023 year-end chart performance for Sanah śpiewa poezyje
Chart (2023)	Position
Polish Albums (ZPAV)	4

2024 year-end chart performance for Sanah śpiewa poezyje
Chart (2024)	Position
Polish Albums (ZPAV)	56

== Certifications ==
Certifications and sales for Sanah śpiewa poezyje
Region	Certification	Certified units/sales
Poland (ZPAV)	Diamond	150,000^{‡}
^{‡} Sales+streaming figures based on certification alone.

== Release history ==
Release formats for Sanah śpiewa poezyje
Region	Date	Format(s)	Label(s)	Ref.
Various	25 November 2022	CD; digital download; streaming	Magic; Universal	
Various	13 January 2023	LP	Magic; Universal	

== See also ==
- List of number-one albums of 2022 (Poland)
