= Szampan =

Single by Sanah

from the album Królowa dram
- Released: 3 January 2020
- Genre: Electropop
- Length: 3:20
- Label: Magic
- Songwriters: Sanah; Magdalena Wójcik; Kuba Galiński
- Producer: Galiński

Sanah singles chronology
"Cząstka" (2019)	"Szampan" (2020)	"Melodia" (2020)

"Szampan" (English: Champagne) is a song recorded by Polish singer Sanah. The song was released as the first single from her debut studio album Królowa dram on 3 January 2020 through Magic Records, and was written by Sanah, Magdalena Wójcik, and Kuba Galiński, while production was handled by Galiński.

The single reached number 1 on the Polish Airplay Chart and was certified diamond.

== Music video ==
A music video to accompany the release of "Szampan" was released on 3 January 2020 through Sanah's Vevo channel. It was produced in collaboration with THEDREAMS Studio.

== Track listing ==
Digital download
No.	Title	Length
1.	"Szampan"	3:20

== Charts ==
=== Weekly charts ===
Weekly sales chart performance for "Szampan"
Chart (2020)	Peak position
Poland (Polish Airplay Top 100)	1
Poland (Polish Airplay – New)	2

=== Year-end charts ===
2020 year-end chart performance for "Szampan"
Chart (2020)	Position
Poland (ZPAV)	2

== Certifications ==
Region	Certification	Certified units/sales
Poland (ZPAV)	Diamond	100,000^{‡}
^{‡} Sales+streaming figures based on certification alone.

== Release history ==
Release formats for "Szampan"
Region	Date	Format	Distributor	Ref.
Various	3 January 2020	Digital download	Magic Records	
