= Melodia (Sanah song) =

Single by Sanah

from the album Królowa dram
- Released: 28 February 2020
- Genre: Pop
- Length: 3:04
- Label: Magic
- Songwriters: Sanah; Magdalena Wójcik; Karolina Kozak; Bogdan Kondracki
- Producer: Kondracki

Sanah singles chronology
| "Szampan" (2020) | "Melodia" (2020) | "Królowa dram" (2020) |

"Melodia" (English: Melody) is a song recorded by Polish singer Sanah. The song was released as the second single from her debut studio album Królowa dram on 28 February 2020 through Magic Records, and was written by Sanah, Magdalena Wójcik, Karolina Kozak, and Bogdan Kondracki, while production was handled by Kondracki.

The single reached number 1 on the Polish Airplay Chart, becoming her second chart-topping hit in Poland and was certified diamond.

== Music video ==
A music video to accompany the release of "Melodia" was released on 28 February 2020 through Sanah's Vevo channel. It was produced in collaboration with THEDREAMS Studio.

== Track listing ==
Digital download
| No. | Title | Length |
|---|---|---|
| 1. | "Melodia" | 3:04 |

== Charts ==
=== Weekly charts ===
Weekly sales chart performance for "Melodia"
| Chart (2020) | Peak position |
|---|---|
| CIS (TopHit) | 978 |
| Poland (Polish Airplay Top 100) | 1 |
| Poland (Polish Airplay – New) | 2 |

=== Year-end charts ===
2020 year-end chart performance for "Melodia"
| Chart (2020) | Position |
|---|---|
| Poland (ZPAV) | 11 |

== Certifications ==
| Region | Certification | Certified units/sales |
|---|---|---|
| Poland (ZPAV) | Diamond | 100,000^{‡} |
^{‡} Sales+streaming figures based on certification alone.

== Release history ==
Release formats for "Melodia"
| Region | Date | Format | Distributor | Ref. |
|---|---|---|---|---|
| Various | 28 February 2020 | Digital download | Magic Records | |
