= Kaprysy =

Studio album by Sanah
- Released: 14 June 2024
- Genre: Indie pop
- Length: 42:46
- Language: Polish
- Label: Magic; Universal
- Producer: Jakub Galiński; Thomas Martin Leithead-Docherty (Tom Martin); Patrick the Pan; Marek Dziedzic; Arkadiusz Kopera; ROOM9

Sanah chronology
Bankiet u Sanah (2023)	Kaprysy (2024)	Pianinkowe kaprysy (2024)

Singles from Kaprysy
- 1. "Hip hip hura!" Released: 19 February 2024; 2. "Śrubka" Released: 25 April 2024; 3. "Było, minęło" Released: 13 June 2024; 4. "Miłość jest ślepa" Released: October 2024

Kaprysy is the fifth studio album by Polish singer Sanah. It was released by Magic Records and Universal Music Polska on 14 June 2024.

Kaprysy is a combination of indie pop. The album was produced by Jakub Galiński, Thomas Martin Leithead-Docherty (Tom Martin), Patrick the Pan, Marek Dziedzic, Arkadiusz Kopera and ROOM9.

It peaked at number one on the Polish albums chart and has been certified diamond by the Polish Society of the Phonographic Industry (ZPAV) on 31 December 2024. Three singles preceded the album's release; "Hip hip hura!", the album's lead single, "Śrubka" and "Było, minęło". "Miłość jest ślepa" was announced as the album's fourth single.

== Track listing ==
Kaprysy – Physical standard edition
No.	Title	Writer(s)	Producer(s)	Length
1.	"Hip hip hura!"	Zuzanna Grabowska; Jakub Galiński	Galiński	4:11
2.	"Kaprys gis-moll"	Grabowska, Thomas Martin Leithead-Docherty, Edward Leithead-Docherty	Martin	0:27
3.	"Miłość jest ślepa"	Grabowska; Martin; E. Leithead-Docherty	Martin	3:17
4.	"Śrubka"	Grabowska; Piotr Madej	Patrick the Pan	4:10
5.	"Fafarafa"	Grabowska; Martin; E. Leithead-Docherty; Krzysztof Baranowski	Martin	3:10
6.	"Mleczna droga"	Grabowska; Martin; E. Leithead-Docherty	Martin	4:08
7.	"Pańskie łzy to woda"	Grabowska; Martin; E. Leithead-Docherty	Martin	3:21
8.	"O miłości"	Grabowska; Eliza Gryza-Ostatnik; Galiński	Galiński	2:57
9.	"Do kiedy jestem"	Grabowska; Marek Dziedzic	Dziedzic	3:20
10.	"Talenty i mankamenty"	Grabowska; Martin; E. Leithead-Docherty	Martin	3:37
11.	"Wiśta wio!"	Grabowska; Martin; E. Leithead-Docherty; Amy Macdonald	Martin	3:31
12.	"Było, minęło"	Grabowska; Martin; E. Leithead-Docherty	Martin	3:27
13.	"Aha (kwiecień 2020)"	Grabowska; Arkadiusz Kopera	Kopera	3:10
Total length:				42:46

Kaprysy – Physical deluxe edition
No.	Title	Writer(s)	Producer(s)	Length
1.	"Intrada"	Grabowska; Martin; E. Leithead-Docherty	Martin	1:15
2.	"Sad"	Grabowska; Kopera	Kopera	2:57
3.	"Talenty i mankamenty"	Grabowska; Martin; E. Leithead-Docherty	Martin	3:37
4.	"Hip hip hura!"	Grabowska; Galiński	Galiński	4:11
5.	"Nimbostratus"	Grabowska; Galiński	Galiński	3:15
6.	"Kaprys gis-moll"	Grabowska; Martin; E. Leithead-Docherty	Martin	0:27
7.	"Miłość jest ślepa"	Grabowska; Martin; E. Leithead-Docherty	Martin	3:17
8.	"Śrubka"	Grabowska; Madej	the Pan	4:10
9.	"Wiśta wio!"	Grabowska; Martin; E. Leithead-Docherty; Macdonald	Martin	3:31
10.	"Arco"	Grabowska; Martin; E. Leithead-Docherty	Martin	1:21
11.	"Mleczna droga"	Grabowska; Martin; E. Leithead-Docherty	Martin	4:08
12.	"Było, minęło"	Grabowska; Martin; E. Leithead-Docherty	Martin	3:27
13.	"Fafarafa"	Grabowska; Martin; E. Leithead-Docherty; Baranowski	Martin	3:10
14.	"Pańskie łzy to woda"	Grabowska; Martin; E. Leithead-Docherty	Martin	3:21
15.	"Spietruszam"	Grabowska; Martin; E. Leithead-Docherty	Martin	2:35
16.	"O miłości"	Grabowska; Gryza-Ostatnik; Galiński	Galiński	2:57
17.	"Do kiedy jestem"	Grabowska; Dziedzic	Dziedzic	3:20
18.	"Słodkiego miłego życzę"	Grabowska; Kopera	Kopera	3:20
19.	"Miałam taki kaprys!!!"	Grabowska, Lorenzo Santarelli; Marco Salvaderi; Kende	ROOM9	3:09
20.	"Coda"	Grabowska; Martin; E. Leithead-Docherty	Martin	0:06
Total length:				57:34

Kaprysy – Digital standard edition
No.	Title	Writer(s)	Producer(s)	Length
1.	"Intrada"	Grabowska; Martin; E. Leithead-Docherty	Martin	1:15
2.	"Sad"	Grabowska; Kopera	Kopera	2:57
3.	"Talenty i mankamenty"	Grabowska; Martin; E. Leithead-Docherty	Martin	3:37
4.	"Hip hip hura!"	Grabowska; Galiński	Galiński	4:11
5.	"Nimbostratus"	Grabowska; Galiński	Galiński	3:15
6.	"Kaprys gis-moll"	Grabowska; Martin; E. Leithead-Docherty	Martin	0:27
7.	"Miłość jest ślepa"	Grabowska; Martin; E. Leithead-Docherty	Martin	3:17
8.	"Śrubka"	Grabowska; Madej	the Pan	4:10
9.	"Wiśta wio!"	Grabowska; Martin; E. Leithead-Docherty; Macdonald	Martin	3:31
10.	"Arco"	Grabowska; Martin; E. Leithead-Docherty	Martin	1:21
11.	"Mleczna droga"	Grabowska; Martin; E. Leithead-Docherty	Martin	4:08
12.	"Było, minęło"	Grabowska; Martin; E. Leithead-Docherty	Martin	3:27
13.	"Fafarafa"	Grabowska; Martin; E. Leithead-Docherty; Baranowski	Martin	3:10
14.	"Pańskie łzy to woda"	Grabowska; Martin; E. Leithead-Docherty	Martin	3:21
15.	"Spietruszam"	Grabowska; Martin; E. Leithead-Docherty	Martin	2:35
16.	"O miłości"	Grabowska; Gryza-Ostatnik; Galiński	Galiński	2:57
17.	"Do kiedy jestem"	Grabowska; Dziedzic	Dziedzic	3:20
18.	"Słodkiego miłego życzę"	Grabowska; Kopera	Kopera	3:20
19.	"Miałam taki kaprys!!!"	Grabowska; Santarelli; Salvaderi; Kende	ROOM9	3:09
20.	"Coda"	Grabowska; Martin; E. Leithead-Docherty	Martin	0:06
21.	"Aha (kwiecień 2020)"	Grabowska; Kopera	Kopera	3:10
Total length:				60:44

Pianinkowe kaprysy – Physical standard edition
No.	Title	Writer(s)	Producer(s)	Length
1.	"Miłość jest ślepa"	Grabowska; Martin; E. Leithead-Docherty	Martin	3:15
2.	"Talenty i mankamenty"	Grabowska; Martin; E. Leithead-Docherty	Martin	3:27
3.	"Było, minęło"	Grabowska; Martin; E. Leithead-Docherty	Martin	3:37
4.	"Mleczna droga"	Grabowska; Martin; E. Leithead-Docherty	Martin	4:09
5.	"Nimbostratus"	Grabowska; Galiński	Martin	2:54
6.	"Wiśta wio!"	Grabowska; Martin; E. Leithead-Docherty; Macdonald	Martin	4:45
7.	"Śrubka"	Grabowska; Madej	Martin	4:13
8.	"Pańskie łzy to woda"	Grabowska; Martin; E. Leithead-Docherty	Martin	3:36
9.	"Do kiedy jestem"	Grabowska; Dziedzic	Martin	3:17
10.	"Miałam taki kaprys!!!"	Grabowska; Santarelli; Salvaderi; Kende	Martin	2:59
11.	"Hip hip hura!"	Grabowska; Galiński	Martin	4:08
12.	"Spietruszam"	Grabowska; Martin; E. Leithead-Docherty	Martin	2:33
13.	"Słodkiego miłego życzę"	Grabowska; Kopera	Martin	2:52
14.	"Aha (kwiecień 2020)"	Grabowska; Kopera	Martin	3:24
Total length:				49:09

== Charts ==
=== Weekly charts ===
Chart performance for Kaprysy
Chart (2024)	Peak position
Polish Albums (ZPAV)	1

Chart performance for Pianinkowe kaprysy
Chart (2024)	Peak position
Polish Albums (ZPAV)	1

=== Year-end charts ===
2024 year-end chart performance for Kaprysy
Chart (2024)	Position
Polish Albums (ZPAV)	1

== Certifications ==
Certifications and sales for Kaprysy
Region	Certification	Certified units/sales
Poland (ZPAV)	Diamond	150,000^{‡}
^{‡} Sales+streaming figures based on certification alone.

Certifications and sales for Pianinkowe kaprysy
Region	Certification	Certified units/sales
Poland (ZPAV)	Gold	15,000^{‡}
^{‡} Sales+streaming figures based on certification alone.

== Release history ==
Release formats for Kaprysy
Region	Date	Format(s)	Edition(s)	Label(s)	Ref.
Various	14 June 2024	CD; LP; digital download; streaming	Standard; deluxe	Magic; Universal	
Various	30 August 2024	CD; digital download; streaming	Pianinkowe kaprysy	Magic; Universal	
Various	27 September 2024	LP	Pianinkowe kaprysy	Magic; Universal	
