= Królowa dram =

Studio album by Sanah
- Released: 8 May 2020
- Recorded: 2019–2020
- Genre: Electropop; indie pop
- Length: 33:43
- Language: Polish
- Label: Magic
- Producer: Paweł Odoszewski; Thomas Martin Leithead-Docherty (Tom Martin); Dominic Buczkowski-Wojtaszek; Kuba Galiński; Bogdan Kondracki; Marcel Závodi; Christian Eberhard; Andrei Idu; Czarny HIFI; Michał Pietrzak; KNOXA; The Maneken

Sanah chronology
Ja na imię niewidzialna mam (2019)	Królowa dram (2020)	Bujda (2020)

Singles from Królowa dram
- 1. "Szampan" Released: 3 January 2020; 2. "Melodia" Released: 28 February 2020; 3. "Królowa dram" Released: 1 May 2020

Królowa dram (English: Drama queen) is the debut studio album by Polish singer Sanah. The album was released on 8 May 2020 through Magic Records. It peaked at number one on the Polish albums chart and has been certified diamond. In addition to new tracks, the album also includes six songs previously included on her debut extended play Ja na imię niewidzialna mam (2019). The album was produced by Paweł Odoszewski, Thomas Martin Leithead-Docherty (Tom Martin), Dominic Buczkowski-Wojtaszek, Kuba Galiński, Bogdan Kondracki, Marcel Závodi, Christian Eberhard, Andrei Idu, Czarny HIFI, Michał Pietrzak, KNOXA and The Maneken.

The album was preceded by three singles: the lead single "Szampan" topped the Polish singles chart for four nonconsecutive weeks, becoming Sanah's first number-one single on the chart, while the second single "Melodia" also peaked at number one. The title track was released as the third single from the album.

== Singles ==
"Szampan" was released as the album's lead single on 3 January 2020. The song became a commercial success in Poland, becoming Sanah's first number-one hit in the country, in addition to being certified diamond, while its music video has also amassed more than 70 million views on YouTube.

"Melodia" was released as the album's second single on 28 February 2020. The song also peaked at number-one in Poland, becoming Sanah's second chart-topping hit in the country. "Królowa dram" was released as the album's third single on 1 May 2020.

== Track listing ==
Królowa dram – Physical standard edition
No.	Title	Writer(s)	Producer(s)	Length
1.	"Początek"	Sanah; Paweł Odoszewski	Odoszewski	0:55
2.	"Królowa dram"	Sanah; Magdalena Wójcik; Thomas Martin Leithead-Docherty	Leithead-Docherty	3:05
3.	"To ja a nie inna"	Sanah; Dominic Buczkowski-Wojtaszek	Buczkowski-Wojtaszek	3:11
4.	"Siebie zapytasz"	Sanah; Kuba Galiński	Galiński	3:48
5.	"Melodia"	Sanah; Wójcik; Karolina Kozak; Bogdan Kondracki	Kondracki	3:03
6.	"Szampan"	Sanah; Wójcik; Galiński	Galiński	3:20
7.	"Łezki me"	Sanah; Leithead-Docherty	Leithead-Docherty	3:09
8.	"Proszę"	Sanah; Odoszewski	Odoszewski	0:27
9.	"Proszę pana"	Sanah; Wójcik; Johnny K. Palmer; Marcel Závodi	Závodi	2:54
10.	"Oto cała ja"	Sanah; Leithead-Docherty	Leithead-Docherty	2:58
11.	"2/10"	Sanah; Wójcik; Cristian Eberhard; Andrei Idu; Catalin Fantaneanu	Eberhard; Idu	2:56
12.	"Sama"	Sanah; Wójcik; Eberhard; Idu	Eberhard; Idu	3:11
13.	"Koniec"	Sanah; Odoszewski	Odoszewski	0:46
Total length:				33:43

Królowa dram – Digital standard edition
No.	Title	Writer(s)	Producer(s)	Length
1.	"Początek"	Sanah; Paweł Odoszewski	Odoszewski	0:55
2.	"Królowa dram"	Sanah; Wójcik; Thomas Martin Leithead-Docherty	Leithead-Docherty	3:05
3.	"To ja a nie inna"	Sanah; Dominic Buczkowski-Wojtaszek	Buczkowski-Wojtaszek	3:11
4.	"Siebie zapytasz"	Sanah; Kuba Galiński	Galiński	3:48
5.	"Melodia"	Sanah; Wójcik; Karolina Kozak; Bogdan Kondracki	Kondracki	3:03
6.	"Szampan"	Sanah; Wójcik; Galiński	Galiński	3:20
7.	"Łezki me"	Sanah; Leithead-Docherty	Leithead-Docherty	3:09
8.	"Proszę"	Sanah; Odoszewski	Odoszewski	0:27
9.	"Proszę pana"	Sanah; Wójcik; Johnny K. Palmer; Marcel Závodi	Závodi	2:54
10.	"Oto cała ja"	Sanah; Leithead-Docherty	Leithead-Docherty	2:58
11.	"2/10"	Sanah; Wójcik; Cristian Eberhard; Andrei Idu; Catalin Fantaneanu	Eberhard; Idu	2:56
12.	"Sama"	Sanah; Wójcik; Eberhard; Idu	Eberhard; Idu	3:11
13.	"Piękno tej niechcianej"	Sanah; Czarny HIFI	Czarny HIFI	2:05
14.	"Cząstka"	Sanah; Wójcik; Galiński	Galiński	4:10
15.	"Koronki"	Sanah; Wójcik; Tom Hollings; Sam Brennan	Michał Pietrzak; KNOXA	3:51
16.	"Idź"	Sanah; Wójcik; Yevgen Filatov	The Maneken	3:45
17.	"Solo"	Sanah; Wójcik; Czarny HIFI	Czarny HIFI	2:34
18.	"Aniołom szepnij to"	Sanah; Czarny HIFI	Czarny HIFI	3:42
19.	"Koniec"	Sanah; Odoszewski	Odoszewski	0:46
Total length:				53:50

== Charts ==
=== Weekly charts ===
Weekly sales chart performance for Królowa dram
Chart (2020)	Peak position
Polish Albums (ZPAV)	1

=== Year-end charts ===
2020 year-end chart performance for Królowa dram
Chart (2020)	Position
Polish Albums (ZPAV)	5

2021 year-end chart performance for Królowa dram
Chart (2021)	Position
Polish Albums (ZPAV)	3

2022 year-end chart performance for Królowa dram
Chart (2022)	Position
Polish Albums (ZPAV)	8

2023 year-end chart performance for Królowa dram
Chart (2023)	Position
Polish Albums (ZPAV)	45

2024 year-end chart performance for Królowa dram
Chart (2024)	Position
Polish Albums (ZPAV)	81

== Certifications ==
Certifications and sales for Królowa dram
Region	Certification	Certified units/sales
Poland (ZPAV)	Diamond	150,000^{‡}
^{‡} Sales+streaming figures based on certification alone.

== Release history ==
Release formats for Królowa dram
Region	Date	Format	Distributor	Ref.
Various	8 May 2020	CD; digital download; streaming	Magic Records	

== See also ==
- List of number-one albums of 2020 (Poland)
