= Kwiat Jabłoni =

Polish music band from Warsaw

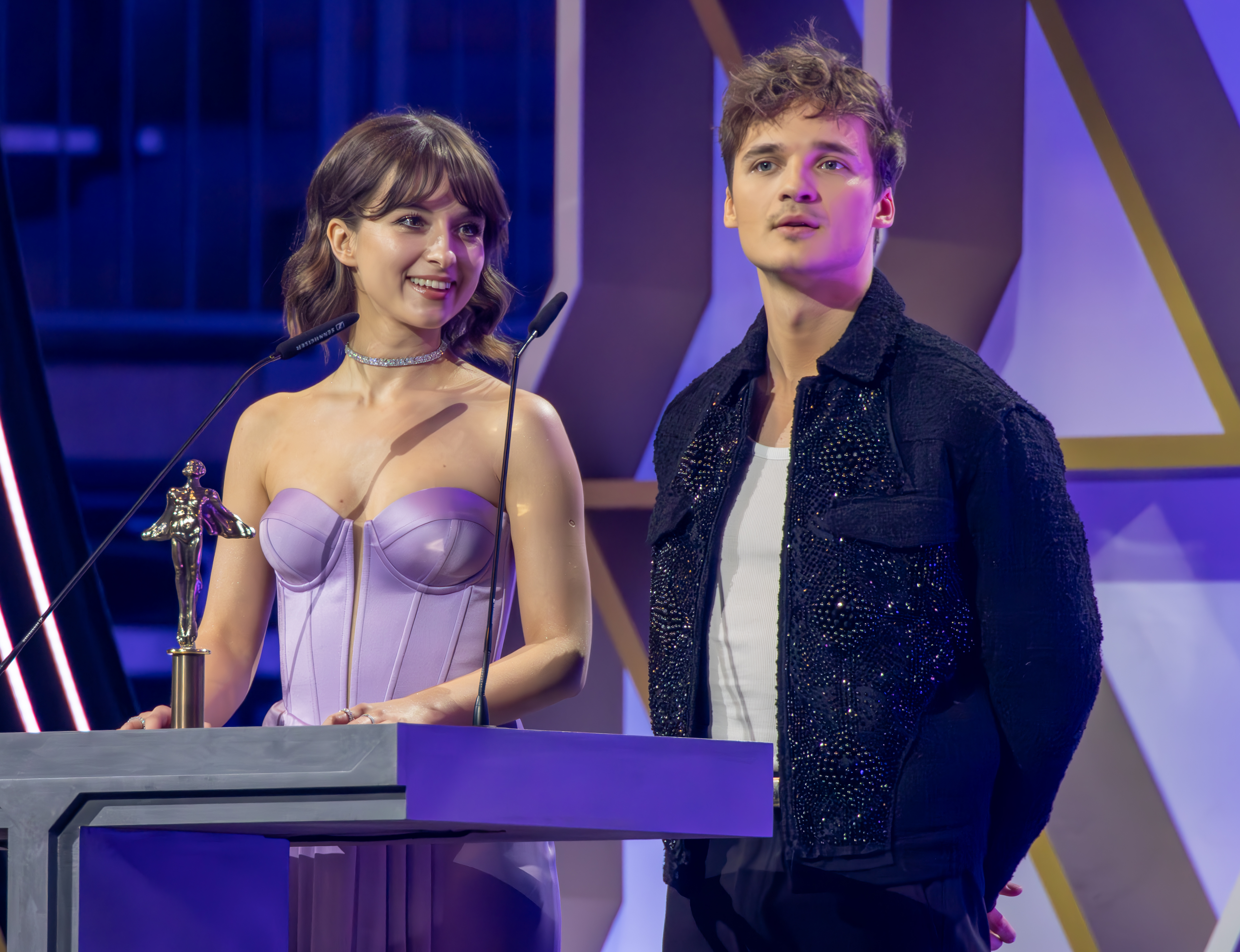
- Kwiat Jabłoni during the Fryderyk Festiwal music awards ceremony, 2024

Background information
- Origin: Warsaw, Poland
- Genres: folk, pop, folk pop, bluegrass, indie folk, indie pop, electronic music
- Years active: 2018–present
- Label: Agora
- Members: Katarzyna Sienkiewicz; Jacek Sienkiewicz; Grzegorz Kowalski; Marcin Ścierański
- Website: http://kwiatjabloni.pl/

Kwiat Jabłoni is a Polish music band from Warsaw performing folk, pop, folk pop, bluegrass, indie folk, indie pop, and electronic music.

== Band name ==
The band's name comes from the song "Kwiat Jabłoni" (meaning "the flower of an apple tree") originally by the group Trash Buddha, while the song itself is about jabol.

== History ==
The band is made up of siblings Katarzyna Sienkiewicz and Jacek Sienkiewicz (Polish rock music performer Kuba Sienkiewicz's children), and the group itself has been official since March 2018. Previously, the siblings performed in the group Hollow Quartet, with which they released the well-received album Chodź ze mną and appeared on the TV talent show Must Be the Music. By August 2018, their debut song "Dziś późno pójdę spać" had recorded two million views on YouTube, by 2026 the music video had been played over 56 million times. The band's second single "Niemożliwe" was released in October 2018.

On 1 February 2019, they released their debut studio album Niemożliwe, which reached number 7 on the OLiS sales charts within the first week. Their songs were also included in the charts Lista Przebojów Programu Trzeciego and Radio Warszawa, among others.

In March 2019, the band was ranked 3rd in the second edition of the Sanki 2019 poll for the most interesting new faces of the Polish music scene organized by Gazeta Wyborcza, and in July they performed on a small stage at Pol'and'Rock Festival, where their concert was listened to by several thousand people. The performance at the festival resulted in the 29 November 2019 release of the album Live Pol'and'Rock Festival 2019 with the recording of their concert.

In June 2020, Kwiat Jabłoni became the winner of the Złoty Bączek plebiscite, which guaranteed their participation in the online edition of Pol'and'Rock Festival at the turn of July and August 2020. In November, they released the single "Mogło być nic", which during one week gained over a million views on YouTube. It promoted their second studio album of the same name, released on 5 February 2021.

In August 2021, the band participated in the promotional campaign "Wszystko mi mówi" by Tymbark. As part of this project along with Sanah, Vito Bambino and Artur Rojek recorded a music video in which they sang their version of the song "Wszystko mi mówi, że mnie ktoś pokochał" by Skaldowie.

In March 2022, they released a joint single with Sanah titled "Szary świat". In 2022, together with Bedoes and Krzysztof Zalewski, they formed the supergroup Męskie Granie Orkiestra 2022, as part of which they recorded the single "Jest tylko teraz". In the same year, they recorded (with guest appearances by other artists) the album Wolne serca for the Warsaw Rising Museum.

In 2025, the band expressed solidarity with the Palestinians and encouraged fans to actively support them and follow sources of information regarding the situation in the Gaza Strip.

== Members ==
- Grzegorz Kowalski - bass, synthesizer
- Jacek Sienkiewicz - vocal, mandolin, banjolin, electronics
- Katarzyna Sienkiewicz - vocals, keyboard instruments (piano or electronic piano)
- Marcin Ścierański - drums

== Discography ==
=== Studio albums ===
- Niemożliwe (2019); POL: 2×Platinum
- Mogło być nic (2021); POL: Platinum
- Wolne serca (2022)
- Pokaz slajdów (2023)

=== Live albums ===
- Live Pol’and’Rock Festival 2019 (2019)
