= Sobel (singer) =

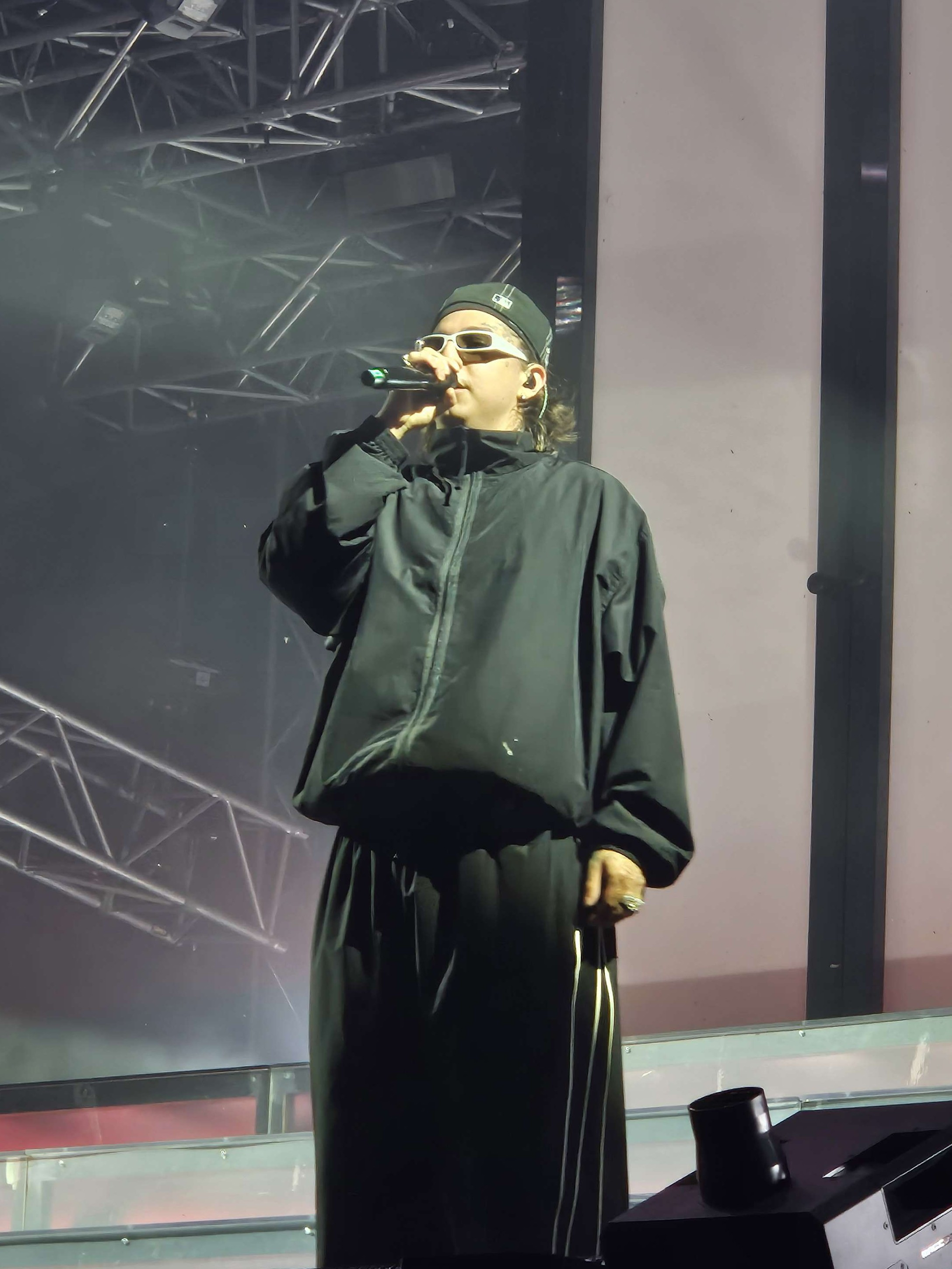
- Sobel in June 2025

Background information
- Born: Szymon Sobel; November 22, 2001 (age 24); Świdnica, Poland
- Genres: Pop, hip hop
- Occupations: Singer, songwriter, rapper, record producer
- Years active: 2019–present
- Labels: Universal Music Polska, Def Jam Recordings

Szymon Sobel (born November 22, 2001), known professionally as Sobel, is a Polish pop and hip-hop singer, songwriter and record producer. He was born in Świdnica, Poland.

He gained popularity after the release of the single "Impreza", which was certified for a diamond record. He repeated his success in 2020 with the single "Daj mi znać" recorded with Michał Szczygieł and the solo track "Fiołkowe pole" released in 2021. He was nominated for the Fryderyk 2021 Music Award in the Phonographic Debut of the Year category. The rapper has released one album Pułapka na motyle in 2021 and a mini-album Kontrast in 2020. As of 2024, he has gained over 2,000,000 monthly listeners on Spotify.

== Discography ==
- Kontrast (2020)
- Pułapka na motyle (2021)
- W związku z muzyką (2024)
- Napisz jak będziesz (2025)
