= Magdalena Wójcik =

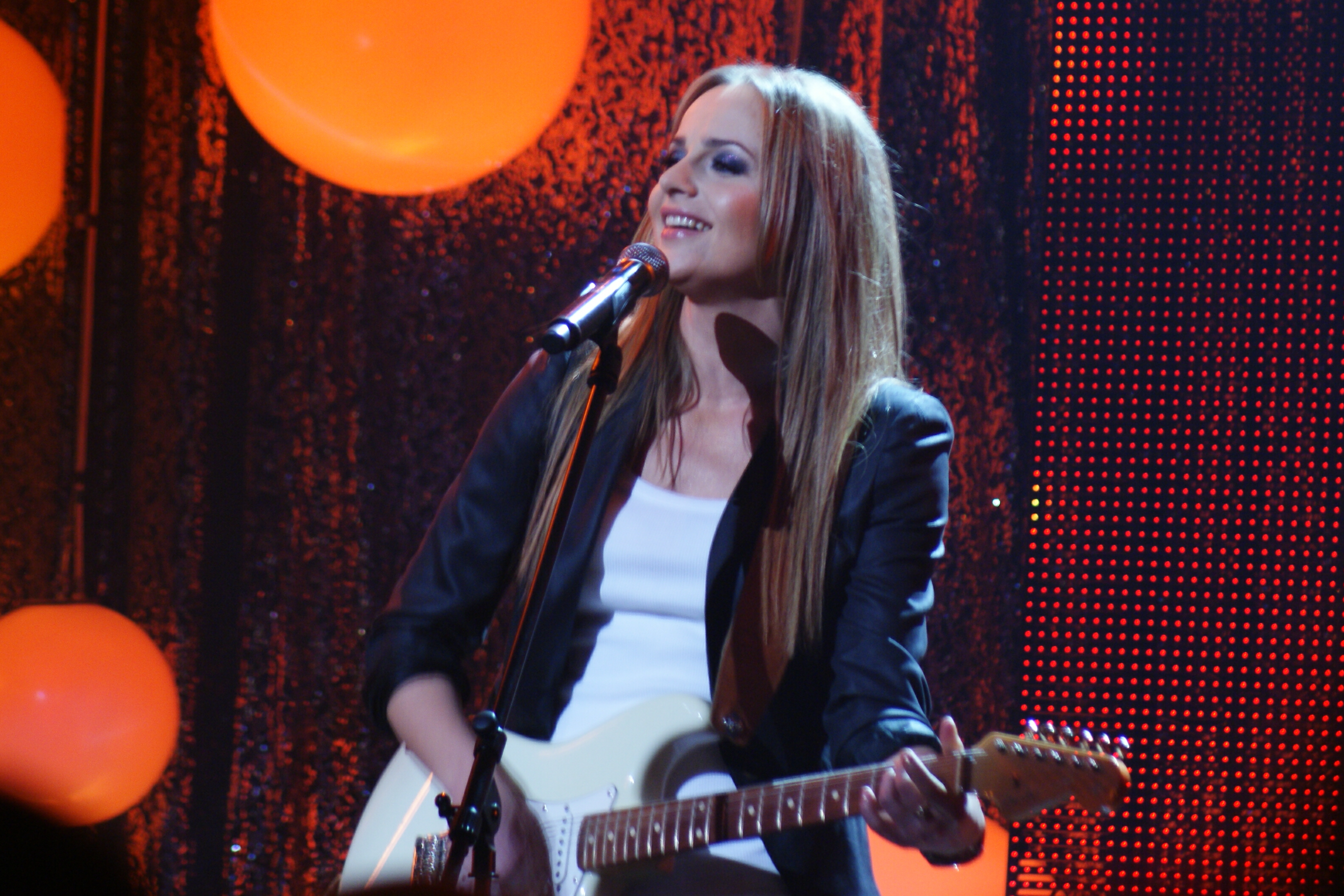
- Magdalena Wójcik

Background information
- Born: Magdalena Wójcik; 2 September 1975 (age 50)
- Origin: Krasnystaw, Poland
- Genres: Pop, rock
- Occupations: Singer-songwriter, musician
- Instruments: Guitar, harmonica, keyboard
- Years active: 1993–present
- Labels: Dalmafon, EMI Music Poland
- Member of: Goya

Magdalena Wójcik (born 2 September 1975 in Krasnystaw, Poland) is a Polish singer and lead member of the Polish band Goya.

Wójcik participated in numerous amateur activities in music, singing and playing guitar from a high school age. In 1993, she released her own album which was published on cassette by the publisher Dalmafon.

In the mid-1990s she signed a multi-year contract with the record company EMI Pomaton. In 1995, along with guitarist Grzegorz Jędrach and keyboardist Rafał Gorączowski, she co-founded the Polish band Goya. In 1998 the band released their first album, titled Goya.

== Discography ==
Solo albums

- Utkane z wyobrażeń (2010)
