= Sanah (singer) =

Polish musical artist (born 1997)

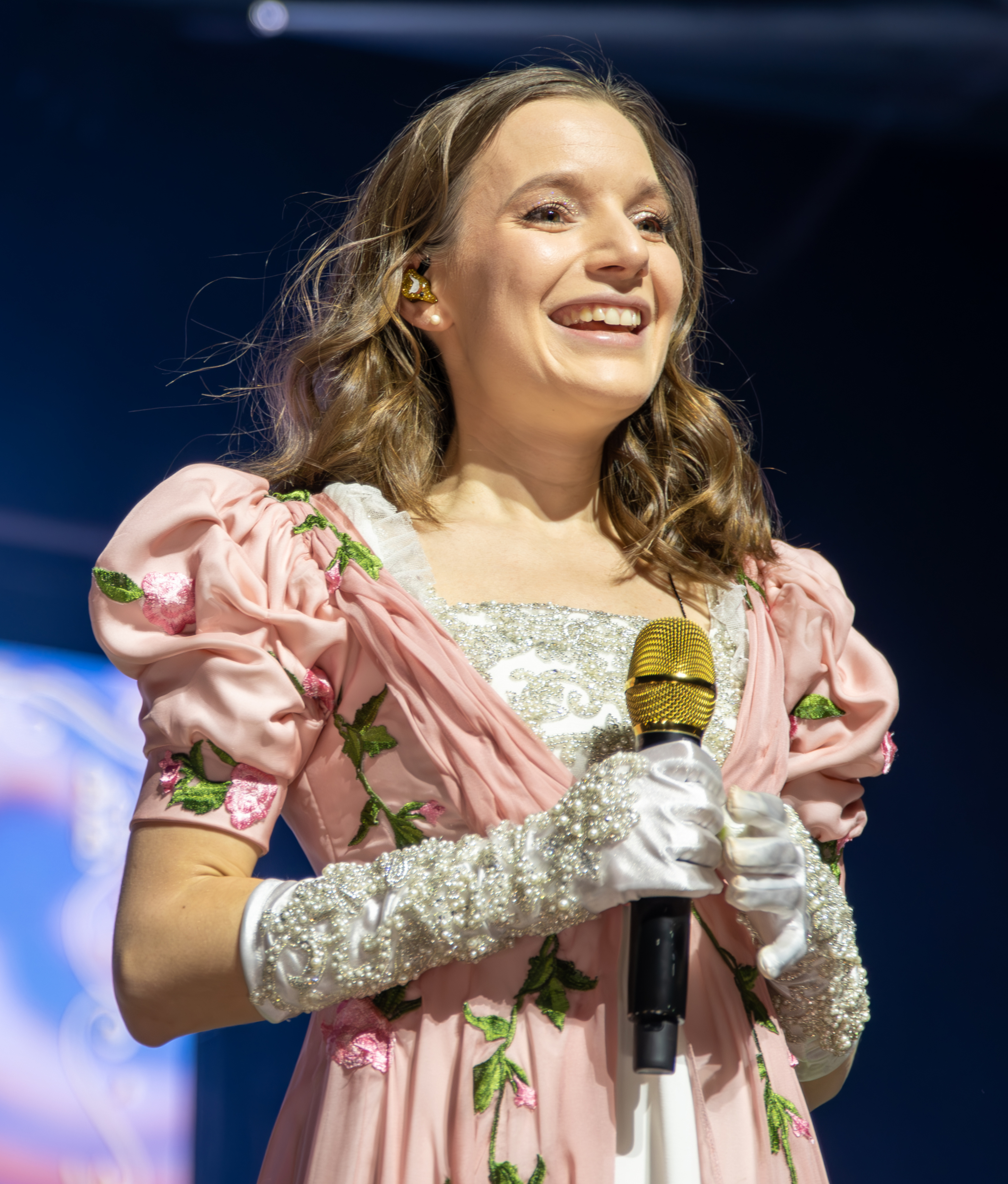
- Sanah in 2024
- Born: Zuzanna Irena Jurczak; 2 September 1997 (age 28); Warsaw, Poland
- Other name: Ayreen
- Education: Chopin University of Music
- Occupations: Singer; songwriter
- Years active: 2014–present
- Spouse: Stanisław Grabowski (m. 2022)
- Musical career
- Genres: Indie pop; art pop; electropop; Sung poetry
- Instruments: Vocals; violin; piano
- Label: Magic
- Website: sanah.pl

Zuzanna Irena Grabowska (née Jurczak; born 2 September 1997), known professionally as sanah (stylized in all lowercase), is a Polish singer, songwriter, violinist, and composer. She received nationwide popularity in 2020, with the release of her single "Szampan", which became a number one hit in Poland. She later released her debut studio album Królowa dram (2020), which peaked at number one in Poland. She has gone on to release three further studio albums: Irenka (2021), Uczta (2022), and Sanah śpiewa poezyje (2022), all of which peaked at number one in Poland, and were certified diamond by the Polish Society of the Phonographic Industry. She released her fifth studio album Kaprysy on 14 June 2024.

The stage name "sanah" was created by shortening the English version of the singer's first name, Susannah. She previously performed under the pseudonym "Ayreen", which was derived from her middle name, Irena, the Polish equivalent of Irene.

== Early life and education ==
Jurczak was born in Warsaw, and has six siblings. Her mother is a veterinarian, having studied veterinary medicine at the Warsaw University of Life Sciences. Jurczak has lived in Stare Babice in Warsaw West County since her childhood.

She started attending music school at the age of six; she started playing the violin at the age of four and started learning piano at five. From 2004 to 2013, she attended the Grażyna Bacewicz State Music School Complex in Warsaw. During this period, she auditioned for a chamber quartet at the ZPOSM. For the next three years, she studied at the Zenon Brzewski General Secondary Music School. In June 2019, she defended her bachelor's thesis in violin class at the Fryderyk Chopin University of Music in Warsaw. In June 2021, she obtained her master's degree in instrumental music from the same university.

== Career ==
=== 2014–2017: Beginnings ===
Jurczak took part in auditions for The Voice of Poland several times. She also performed in the Polish and British versions of Got Talent: Mam talent! and Britain's Got Talent, but did not achieve success in them. She gained popularity by posting her original songs on YouTube and Periscope. She started posting them in 2014 as Zuzia Jurczak. Jurczak's first known original songs are; "It Is Right"; performed in 2017 as "Alone", "Heartbreak", "I'm Stolen" and "Za mała". After she began working with Magic Records, she removed all previous songs from the service. She signed a recording contract with Magic Records with the help of Andrzej Puczynski. Her first public appearance was on Tedx Talks.

In 2015, she got to the final of the 10th Festiwal Piosenki Dziecięcej i Młodzieżowej "Ten Ton" with the song "Poranne łzy". Her performance was included in the album entitled Ten Ton – Piosenki Wojciecha Młynarskiego. Jurczak also performed at the Anna German Song Festival in Ciechocinek the same year with the song "Jest taka droga". She also participated in the Blue Note Poznań Competition, but did not win.

On 28 February 2016, she played the violin at the Zenon Brzewski Graduation Concert. She also qualified for the semi-finals of the International Songwriting Competition with the song "Rehab" in two categories; Pop/Top 40 and Unpublished. As a single, the song was released on 28 April 2017 by Serio Records. Jurczak took the pseudonym Ayreen at the time. It was her only music release under this alias. She then put her career on hold for one year.

=== 2019–2020: EPs and Królowa dram ===
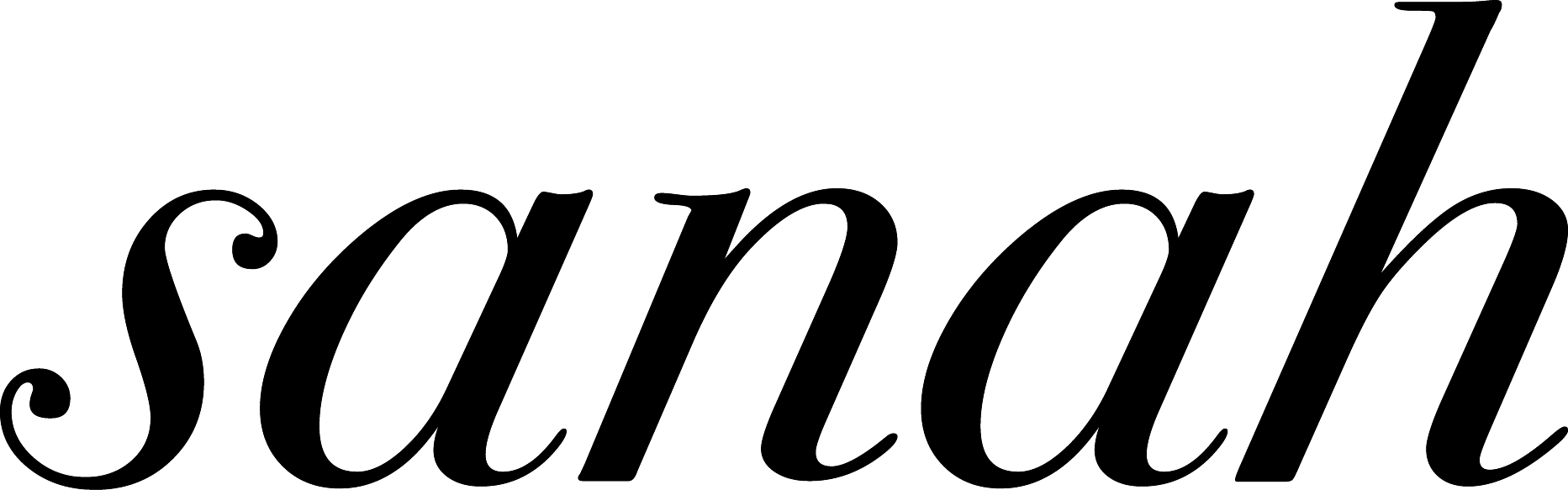
Sanah's logo (since 2019; since releasing minialbum ja na imię niewidzialna mam)

In March 2019, under the stage name Sanah, she featured in the song "Rich in Love" by Matt Dusk, which reached number one on the Spotify Viral Top50 list, with Dawid Podsiadło performing a cover of the song at one of his concerts. In September 2019, she released the single "Idź", which reached number one on New Music Poland's Vevo DSCVR playlist. On 11 October, she released an EP named ja na imię niewidzialna mam, which went to number three on the OLiS sales chart.

In January 2020, she released the single "Szampan", with which she announced her debut studio album. The same month, she was nominated in three categories for the "Fryderyk" music award. In May, she released an album entitled Królowa dram, which reached the top of the OLiS sales list in the first week of its release. On 10 May, she released a video as part of the #Hot16Challenge campaign, for which she was nominated by rapper Zeus. On 6 September 2020, she performed at the National Festival of Polish Songs in Opole with her single "No sory", which heralded the singer's second EP entitled Bujda, which was released on 23 October 2020, as well as the #NoSory Tour. In October, she released a music video for the single "Pożal się Boże", which she used to promote the EP. In the same month, she also released the single "Bujda", the song "Duszki", and released the music video for the song "Oczy". In December, it was announced that she was the most-played artist in Poland in 2020 on Spotify. Jurczak also made a guest appearance in the final of the 11th edition of The Voice of Poland, performing the songs "Szampan" and "No Sory". On 11 December, Sanah released the promotional single "Invisible Dress (Maro Music x Skytech Remix)". The song, apart from reaching number 6 on the AirPlay Top chart, was also on many Polish radio charts. It was also the first single of the artist which achieved international success, where it got on the iTunes chart list in Italy, where it was played on more than 10 radio stations. On 31 December 2020, her song "Szampan" won the annual New Year's Eve Hot 100 charts broadcast on Radio Eska.

=== 2021: Irenka ===
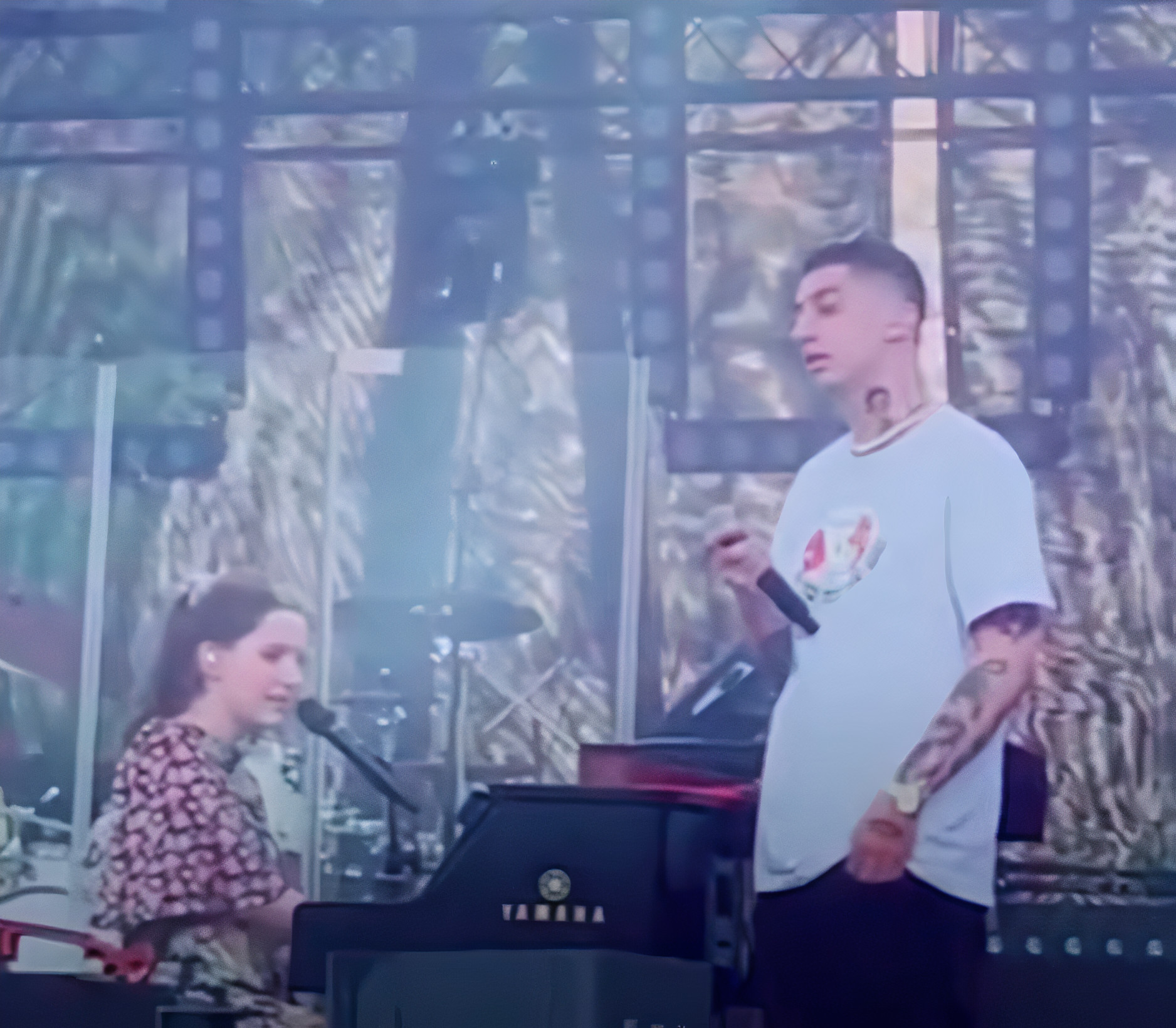
Sanah and Sobel

On 14 January 2021, she released the single "Ale jazz!" with Vito Bambino. The song was accompanied by a music video recorded at the Buffo Theatre in Warsaw, which was released on the same day. On 31 January, she performed at the final of the 29th Great Orchestra of Christmas Charity in Rawa Mazowiecka. She was also nominated for the Nickelodeon Kids' Choice Awards in the "Favorite Polish Star" category. On 9 February, she performed with Igor Walaszek at the 2020 Empik Bestsellers Gala, where she won in the "Pop/Rock Music" category for her album Królowa dram. She was also nominated in the "Streaming" category with the songs "Szampan" and "Melodia", but didn't win. Jurczak then released the single "2:00". On 23 April, she released "Heal Me", which is an English-language version of the song "Ale jazz!". The single included the original version of "Heal Me" and a remix performed by German DJ duo Lizot. The song was accompanied by two music videos directed by Michał Pańszczyk; the original and the remix by Lizot. Irenka was also promoted by the singles "Etc. (at disco)", "Etc." and "Ten stan". On 7 May 2021, the artist released her second studio album titled Irenka. The album got to the top of the OLiS list. It also turned out to be the most purchased release in the first half of 2021 in all provinces according to the Empik store chain. Music videos were made for all the songs, except for "Warcaby". Only a day after the release of the album, it was listed in the 200 most popular songs on Spotify; as many as 25 were occupied by Sanah's songs. Similar things happened in the Apple Music list, where 23 out of 100 songs listed featured Sanah. On 12 June, Sanah's third EP named Invisible EP was released solely in vinyl format. On 26 June, she performed at Polsat SuperHit Festival 2021, with the songs "Szampan" and "No sory", where she was also awarded the title of "Best Debut of the Year". On 5 August 2021, she performed at the Fryderyki 2021 Awards Gala with the song "2:00". There she was nominated for 5 categories, of which she won in one; Pop Album of the Year.

In August 2021, she took part in the promotional campaign "Wszystko mi mówi" by Tymbark. As part of this project, together with Vito Bambino, Kwiat Jabłoni and Artur Rojek, recorded a music video in which they sing their own versions of the song "Wszystko mi mówi, że mnie ktoś pokochał" by Skaldowie. In the same month, her song "Ten stan" started to be played on radio stations, which became a number 1 single in Poland. On 13 October, Sanah released the single "Cześć, jak się masz?", created in collaboration with rapper Sobel, as part of the Mastercard Music campaign. A music video was created for the song, which reached one million views in the first day. On 31 October, Sanah embarked on her second tour: Kolońska i szlugi Tour, which promoted the album Irenka. As part of the tour, she visited seven cities. At that time, she also released two singles; "Kolońska i szlugi" and another version of the same song, "Kolońska i szlugi (do snu)". They were accompanied by a joint music video, directed by the artist and Michal Panszczyk.

In 2022, Sanah was nominated in two categories for Empik Bestsellers; she won in the category "Pop/rock music" with the album Irenka. She performed the song "Kolońska i szlugi" at the gala for this event.

=== 2022–present: Uczta and Sanah śpiewa poezyje ===
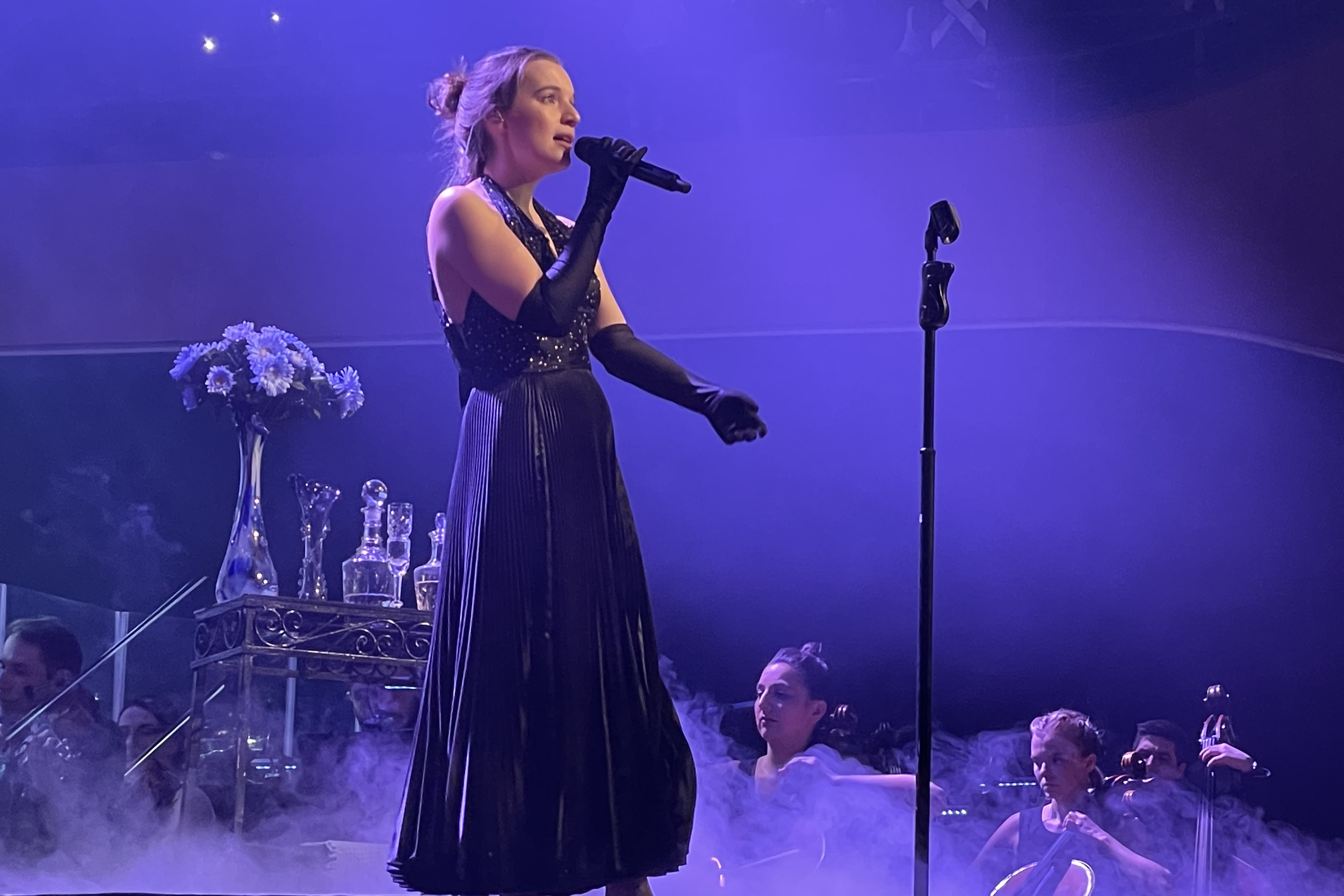
Sanah in 2023

On 7 March 2022, the single "Mamo tyś płakała" was released, which Sanah recorded together with Igor Herbut. The song was recorded for charity, where one hundred percent of the proceeds were donated to the Siemacha Association to help children who were victims of the Russian invasion of Ukraine. The next single promoting the album Uczta was "Szary świat", recorded together with the band Kwiat Jabłoni and published on 17 March. The next singles were "Czesława" with Natalia Grosiak, "Tęsknię sobie" with Artur Rojek, "Audi" with Miętha, "Sen we śnie" with Grzegorz Turnau, "Baczyński (Pisz do mnie listy)" with Ania Dąbrowska, "Eldorado" with Daria Zawiałow, and "oscar" with Vito Bambino. The album was released on 15 April 2022. On 30 April, she went on her Uczta Tour; also known as Uczta u sanah, which ended on 8 June, with a concert in Warsaw. On October 14, she released ten more singles, each modeled on poems by Polish national bards, including Adam Mickiewicz, Wisława Szymborska and Adam Asnyk. Among them was also a poem by Edgar Allan Poe. They were not published in the form of an album, but Sanah collectively called them Poezyje. An old-school music video was created for each of the singles. In the autumn, Jurczak performed at a concert in New Jersey, United States. Before her trip, she visited the US ambassador to Poland, Mark Brzezinski.

On 22 September 2023, Sanah became the first Polish female solo artist to sell out Poland's largest stadium, the Stadion Narodowy, during a concert which marked the end of her "Uczta nad ucztami" (Feast above Feasts) Tour. The event was attended by around 70,000 fans and was preceded by two concerts at sold-out stadiums in Chorzów and Gdańsk. The historic tour was attended by 180,000 people overall.

== Personal life ==
In 2021, she became engaged to Stanisław Grabowski, who was also known as "ten Stan". The pair got married in 2022.

== Discography ==
- Królowa dram (2020)
- Irenka (2021)
- Uczta (2022)
- Sanah śpiewa poezyje (2022)
- Kaprysy (2024)
- Dwoje ludzieńków (2025)

== Awards and nominations ==
Year	Award	Category	Nominated work	Result	Ref.
2020	Fryderyk Awards	Debut of the Year	Herself	Nominated	
2020	Fryderyk Awards	Alternative Pop Album of the Year	Ja na imię niewidzialna mam	Nominated	
2020	Fryderyk Awards	Best New Performance	"Projekt nieznajomy nie kłamie"	Nominated	
2020	2020 MTV Europe Music Awards	Best Polish Act	Herself	Nominated	
2021	Fryderyk Awards	Album of the Year – Pop	Królowa dram	Won	
2021	Fryderyk Awards	Author of the Year	Herself	Nominated	
2021	Fryderyk Awards	Composer of the Year	Herself	Nominated	
2021	Fryderyk Awards	Song of the Year	"Szampan"	Nominated	
2021	Fryderyk Awards	Video of the Year	"Szampan"	Nominated	
2021	2021 MTV Europe Music Awards	Best Polish Act	Herself	Nominated	
2022	Fryderyk Awards	Album of the Year – Pop	Irenka	Won	
2022	Fryderyk Awards	Female Artist of the Year	Herself	Nominated	
2022	Fryderyk Awards	Author of the Year	Herself	Nominated	
2022	Fryderyk Awards	Composer of the Year	Herself (with Jakub Galiński as a composer team)	Nominated	
2022	Fryderyk Awards	Song of the Year	"Kolońska i szlugi"	Nominated	
2022	Fryderyk Awards	Video of the Year	"Kolońska i szlugi"	Nominated	
2023	Fryderyk Awards	Album of the Year – Pop	Uczta	Nominated	
2023	Fryderyk Awards	Album of the Year – Sung Poetry	Sanah śpiewa poezyje	Won	
2023	Fryderyk Awards	Female Artist of the Year	Herself	Won	
2023	Fryderyk Awards	Author of the Year	Herself	Nominated	
2023	Fryderyk Awards	Composer of the Year	Herself	Nominated	
2023	Fryderyk Awards	Video of the Year	"Nic dwa razy"	Nominated	
2023	2023 MTV Europe Music Awards	Best Polish Act	Herself	Nominated	
