= Bedoes =

Polish rapper and songwriter (born 1998)

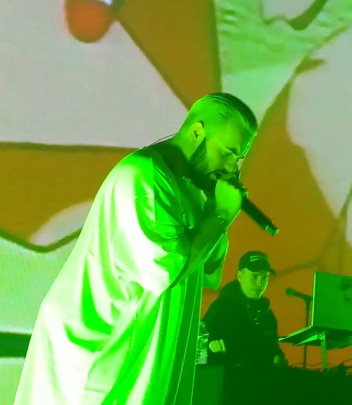
- Bedoes in Kraków (2019)

Background information
- Also known as: Bedoes 2115, Bedi, Bedi Soprano, Borek, Młody Borek
- Born: Borys Piotr Przybylski; April 21, 1998 (age 28); Bydgoszcz
- Occupations: Rapper, songwriter
- Instruments: Drums
- Years active: 2012–present
- Label: SBM Label. 2115 Gang

Borys Piotr Przybylski (born April 21, 1998), known professionally as Bedoes 2115, is a Polish rapper and songwriter, founder of the band 2115 Gang.

The musician belongs to the SBM Label and has furthermore collaborated with such artists as rappers Solar, Białas, White 2115, Taco Hemingway, Lanek, Young Multi, Quebonafide, and Canadian rapper Pressa. His first album, Aby śmierć miała znaczenie, received mixed reviews and reached the 1st place of the Polish charts – OLiS, selling more than 15 thousand copies. His next two studio albums, Kwiat polskiej młodzieży (with Kubi Producent) and Opowieści z Doliny Smoków (with Lanek), in addition to reaching the 1st place of the aforementioned list, got certified three times platinum and diamond respectively.

According to the Glamrap.pl website, he was awarded Debut of the Year in 2017. The single "05:05" earned him a nomination for the 2019 Fryderyk Award in the Hit of the Year category.

== Biography and career ==
=== 1998–2016: Early life and beginnings of career ===
Born in 1998, in Bydgoszcz, raised on the Bartodzieje estate. The rapper spent his childhood without a father, with his mother and his grandmother. At the age of 13 he began to make his first recordings, and at the age of 15 he recorded mixtapes such as Ganesha's Blessing, Gucci Watch, Najgrubszy z najmłodszych, Anubis's Throne, FR$HTILLIDIX. After graduating from junior high school, the rapper abandoned further education in favor of a music career. In 2014, he released a mixtape with 2115, TBK (To Bartodzieje Kurwo), which was released in a limited edition of 50 copies. Years later, the album made it to the list of Most Expensive and Hardest-to-Reach Albums in Polish rap. In 2016, another mixtape Squadshits was released. In the same year, the rapper got a contract on the SB Maffija label.

=== 2016–2017: Aby śmierć miała znaczenie and beef with Filipek ===
In September, his single "Gang, gang, gang" was released, thus the rapper announced the release of his debut album with Kubi Producent. The song reached No. 1 on the Hip-Hop chart. On December 16, another single, "Biały i młody" was released. The song, like the previous one, reached No. 1 on the Hip-Hop chart, and both hit 10 million views on YouTube in less than a year. Other singles came out in 2017, such as "NFZ," "Napad," "Raz," along with rapper from the same label Beteo, and "Kolega brata rapera." The album was released on February 17, 2017. The album reached No. 1 on the Polish charts – OLiS, selling more than 3,000 copies. The album was promoted by a nationwide tour Aby śmierć miała znaczenie Tour. Subsequently, the rapper took part in the action of the music website Popkiller, "Młode Wilki 2017." In 2017, he got into a stage conflict with rapper Filipek, who taunted him at his concert after the musician announced in an interview that he considered him the weakest rapper. The rapper started the conflict with the song, "AŚMZ," to which Filipek responded the same day with the song, "Mówię o twej karierze". The artist then issued a response "Pinokio," to which Filipek responded with the track "Łakałakałaka." The rapper ended the conflict with the song "Rocket Jump" by releasing it on Facebook. The musician was supported in the conflict by such rappers as Eldo, Te-Tris and WdoWa.

=== 2017–2019: Kwiat polskiej młodzieży and beef with Tomb and Dixon37 ===
On July 19, 2017, the rapper released the single "Gustaw," thereby announcing his new album. The music video was viewed by more than 10 million people in less than six months. On December 21, 2017, another single titled "05:05" was released with Kubi Producent. On January 4, 2018, a third single "Filipiny" was released also with Kubi Producent. On February 10, 2018, Bedoes, together with his SB Mafijja crew, played a concert at Warsaw's Stodoła club. There he uttered from the stage the words "If your favorite rapper is not from SB Maffija then he is probably sucking someone's dick right now." The words outraged many rappers such as Bilon, Zary, the Dixon37 group and TPS. The latter ridiculed SB Maffija, resulting in a long-running beef between him, Śliwa opposite Białas and Avi. Such rappers as Frosti Rege and Tomb, a former member of SB Maffija, recorded disses on Bedoes. The rapper responded to Tomb with a diss titled "Wpłatomat." Tomb responded to the number with a diss titled "Fatality," to which Bedoes no longer responded due to the fact that the rapper insulted his family there and included false information about him. On June 20 of the same year, the rapper released the single "Wow," as in previous cases also with Kubi Producent.

On November 6, 2018, he released another single titled "Kwiat Polskiej Młodzieży" which was the initiator of the conflict with Dixon37. Rest Dixon37 recorded a diss on the rapper titled "Chwast Polskich Głośników" to which Bedoes responded a few hours later with the song "00:45". A labelmate and publisher Białas joined the conflict behind the rapper, resulting in a long-running beef between him and rapper Kafar Dixon37. On November 14, 2018, he released another single titled "Janosik," which achieved commercial success, reaching 39th on the Airplay chart and was played on radios in Poland. On November 30, 2018, the album premiered and debuted at No. 1 on the Polish charts – OLiS, selling more than 30,000 copies. It was certified platinum. On May 29, 2019, he released a joint song with the Golec uOrkiestra band and well-known producer Gromee titled "Górą Ty." The song became a megahit, reaching as high as No. 2 on the Airplay chart and reached No. 1 on most radio stations in Poland.

=== 2019–present: Opowieści z Doliny Smoków, Rewolucja romantyczna, and Męskie Granie Orkiestra 2022 ===
On March 26, 2019, a track titled "Michelangelo" with Canadian rapper Pressa was released. It was the first announcement of the artist's new album. On June 2, 2019, the second single titled "Natchodzi lato" was released. In October, the rapper revealed that the new album would be called Opowieści z Doliny Smoków and was recorded with producer Lanek. On October 17, 2019, he released a single titled "Jesteś ładniejsza niż na zdjęciach (na zawsze)" which was recorded as a gift for the rapper's girlfriend and published on her birthday. The song was also played on Polish radio stations. On October 28, 2019, the title single from the album was released, and on November 10 the controversial single titled "1998 (mam to we krwi)" was released, where the rapper, among other things, expressed support for homosexual relationships. In November 2019, the rapper reported that his album sold more than 15,000 copies two weeks before its release.

On January 15, 2021, he released his fourth studio album Rewolucja romantyczna. It is certified double platinum.

In 2022, together with Kwiat Jabłoni and Krzysztof Zalewski, he formed the supergroup Męskie Granie Orkiestra 2022, as part of which they recorded the single "Jest tylko teraz."

== Private life ==
He is engaged to Roksana Kwiatkowska, former partner of rapper Quebonafide.

He is roman catholic.

== Discography ==
=== Albums ===
==== Studio albums ====
List of studio albums, with selected chart positions and certifications
Title	Details	Peak chart positions		Certifications
Title	Details	POL	POL Streaming	Certifications
Aby śmierć miała znaczenie (with Kubi Producent)	Released: February 17, 2017; Label: SBM Label, Step Hurt; Formats: CD, DL, streaming	1	*	ZPAV: Platinum
Kwiat polskiej młodzieży (with Kubi Producent)	Released: November 30, 2018; Label: SBM Label; Formats: CD, DL, streaming	1	74	ZPAV: 4× Platinum
Opowieści z Doliny Smoków (with Lanek)	Released: November 29, 2019; Label: SBM Label; Formats: CD, LP, DL, streaming	1	26	ZPAV: Diamond
Rewolucja romantyczna (with Lanek)	Released: January 15, 2021; Label: SBM Label; Formats: CD, LP, DL, streaming	1	*	ZPAV: 2× Platinum
Rodzinny biznes (as part of 2115, with White 2115)	Released: December 16, 2022; Label: 2115; Formats: CD, DL, streaming	1	1	ZPAV: Platinum

=== Extended plays ===
List of extended plays
Title	Details
2114 (with Lanek)	Released: January 17, 2014; Labels: Freshville Records, SB Maffija (Re-edition); Formats: CD, DL, streaming
2119 (with Lanek)	Released: November 29, 2019; Labels: SBM Label; Formats: CD, DL, streaming

=== Mixtapes ===
List of mixtapes
Title	Details
Ganesha's Blessing	Released: February 3, 2013; Labels: Miami Hit Music; Formats: DL, streaming
Gucci Watch	Released: July 2, 2013; Labels: Miami Hit Music; Formats: DL, streaming
Najgrubszy z najmłodszych	Released: July 2013; Labels: Miami Hit Music; Formats: DL, streaming
Anubis's Throne	Released: July 16, 2013; Labels: Freshville Records; Formats: DL, streaming
Fr$htillidix	Released: December 22, 2013; Labels: Freshville Records; Formats: CD, DL, streaming
TBK (To Bartodzieje Kurwo) (with 2115 Gang)	Released: December 22, 2014; Labels: Freshville Records; Formats: CD, DL, streaming
Squadshits (with 2115 Gang)	Released: June 13, 2016; Labels: SB Maffija; Formats: CD, DL, streaming
Piosenki o miłości (with 2115 Gang)	Released: February 17, 2017; Labels: SB Maffija, Step Hurt; Formats: CD, DL, streaming

=== Singles ===
==== As lead artist ====
List of singles as lead artist, with selected chart positions, showing year released and album name
Title	Year	Peak chart positions	Certifications	Album or EP
Title	Year	POL	Certifications	Album or EP
"1998" (with Lanek)	2014	—		2114
"NaNaNa (Remix)" (featuring Zui)	2016	—		Squadshits (Bootleg)
"Gang, gang, gang" (with Kubi Producent)	2016	—	ZPAV: Platinum	Aby śmierć miała znaczenie
"Biały i młody" (with Kubi Producent)	2016	—	ZPAV: 2× Platinum	Aby śmierć miała znaczenie
"NFZ" (with Kubi Producent)	2017	—		Aby śmierć miała znaczenie
"Napad" (with Kubi Producent)	2017	—	ZPAV: Platinum	Aby śmierć miała znaczenie
"Raz" (with Kubi Producent featuring Beteo)	2017	—		Aby śmierć miała znaczenie
"Kolega brata rapera" (with Kubi Producent)	2017	—		Aby śmierć miała znaczenie
"Gustaw"	2017	—	ZPAV: Platinum	Totalnie nic Mixtape
"05:05" (with Kubi Producent)	2017	—	ZPAV: 3× Platinum	Kwiat polskiej młodzieży
"Filipiny" (with Kubi Producent)	2018	—		Non-album single
"Wow"	2018	—	ZPAV: Platinum	Kwiat polskiej młodzieży
"Gucci Mane" (with Deemz and Young Multi)	2018	—	ZPAV: Platinum	Kwiat polskiej młodzieży
"Kwiat polskiej młodzieży" (with Kubi Producent)	2018	—	ZPAV: 2× Platinum	Kwiat polskiej młodzieży
"Janosik" (with Kubi Producent, featuring Golec uOrkiestra)	2018	39	ZPAV: 3× Platinum	Kwiat polskiej młodzieży
"Toy Story" (with Kubi Producent, featuring Rafonix)	2018	—	ZPAV: Platinum	Kwiat polskiej młodzieży
"Gady" (with Kubi Producent, Białas and Eldo)	2018	—	ZPAV: Platinum	Kwiat polskiej młodzieży
"Michelangelo" (with Lanek, featuring Pressa)	2019	—	ZPAV: Platinum	Opowieści z Doliny Smoków
"Nadchodzi lato" (with Lanek)	2019	—	ZPAV: 3× Platinum	Opowieści z Doliny Smoków
"Hardcore Plesaure" (with Lanek featuring Flexxy 2115, Kuqe 2115)	2019	—	ZPAV: Gold	Opowieści z Doliny Smoków
"FPS" (with Lanek)	2019	—	ZPAV: 2× Platinum	Opowieści z Doliny Smoków
"Jesteś ładniejsza niż na zdjęciach (na zawsze)" (with Lanek)	2019	—	ZPAV: Diamond	Opowieści z Doliny Smoków
"Opowieści z doliny smoków" (with Lanek)	2019	—	ZPAV: Diamond	Opowieści z Doliny Smoków
"1998 (Mam to we krwi)" (with Lanek)	2019	—	ZPAV: 2× Platinum	Opowieści z Doliny Smoków
"Brzydkie rzeczy" (with Lanek and DJ Johny)	2019	—	ZPAV: 2× Platinum	Opowieści z Doliny Smoków
"Lost" (with Lanek and Taco Hemingway)	2019	—		2119
"Rewolucja romantyczna" (with Lanek and Blu)	2020	—		Rewolucja romantyczna
"Chrome Hearts /" (with Lanek)	2020	—		Rewolucja romantyczna
"Toa$t /" (with Lanek)	2021	—		Rewolucja romantyczna
"Bukiet białych róż (Squadshit #13) /" (with Lanek and Blu)	2021	—		Rewolucja romantyczna
"Doda :*" (with Lanek)	2021	—		Rewolucja romantyczna
"—" denotes a recording that did not chart or was not released in that territory.

==== As featured artist ====
List of singles as featured artist, with selected chart positions and certifications, showing album name and year released
Title	Year	Peak chart positions		Certifications	Album or EP
Title	Year	POL	POL Streaming	Certifications	Album or EP
"Patrzcie idzie frajer" (Białas featuring Bedoes)	2016	—	*		H8M4
"Besos" (Beteo featuring Bedoes)	2017	—	*		Bejbi
"Na serio" (Białas and Lanek featuring Bedoes)	2017	—	*		Polon
"Diamenty" (Young Multi featuring Bedoes)	2017	—	*	ZPAV: Gold	Nowa fala
"Eldorado" (Deemz featuring Bedoes and PlanBe)	2017	—	*	ZPAV: Diamond	Sauce
"Braciszku" (Blacha featuring Bedoes)	2018	—	*	ZPAV: Platinum	Trapical Moon
"Choker" (Miyo featuring Bedoes)	2018	—	*		Non-album single
"Górą Ty" (Golec uOrkiestra and Gromee featuring Bedoes)	2019	2	*		Symphoetnic
"Jestem zdrowy" (Solar featuring Bedoes)	2019	—	*	ZPAV: Gold	Pokój zero
"Na osiedlu" (Szpaku and Kubi Producent featuring Bedoes)	2020	—	*	ZPAV: Gold	Dzieci duchy
"Dla sióstr" (SB Maffija featuring Bedoes, Białas, White 2115)	2020	—	*		Hotel Maffija
"Brak słów" (Sentino featuring Bedoes)	2020	—	*		Non-album single
"Marzenia" (Mr. Polska featuring Bedoes)	2020	—	*	ZPAV: 2× Platinum	Bajki na dobranoc
"Najlepsze dni" (Eis featuring Bedoes)	2020	—	*		Gdzie jest Eis?
"Parapetówa" (SB Maffija featuring White 2115, Janusz Walczuk, Lanek, Bedoes, Jan-Rapowanie, Kacperczyk, Białas, Adi Nowak, Fukaj, Skute Bobo, Beteo, Kinny Zimmer, Solar)	2022	—	*		Hotel Maffija 2
"Chodzę po Luwrze" (SB Maffija featuring Jan-Rapowanie, Bedoes, Białas, Solar, Janusz Walczuk)	2022	—	*		Hotel Maffija 2
"Lawenda" (SB Maffija featuring White 2115, Białas, Kinny Zimmer and Bedoes)	2022	24	50		Hotel Maffija 2
"Pancerz" (SB Maffija featuring Bedoes, Fukaj, Jan-Rapowanie)	2022	—	*		Hotel Maffija 2
"Więcej dymu" (2115 featuring Bedoes, White 2115 and Flexxy 2115)	2022	—	*	ZPAV: Gold	Rodzinny biznes
"Bedoesiara" (2115 featuring Bedoes and White 2115)	2022	—	77	ZPAV: Platinum	Rodzinny biznes
"Jest tylko teraz" (Męskie Granie Orkiestra 2022 featuring Bedoes, Kwiat Jabłoni and Krzysztof Zalewski)	2022	10	*		Męskie Granie 2022
"Na krańcu świata" (2115 featuring Bedoes, White 2115 and Kuqe 2115)	2022	—	26	ZPAV: Gold	Rodzinny biznes
"Ketchup" (2115 featuring Bedoes, Blacha 2115, White 2115 and Kuqe 2115)	2022	—	18	ZPAV: Platinum	Rodzinny biznes
"I'm a Star Now" (2115 featuring Bedoes, White 2115, Pressa, Blacha 2115, Kuqe 2115 and Flexxy 2115)	2022	—	—		Rodzinny biznes
"—" denotes a recording that did not chart or was not released in that territory.

=== Other charted or certified songs ===
List of other songs as lead or featured artist, with selected chart positions, showing year released and album name
Title	Year	Peak chart positions		Certifications	Album or EP
Title	Year	POL	POL Streaming	Certifications	Album or EP
"Chłopaki nie płaczą" (with Kubi Producent, featuring Taco Hemingway)	2018	—	*	ZPAV: 3× Platinum	Kwiat polskiej młodzieży
"Rivendell" (with Kubi Producent)	2018	—	*	ZPAV: Gold	Kwiat polskiej młodzieży
"Mercedes GLE Coupé" (with Kubi Producent, featuring Blacha 2115, Kuqe 2115 and Flexxy 2115)	2018	—	*	ZPAV: Gold	Kwiat polskiej młodzieży
"Bardzo przepraszam" (with Kubi Producent)	2018	—	*	ZPAV: Gold	Kwiat polskiej młodzieży
"1000 koni" (with Kubi Producent)	2018	—	*	ZPAV: Gold	Kwiat polskiej młodzieży
"Delfin" (with Kubi Producent, featuring Koldi, Young Multi and Beteo)	2018	—	*	ZPAV: 2× Platinum	Kwiat polskiej młodzieży
"Sauvage" (with Lanek, featuring Białas and Taco Hemingway)	2019	—	*	ZPAV: Gold	Opowieści z doliny smoków
"Wschód (lubię zapierdalać)" (with Lanek featuring Kosa and White 2115)	2019	—	*	ZPAV: Platinum	Opowieści z doliny smoków
"Smoki" (with Lanek)	2019	—	*	ZPAV: Platinum	Opowieści z doliny smoków
"Vogue" (with Lanek)	2019	—	*	ZPAV: 3× Platinum	Opowieści z doliny smoków
"Lesbijki" (with Lanek)	2019	—	*	ZPAV: Gold	Opowieści z doliny smoków
"Fresh Prince (trill 4ever)" (with Lanek, featuring Malik Montana)	2019	—	*	ZPAV: Gold	Opowieści z doliny smoków
"Łzy (pierwszy kawałek na tej płycie)" (with Lanek featuring Kuqe 2115)	2019	—	*	ZPAV: Platinum	Opowieści z doliny smoków
"Playboy (dla Lanka)" (with Lanek featuring Blacha 2115)	2019	—	*	ZPAV: Gold	Opowieści z doliny smoków
"Dresscode" (2115 featuring Bedoes, White 2115 and Taco Hemingway)	2022	73	1		Rodzinny biznes
"Glow Up" (2115 featuring Blacha 2115, Kuqe 2115, Flexxy 2115, Bedoes and Wersow)	2022	—	6		Rodzinny biznes
"Weekend 2115" (2115 featuring Bedoes, Kuqe 2115, Blacha 2115 and Flexxy 2115)	2022	—	43		Rodzinny biznes
"Diamenty" (2115 featuring Bedoes, White 2115 and Doda)	2022	—	75		Rodzinny biznes
"—" denotes a recording that did not chart or was not released in that territory.

=== Other songs ===
List of other songs, showing album name and year released
Title	Year	Album or EP
"Puszki, kartony, butelki"	2015	Squadshits (Bootleg)
"AŚMZ" (Filipek Diss)	2017	Non-album songs
"Pinokio" (Filipek Diss)	2017	Non-album songs
"Rocket jump" (Filipek Diss)	2017	Non-album songs
"Wpłatomat" (Tomb Diss)	2018	Non-album songs
"0:45" (Dixon37 Diss)	2018	Non-album songs
"#Hot16Challenge2"	2020	#Hot16Challenge2
