= List of number-one singles of 2023 (Poland) =

This is a list of the songs that reached number-one position in official Polish single charts in 2023:

- OLiA (Official Airplay Chart), published by ZPAV
- OLiS – Streaming singles, published by ZPAV
- Poland Songs, published by Billboard (as a part of Hits of the World)

== Chart history ==
OLiA (Official Airplay Chart)			OLiS – Streaming singles			Billboard Poland Songs			
Issue date (Note: Last day of week covered by the chart (Saturday to Friday). The chart is published next Monday.)	Song	Artist(s)	Issue date (Note: Last day of week covered by the chart (Friday to Thursday). The chart is published next Thursday.)	Song	Artist(s)	Issue date (Note: Issue date by Billboard (Saturday). The chart covers week starting 15 days earlier (Friday to Thursday).)	Song	Artist(s)	Ref.
						January 7	"Last Christmas"	Wham!	
January 6	"To co masz Ty!"	Dawid Podsiadło	January 5	"Dresscode"	2115 featuring Taco Hemingway	January 14	"Dresscode"	2115 featuring Taco Hemingway	
January 13	"Made You Look"	Meghan Trainor	January 12	"Dresscode"	2115 featuring Taco Hemingway	January 21	"Dresscode"	2115 featuring Taco Hemingway	
January 20	"Wonders"	Michael Patrick Kelly featuring Rakim	January 19	"Flowers"	Miley Cyrus	January 28	"Flowers"	Miley Cyrus	
January 27	"Wonders"	Michael Patrick Kelly featuring Rakim	January 26	"Flowers"	Miley Cyrus	February 4	"Flowers"	Miley Cyrus	
February 3	"Wonders"	Michael Patrick Kelly featuring Rakim	February 2	"Flowers"	Miley Cyrus	February 11	"Flowers"	Miley Cyrus	
February 10	"Flowers"	Miley Cyrus	February 9	"Flowers"	Miley Cyrus	February 18	"Flowers"	Miley Cyrus	
February 17	"Flowers"	Miley Cyrus	February 16	"Flowers"	Miley Cyrus	February 25	"Flowers"	Miley Cyrus	
February 24	"Flowers"	Miley Cyrus	February 23	"Flowers"	Miley Cyrus	March 4	"Flowers"	Miley Cyrus	
March 3	"Flowers"	Miley Cyrus	March 2	"Flowers"	Miley Cyrus	March 11	"Flowers"	Miley Cyrus	
March 10	"Flowers"	Miley Cyrus	March 9	"Flowers"	Miley Cyrus	March 18	"Flowers"	Miley Cyrus	
March 17	"Flowers"	Miley Cyrus	March 16	"Flowers"	Miley Cyrus	March 25	"Flowers"	Miley Cyrus	
March 24	"Flowers"	Miley Cyrus	March 23	"Uzi"	Białas featuring Sobel	April 1	"Uzi"	Białas featuring Sobel	
March 31	"Mori"	Dawid Podsiadło	March 30	"Uzi"	Białas featuring Sobel	April 8	"Uzi"	Białas featuring Sobel	
April 7	"Mori"	Dawid Podsiadło	April 6	"Uzi"	Białas featuring Sobel	April 15	"Uzi"	Białas featuring Sobel	
April 14	"Mori"	Dawid Podsiadło	April 13	"Uzi"	Białas featuring Sobel	April 22	"Uzi"	Białas featuring Sobel	
April 21	"Mori"	Dawid Podsiadło	April 20	"Daylight"	David Kushner	April 29	"Daylight"	David Kushner	
April 28	"Gossip"	Måneskin featuring Tom Morello	April 27	"Marcepan"	Sanah	May 6	"Marcepan"	Sanah	
May 5	"Lottery"	Latto featuring Lu Kala	May 4	"Marcepan"	Sanah	May 13	"Marcepan"	Sanah	
May 12	"Lottery"	Latto featuring Lu Kala	May 11	"Marcepan"	Sanah	May 20	"Marcepan"	Sanah	
May 19	"Lottery"	Latto featuring Lu Kala	May 18	"Solo"	Blanka	May 27	"Cha Cha Cha"	Käärijä	
May 26	"Lottery"	Latto featuring Lu Kala	May 25	"Taxi"	Kizo featuring Bletka	June 3	"Taxi"	Kizo featuring Bletka	
June 2	"Forget You"	Fast Boy and Topic	June 1	"Taxi"	Kizo featuring Bletka	June 10	"Taxi"	Kizo featuring Bletka	
June 9	"Trustfall"	Pink	June 8	"Taxi"	Kizo featuring Bletka	June 17	"Taxi"	Kizo featuring Bletka	
June 16	"Trustfall"	Pink	June 15	"5 influencerek"	Zeamsone	June 24	"5 influencerek"	Zeamsone	
June 23	"Supermoce"	Męskie Granie Orkiestra 2023	June 22	"5 influencerek"	Zeamsone	July 1	"5 influencerek"	Zeamsone	
June 30	"Supermoce"	Męskie Granie Orkiestra 2023	June 29	"5 influencerek"	Zeamsone	July 8	"5 influencerek"	Zeamsone	
July 7	"Waterfall"	Michael Schulte and R3hab	July 6	"5 influencerek"	Zeamsone	July 15	"5 influencerek"	Zeamsone	
July 14	"Supermoce"	Męskie Granie Orkiestra 2023	July 13	"5 influencerek"	Zeamsone	July 22	"5 influencerek"	Zeamsone	
July 21	"Supermoce"	Męskie Granie Orkiestra 2023	July 20	"5 influencerek"	Zeamsone	July 29	"5 influencerek"	Zeamsone	
July 28	"Supermoce"	Męskie Granie Orkiestra 2023	July 27	"5 influencerek"	Zeamsone	August 5	"Taxi"	Kizo featuring Bletka	
August 4	"Fifi Hollywood"	Daria Zawiałow	August 3	"Taxi"	Kizo featuring Bletka	August 12	"Taxi"	Kizo featuring Bletka	
August 11	"Baby Said"	Måneskin	August 10	"Taxi"	Kizo featuring Bletka	August 19	"Taxi"	Kizo featuring Bletka	
August 18	"Supermoce"	Męskie Granie Orkiestra 2023	August 17	"Nim zajdzie słońce"	Smolasty and Doda	August 26	"Nim zajdzie słońce"	Smolasty and Doda	
August 25	"Italodisco"	The Kolors	August 24	"Nim zajdzie słońce"	Smolasty and Doda	September 2	"Nim zajdzie słońce"	Smolasty and Doda	
September 1	"Italodisco"	The Kolors	August 31	"Nim zajdzie słońce"	Smolasty and Doda	September 9	"Nim zajdzie słońce"	Smolasty and Doda	
September 8	"Tańcz głupia"	Margaret	September 7	"Nim zajdzie słońce"	Smolasty and Doda	September 16	"Nim zajdzie słońce"	Smolasty and Doda	
September 15	"Italodisco"	The Kolors	September 14	"Nicea"	PRO8L3M	September 23	"Nicea"	PRO8L3M	
September 22	"Italodisco"	The Kolors	September 21	"Nicea"	PRO8L3M	September 30	"Nicea"	PRO8L3M	
September 29	"Nim zajdzie słońce"	Smolasty and Doda	September 28	"Cichosza"	Taco Hemingway featuring Otsochodzi	October 7	"Cichosza"	Taco Hemingway featuring Otsochodzi	
October 6	"Nim zajdzie słońce"	Smolasty and Doda	October 5	"Jeremy Sochan"	Oki	October 14	"Jeremy Sochan"	Oki	
October 13	"Nim zajdzie słońce"	Smolasty and Doda	October 12	"Fluid"	ReTo	October 21	"Fluid"	ReTo	
October 20	"Od nowa"	Kwiat Jabłoni	October 19	"Fluid"	ReTo	October 28	"Fluid"	ReTo	
October 27	"Nim zajdzie słońce"	Smolasty and Doda	October 26	"Fluid"	ReTo	November 4	"Fluid"	ReTo	
November 3	"Nim zajdzie słońce"	Smolasty and Doda	November 2	"BFF"	Bambi and Young Leosia	November 11	"BFF"	Bambi and Young Leosia	
November 10	"Nim zajdzie słońce"	Smolasty and Doda	November 9	"BFF"	Bambi and Young Leosia	November 18	"BFF"	Bambi and Young Leosia	
November 17	"Z Tobą na chacie"	Daria Zawiałow	November 16	"BFF"	Bambi and Young Leosia	November 25	"BFF"	Bambi and Young Leosia	
November 24	"Z Tobą na chacie"	Daria Zawiałow	November 23	"BFF"	Bambi and Young Leosia	December 2	"BFF"	Bambi and Young Leosia	
December 1	"Z Tobą na chacie"	Daria Zawiałow	November 30	"BFF"	Bambi and Young Leosia	December 9	"BFF"	Bambi and Young Leosia	
December 8	"Overdrive"	Ofenbach featuring Norma Jean Martine	December 7	"Last Christmas"	Wham!	December 16	"Last Christmas"	Wham!	
December 15	"Overdrive"	Ofenbach featuring Norma Jean Martine	December 14	"Last Christmas"	Wham!	December 23	"Last Christmas"	Wham!	
December 22	"Dzięki, że jesteś"	Lanberry and Tribbs	December 21	"Last Christmas"	Wham!	December 30	"Last Christmas"	Wham!	
December 29	"Overdrive"	Ofenbach featuring Norma Jean Martine	December 28	"Last Christmas"	Wham!				

== Number-one artists ==
=== OLiA ===
List of number-one artists by total weeks at number one
Position	Artist	Weeks at No. 1
1	Miley Cyrus	7
2	Męskie Granie Orkiestra 2023	6
2	Smolasty	6
2	Doda	6
3	Dawid Podsiadło	5
4	Latto	4
4	Lu Kala	4
4	The Kolors	4
4	Daria Zawiałow	4
5	Michael Patrick Kelly	3
5	Rakim	3
5	Ofenbach	3
5	Norma Jean Martine	3
6	Pink	2
6	Måneskin	2
7	Meghan Trainor	1
7	Tom Morello	1
7	Fast Boy	1
7	Topic	1
7	Michael Schulte	1
7	R3hab	1
7	Margaret	1
7	Kwiat Jabłoni	1
7	Lanberry	1
7	Tribbs	1

=== OLiS – Streaming chart ===
List of number-one artists by total weeks at number one
Position	Artist	Weeks at No. 1
1	Miley Cyrus	9
2	Zeamsone	7
3	Kizo	5
3	Bletka	5
3	Bambi	5
3	Young Leosia	5
4	Białas	4
4	Sobel	4
4	Smolasty	4
4	Doda	4
4	Wham!	4
5	Sanah	3
5	Taco Hemingway	3
5	ReTo	3
6	2115	2
6	PRO8L3M	2
7	David Kushner	1
7	Blanka	1
7	Otsochodzi	1
7	Oki	1

=== Billboard Poland Songs ===
List of number-one artists by total weeks at number one
Position	Artist	Weeks at No. 1
1	Miley Cyrus	9
2	Zeamsone	6
2	Kizo	6
2	Bletka	6
3	Bambi	5
3	Young Leosia	5
4	Białas	4
4	Sobel	4
4	Smolasty	4
4	Doda	4
4	Wham!	4
5	Sanah	3
5	Taco Hemingway	3
5	ReTo	3
6	2115	2
6	PRO8L3M	2
7	David Kushner	1
7	Käärijä	1
7	Otsochodzi	1
7	Oki	1

== See also ==
- Polish music charts
- List of number-one albums of 2023 (Poland)
