= Young Leosia =

Polish musical artist

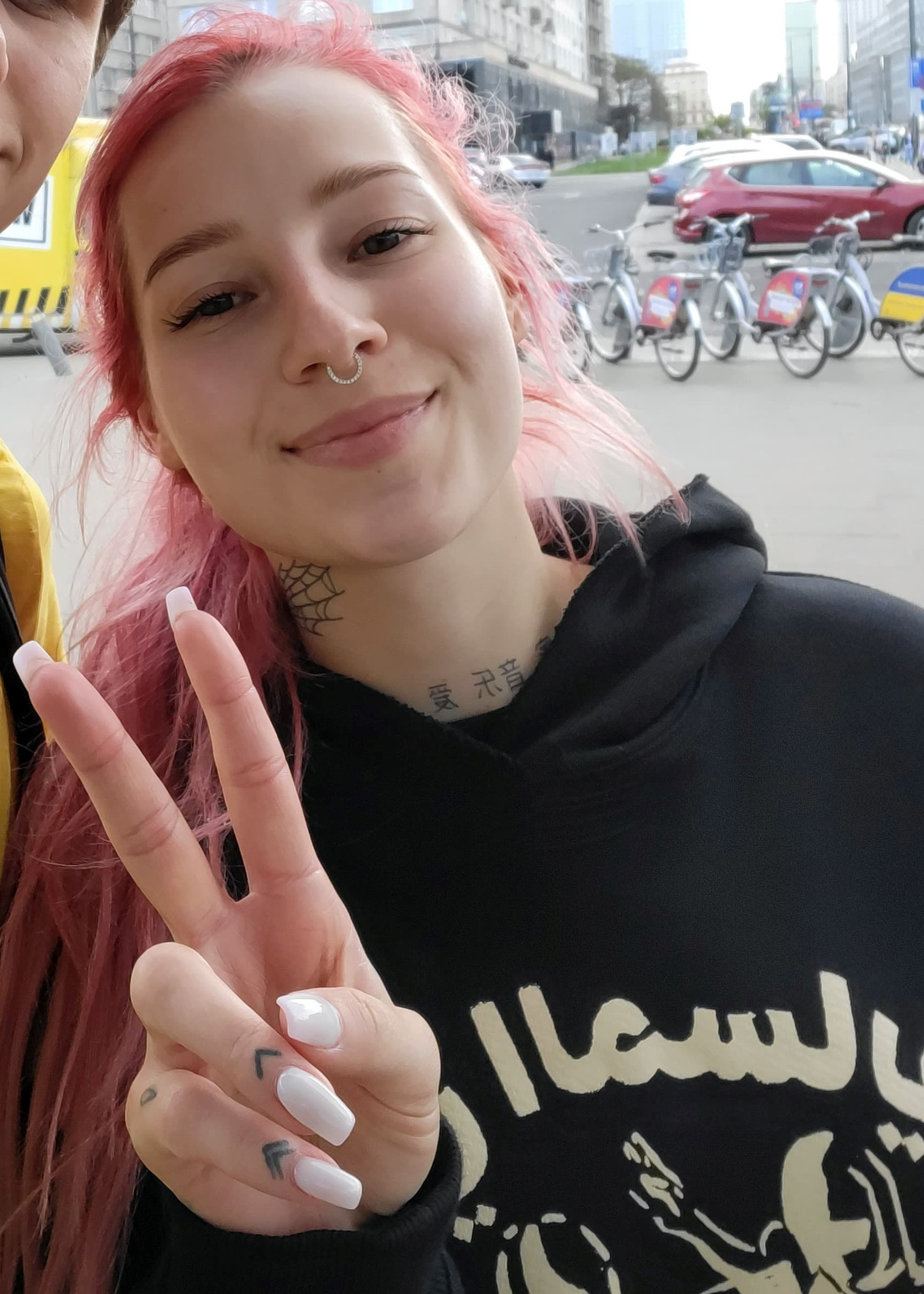
- Born: Sara Leokadia Sudoł; 13 August 1998 (age 28); Szczecin, Poland
- Occupations: Singer; rapper; DJ
- Years active: 2015–present

Sara Leokadia Sudoł (born 13 August 1998 in Szczecin), known professionally as Young Leosia (formerly Sara) is a Polish singer, rapper, songwriter, sound engineer and DJ.

== Life ==
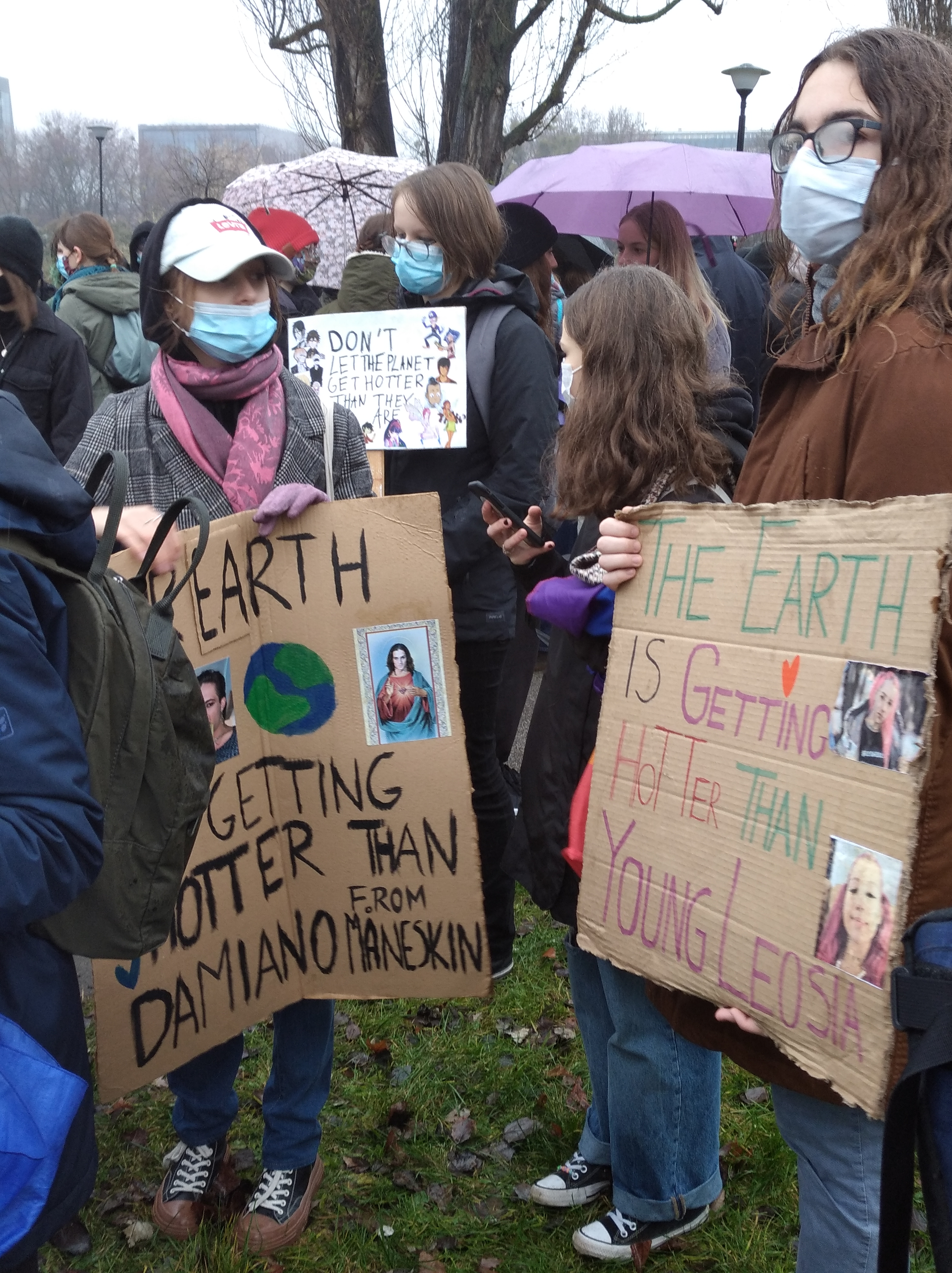
Damiano David and Young Leosia's photos on the School Strike for Climate banners in Warsaw – "The Earth is getting hotter than Young Leosia/Damiano from Måneskin"

=== Education ===
She was a student of The Heroes of Monte Cassino IX Lyceum in Szczecin. When Sudoł was younger, she attended hip-hop and dancehall dance lessons. She is a graduate of the Elżbeta Zapendowska Song School. Sudoł also passed the sound production exam.

=== Music career ===
Sudol was working in a lot of Polish clubs (e.g. Prozak 2.0, Miłość Kredytowa, Mewa Towarzyska, Newonce Bar) as a DJ. She recorded her first songs since 2015 as Sara.

On 6 August 2020, Young Leosia made her debut with single "Wyspy", which, however, went unnoticed, as did the next one called "Zakochałam się, ale zryłeś", which she recorded with the band B24.

On 16 October 2020, together with Polish rappers Żabson, Beteo and Borucci, Young Leosia released the single "ULALA". Also in 2020, she sang as a guest in the song by Czech rapper Nik Tendo called "Loyal".

Young Leosia gained the greatest popularity in 2021 thanks to the single "Szklanki", which reached the top of the Polish Apple Music and Spotify lists. She made a music video for the song, which by December 2021 was viewed almost 29 million times on YouTube. In June, she played the lead role in Mata's music video for the song "Kiss cam (podryw roku)". On 6 August she released the single "Jungle Girl", which she recorded in cooperation with Żabson. The song was on her debut EP entitled Hulanki, which was released on 23 September by Internaziomale label. On 24 September she published a music video for the song "Baila Ella", which exceeded over 15 million views on YouTube.

On 17 March 2022 Rybnik rapper Jacuś released the disco single "Piątek wieczór" featuring Young Leosia. On 1 April 2022 rapper Smolasty released "Boję Się Kochać" featuring her.

On 21 April 2022 Young Leosia and Mata (also known as Skute Bobo) have released a single featuring three songs in support of the "Fundacja420" which fights for the legalization of marijuana in Poland. On 25 April 2022 she released the single "Rok Tygrysa", the music video for which was criticized by the media as an advertisement for the Tiger energy drink.

On 20 November, Young Leosia announced the event Baila Ella by Young Leosia: First Night Out , along with a series of parties organized by Baila Ella. On 25 November, she released the single Crowd through her own label, Baila Ella Records, marking her departure from the Internaziomale label. She featured on the eponymous album Club2020, contributing to the tracks Malibu Barbie (featuring rappers Taco Hemingway, Otsochodzi, OKI, Dwa Sławy, and Gruby Mielzky) with this being released in January and February 2023.

== Discography ==
=== Studio albums ===
Title	Album details	Peak chart positions	Certifications
Title	Album details	POL	Certifications
Atmosfera	Released: 24 October 2024; Label: BE Records	3	POL: Platinum
VILLA MOMBASA MIXTAPE (with Waima, Janusz Walczuk, Zuziula & Olinda)	Released: 12 May 2026; Label: BE Records	—	—

=== EPs ===
Title	Album details	Peak chart positions	Certifications
Title	Album details	POL	Certifications
Hulanki	Released: 23 September 2021; Label: Internaziomale; Formats: CD, LP, digital download, streaming	1	POL: Gold
PG$ (with Bambi)	Released: 7 March 2024; Label: BE Records; Formats: CD, digital download & streaming	2	POL: Gold

=== Singles ===
Title	Year	Certifications	Album
"Wyspy"	2020	—	Hulanki
"Zakochałam się, ale zryłeś" (with B24)	2020	—	Sezon 01
"ULALA" (with Żabson and Beteo, featuring Borucci)	2020	POL: Gold	Ziomalski Mixtape
"Palo Santo" (with Żabson, Janusz Walczuk & Beteo)	2021		Ziomalski Mixtape
"Szklanki"	2021	POL: Platinum	Hulanki
"Jungle Girl" (with Żabson)	2021	—	Hulanki
"Baila Ella"	2021	—	Hulanki
"Stonerki" (with Oliwka Brazil)	2021	—	Hulanki
"Piątek wieczór" (with Jacuś)	2022	—	Prezes
"Boję się kochać" (with Smolasty)	2022	—	—
"#Fundacja420" "Wyspa nadziei" / "Cicho" / "KC" (as Young Bobo with Mata)	2022	—	—
"Rok Tygrysa"	2022	—	—
"CROWD"	2022	—	—
"Malibu Barbie" (with Oki, club2020, Taco Hemingway, Dwa Sławy & Gruby Mielzky)	2023	—	club2020
"CYPHER2022" (with club2020, Oki & Young Igi)	2023	—	club2020
"No weź" (with Oki, Young Igi & Taco Hemingway)	2023	—	club2020
"Candy Flip" (with club2020, DZIARMA & Margaret)	2023	—	club2020
"Wszystko gra" (with club2020, Oki & Young Igi)	2023	—	club2020
"Zadzwonię później" (with Oki & Young Igi)	2023	—	club2020
"Nakaz" (with club2020 & Young Igi)	2023	—	club2020 Mixtape
"SHOOT" (with Meggie)	2023	—	—
"Jeden dzień"	2023	—	—
"KICI MEOW" (with ReTo)	2023	—	—
"Nie wiem o co chodzi"	2023	—	—
"Lepszy model ale to UK GARAGE" (with Młody Klakson, Mr. Polska & Kasia Klich)	2023	—	—
"Cringowy Lovesong"	2023	—	—
"Skippers" (with Bambi, Janusz Walczuk & Waima)	2023	—	—
"BFF" (with Bambi & PG$)	2024	POL: 4× Platinum	PG$
"Double Match" (with Bambi & PG$)	2024	—	PG$
"PG$" (with Bambi & PG$)	2024	—	PG$
"Headhunter" (with Bambi & PG$)	2024	—	PG$
"Przester" (with bambi & PG$)	2024	—	PG$
"Te numery" (with bambi & PG$)	2024	—	PG$
"Mroczna Komnata" (with Kubi Producent, Zeamsone & Waima)	2024	—	—
"LECĘ BO CHCĘ" (with Deemz, bambi, Kizo & Waima)	2024	—	—
"Heart Sped Up (BFF)" (with Ely Oaks, Niklas Dee & bambi)	2024	—	—
"Z LOTNISKA DO STUDIA" (with Duszyn)	2024	—	Def Jam World Tour: Berlin
"NIE GADAM Z NIKIM DZISIAJ" (with Duszyn)	2024	—	Def Jam World Tour: Berlin
"SOBOTA WIECZÓR" (with Jacuś)	2024	—	ATMOSFERA
"Noc Aniołów"	2024	—	ATMOSFERA
"Atmosfera"	2024	—	ATMOSFERA
"Przestrzeń"	2024	—	ATMOSFERA
"Delay"	2024	—	ATMOSFERA
"6 Nieodebranych"	2024	—	ATMOSFERA
"Nie mów nic"	2024	—	ATMOSFERA
"Papier" (with bambi)	2024	—	ATMOSFERA
"Fun House"	2024	—	ATMOSFERA
"Wszystko mi jedno"	2024	—	ATMOSFERA
"Złoty piasek"	2024	—	ATMOSFERA
"Błękitne niebo"	2024	—	ATMOSFERA
"Dobra Robota" (with Bambi, Janusz Walczuk & Waima)	2024	—	—
"FAKELOVE" (with Beteo)	2025	—	—
"Różowe Diamenty"	2025	—	—
"WIĘCEJ MIEJSCA" (with Tede & Yottsu)	2025		
"Mam plan" (with Zuziula)	2025	—	—
"PLN" (with Kizo & Deemz)	2025	—	—
"Ej Agatka"	2025	—	—
"Dobranoc"	2025	—	—
"ZNASZ MNIE" (with Zuziula)	2026	—	WARM UP
"ROLLOUT" (with Janusz Walczuk, Waima, Zuziula & Olinda)	2026	—	VILLA MOMBASA MIXTAPE
"CHCĘ TAK" (with Zuziula & Olinda)	2026	—	VILLA MOMBASA MIXTAPE
"FREAK" (with Malik Montana)	2026	—	—
"BIG ROLLY PHANTOM" (with Waima)	2026	—	VILLA MOMBASA MIXTAPE
"CARITAS" (with Waima & Zuziula)	2026	—	VILLA MOMBASA MIXTAPE
"STARS" (with Olinda & Zuziula)	2026	—	VILLA MOMBASA MIXTAPE
"NA ZDROWIE" (with Waima, Zuziula, Janusz Walczuk & Olinda)	2026	—	VILLA MOMBASA MIXTAPE
"INDUSTRY BLUNT" (with Deemz, Zuziula & Janusz Walczuk)	2026	—	VILLA MOMBASA MIXTAPE
"SHAME" (with Janusz Walczuk)	2026	—	VILLA MOMBASA MIXTAPE
"TUFF" (with Oliwka Brazil)	2026	—	—
"MARBELLA" (with Amar)	2026	—	—
"Aftery Pod Blokiem"	2026	—	—
"POZIOMKI" (with GENZIE)	2026	—	—
"Most Wanted" (with Albert RCB & PlanBe)	2026	—	—
"$wag Boy"	2026	—	—
"LEJ MI BBY" (with Maja)	2026	—	—
"Pesele" (with Liber, Mycy & Adash)	2026	—	—
"DYMI2"	2026	—	—

== Awards and nominations ==
Year	Ceremony	Category	Results
2020	Plebiscyt Sanki 2021		Finalist
2022	Fryderyki 2022	Phonographic Debut of the Year	Nominated
2022	Fryderyki 2022	Artist of The Year	Nominated
