= List of number-one albums of 2023 (Poland) =

This is a list of number-one albums of 2023 in Poland, per the OLiS chart.

== Chart history ==
Issue date	Albums		Physical albums		Streaming albums		Ref.
Issue date	Album	Artist(s)	Album	Artist(s)	Album	Artist(s)	Ref.
January 5	Ogrody Mixtape 3	Kukon	—				
January 12	Złote przeboje	Kabe and Miszel	Złote przeboje	Kabe and Miszel	Rodzinny biznes	2115	
January 19	Sanah śpiewa poezyje	Sanah	Sanah śpiewa poezyje	Sanah	Rodzinny biznes	2115	
January 26	Sanah śpiewa poezyje	Sanah	Sanah śpiewa poezyje	Sanah	Rodzinny biznes	2115	
February 2	Na waszych oczach	Polska Wersja	Na waszych oczach	Polska Wersja	Lata dwudzieste	Dawid Podsiadło	
February 9	Na waszych oczach	Polska Wersja	Na waszych oczach	Polska Wersja	Lata dwudzieste	Dawid Podsiadło	
February 16	Na waszych oczach	Polska Wersja	Na waszych oczach	Polska Wersja	Lata dwudzieste	Dawid Podsiadło	
February 23	Leśna muzyka, (live czyli na żywo)	Dawid Podsiadło	Leśna muzyka, (live czyli na żywo)	Dawid Podsiadło	Lata dwudzieste	Dawid Podsiadło	
March 2	Lata dwudzieste	Dawid Podsiadło	Leśna muzyka, (live czyli na żywo)	Dawid Podsiadło	Lata dwudzieste	Dawid Podsiadło	
March 9	STYXXX	ReTo	44	KSU	STYXXX	ReTo	
March 16	3H: Hajp Hajs Hejt	Tede	3H: Hajp Hajs Hejt	Tede	STYXXX	ReTo	
March 23	club2020	club2020	club2020	club2020	club2020	club2020	
March 30	Pośród hien	Paluch and Słoń	Pośród hien	Paluch and Słoń	club2020	club2020	
April 6	Spokój	Kuban	Memento Mori	Depeche Mode	Spokój	Kuban	
April 13	Mały Książę	Avi	Mały Książę	Avi	Mały Książę	Avi	
April 20	Diaporama	O.S.T.R.	Diaporama	O.S.T.R.	Spokój	Kuban	
April 27	72 Seasons	Metallica	72 Seasons	Metallica	Spokój	Kuban	
May 4	D-Day	Agust D	D-Day	Agust D	Spokój	Kuban	
May 11	Newcomer	Białas	Newcomer	Białas	Spokój	Kuban	
May 18	−	Ed Sheeran	−	Ed Sheeran	Spokój	Kuban	
May 25	Kłamczuch	Floral Bugs	Kłamczuch	Floral Bugs	Spokój	Kuban	
June 1	I jest to możliwe mixtape	Dwa Sławy, Gruby Mielzky, Pers featuring The Returners	I jest to możliwe mixtape	Dwa Sławy, Gruby Mielzky, Pers featuring The Returners	Spokój	Kuban	
June 8	Ucieczka z kina wolność	Donguralesko	Ucieczka z kina wolność	Donguralesko	Spokój	Kuban	
June 15	5-Star	Stray Kids	5-Star	Stray Kids	Spokój	Kuban	
June 22	The Show	Niall Horan	The Show	Niall Horan	Lata dwudzieste	Dawid Podsiadło	
June 29	Złota kolekcja	Dżem	Złota kolekcja	Dżem	Lata dwudzieste	Dawid Podsiadło	
July 6	Pokolenie końca świata	Kacperczyk	Pokolenie końca świata	Kacperczyk	Pokolenie końca świata	Kacperczyk	
July 13	???	Zeamsone	???	Zeamsone	???	Zeamsone	
July 20	XLI	Kult	XLI	Kult	???	Zeamsone	
July 27	11:11	Fonos	11:11	Fonos	???	Zeamsone	
August 3	Uzumaki forma ostateczna	Szpaku and Kubi Producent	Uzumaki forma ostateczna	Szpaku and Kubi Producent	???	Zeamsone	
August 10	Uzumaki forma ostateczna	Szpaku and Kubi Producent	Uzumaki forma ostateczna	Szpaku and Kubi Producent	Utopia	Travis Scott	
August 17	Uzumaki forma ostateczna	Szpaku and Kubi Producent	Uzumaki forma ostateczna	Szpaku and Kubi Producent	Utopia	Travis Scott	
August 24	Hotel Maffija 3	SB Maffija	Hotel Maffija 3	SB Maffija	Utopia	Travis Scott	
August 31	Uzumaki forma ostateczna	Szpaku and Kubi Producent	Jack in the Box	J-Hope	???	Zeamsone	
September 7	Lata dwudzieste	Dawid Podsiadło	Lata dwudzieste	Dawid Podsiadło	Lata dwudzieste	Dawid Podsiadło	
September 14	Leśna muzyka, (live czyli na żywo)	Dawid Podsiadło	Leśna muzyka, (live czyli na żywo)	Dawid Podsiadło	Lata dwudzieste	Dawid Podsiadło	
September 21	<33	Mata	<33	Mata	<33	Mata	
September 28	Patocelebryta	Kizo	Patocelebryta	Kizo	Patocelebryta	Kizo	
October 5	1-800-Oświecenie	Taco Hemingway	1-800-Oświecenie	Taco Hemingway	1-800-Oświecenie	Taco Hemingway	
October 12	1-800-Oświecenie	Taco Hemingway	1-800-Oświecenie	Taco Hemingway	1-800-Oświecenie	Taco Hemingway	
October 19	1-800-Oświecenie	Taco Hemingway	1-800-Oświecenie	Taco Hemingway	1-800-Oświecenie	Taco Hemingway	
October 26	Pokaz slajdów	Kwiat Jabłoni	Pokaz slajdów	Kwiat Jabłoni	1-800-Oświecenie	Taco Hemingway	
November 2	Safe	Gibbs	Safe	Gibbs	Dziewczyna pop	Daria Zawiałow	
November 9	Tryb kreatywny	Palion	Tryb kreatywny	Palion	Safe	Gibbs	
November 16	Golden	Jungkook	Golden	Jungkook	Safe	Gibbs	
November 23	Rock-Star	Stray Kids	Rock-Star	Stray Kids	Safe	Gibbs	
November 30	PP	Pidżama Porno	PP	Pidżama Porno	Safe	Gibbs	
December 7	Męskie Granie 2023	Various artists	Męskie Granie 2023	Various artists	Safe	Gibbs	
December 14	PROXL3M	PRO8L3M	PROXL3M	PRO8L3M	PROXL3M	PRO8L3M	
December 21	Przed i po	Dawid Podsiadło	Przed i po	Dawid Podsiadło	PROXL3M	PRO8L3M	
December 28	XLI	Kult	XLI	Kult	PROXL3M	PRO8L3M	

== See also ==
- List of number-one singles of 2023 (Poland)
