= Maid Marian (disambiguation) =

Maid Marian is Robin Hood's love interest in the standard form of the legend as it emerged in the 16th century.

Maid Marian can also refer to:

- Maid Marian (novel), an 1822 novel by Thomas Love Peacock
- Maid Marian and Her Merry Men, a BBC television series
- Maid Marian (locomotive), a preserved steam locomotive
- Maid Marian Entertainment, a developer of browser-based video games
