= Jerzy Bralczyk =

Polish linguist (born 1947)

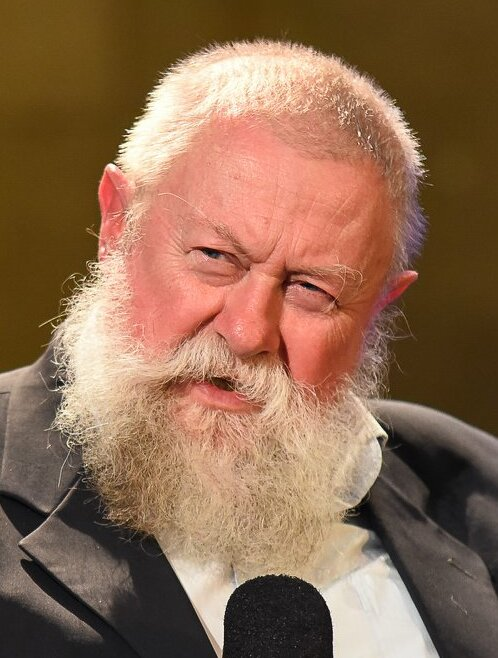
- Jerzy Bralczyk at the Copernicus Festival, 2019
- Born: 23 May 1947 (age 79); Ciechanów
- Citizenship: Polish
- Occupation: Linguist
- Website: bralczyk.com

Jerzy Bralczyk (born 23 May 1947) is a linguist.

== Biography ==
In 1969 he graduated with a degree in Polish philology from the University of Warsaw. In 1973 he obtained his doctorate. In 1986 he obtained habilitation. In 2000 he obtained title of professor. He has supervised five doctoral dissertations. He became a member of the Polish Language Council in 1996; was member of its presidium between 2003 and 2006 and was its vice-chairman from 2007 until at least 2021. He played himself in 2001 Wtorek (film). He was featured on Mata's track “Konkubinat”, released on the album 100 dni do matury (2020).

== Books ==
- O języku polskiej propagandy politycznej lat siedemdziesiątych. Warszawa. 1984.
- Przestrogi i porady językowe dla dziennikarzy. Warszawa. 1984.
- Język na sprzedaż. Warszawa. 1996.
- Mówi się. Porady językowe profesora Bralczyka. Warszawa. 2001.
- O języku polskiej polityki lat osiemdziesiątych i dziewięćdziesiątych. 2004.
- Leksykon zdań polskich. Warszawa. 2004.
- Mój język prywatny. Warszawa: Wydawnictwo Iskry. 2004.
- Leksykon nowych zdań polskich. Warszawa. 2005.
- Polak potrafi: przysłowia, hasła i inne polskie zdania osobne. Warszawa. 2006.
- 444 zdania polskie. Warszawa. 2007.
- Nowe słowa. Warszawa. 2007.
- O języku propagandy i polityki. Warszawa. 2007.
- Porzekadła na każdy dzień. Warszawa. 2008.
- Świat przez słowa. Warszawa. 2009.
- Słowo o słowie: porady językowe profesora Bralczyka. Warszawa. 2009.
- Mówi się: poradnik językowy profesora Bralczyka. Warszawa. 2009.
- ...Kiełbasa i sznurek. Warszawa. 2012. Co-authored with Michał Ogórek.
- Jeść. Olszanica: BoSz. 2014.

== Accolades ==
- Officer's Cross of the Order of Polonia Restituta (1997)
- Honorary Citizenship of Ciechanów (2023)
