= Oliwka Brazil =

Polish rapper and singer (born 2001)

- Born: Oliwia Bartosiewicz; 29 November 2001 (age 24); Marki, Poland
- Genre: Hip hop
- Occupations: Rapper, singer
- Years active: 2020–present
- Label: Warner Music Group

Oliwia Bartosiewicz (born 29 November 2001), known professionally as Oliwka Brazil, is a Polish rapper and singer. In 2021, she signed a contract with Warner Music Group. After a string of singles, she came out with her debut album, Oh My Gawd, in November 2024, working with Wiktor Wójcik.

Oliwka Brazil is listed alongside Young Leosia, among others, as a woman who is changing Polish hip-hop. In the lyrics of her songs, described as "vulgar," she speaks openly about sex, emphasizing that the character she creates has the urge for it and practices it on her own terms. In this way she breaks out of the existing pattern in Polish rap, in which women are often treated as trophies or humiliated "sluts". It is also emphasized that she writes lyrics, which so far in Polish rap have been written by men.

== Controversy ==
=== Vulgarity and cursing ===
Some media outlets have criticized Brazil because of the swearing in her songs and her vulgar image. "The underage youths shouting phrases about choking, spanking, spitting on a penis and swallowing semen looked cursory, and probably not all of them were aware of the words rapped from the stage in their direction." writes Mateusz Groen of the trojmiasto.pl portal about teenagers on Brazil's concerts. She is also often compared to "Polish Cardi B or Nicki Minaj".

=== Young Multi ===
When Brazil's first single, "Big Mommy," came out, Polish Twitch streamer and rapper Young Multi spoke positively about her work. However, when he criticized subsequent singles, Oliwka Brazil wrote on her stories on Instagram that Young Multi's work is "shit that never resembled music," and that he is a "boy that has unfulfilled dreams of being a rapper, and just sits in front of the computer and bitches something about my music." Multi on his evening livestream was quick to comment on the situation, "Oliwka Brazil, you fucking hypocrite, well, it so happens that when your first song came out and I recommended you, wasn't it you who inserted my statement on your Instastories? Is this in some other universe?" He later talked about how he earned his success on his own and had no "friend Smolasty" who immediately put him on a million-subscribed YouTube channel.

=== Bodyshaming ===
Brazil is also accused of bodyshaming and slutshaming skinny girls. In her song "Big Mommy," she raps that "escorts are skinny sluts and their nipples are like salami" and "you have XS bra, bitch, keep quiet."

== Discography ==
=== Albums ===
- Oh My Gawd (2024)

=== Singles ===
- Big Mommy (2020), POL: platinum
- Kokieterka (2021), POL: gold
- Karaluchy (2022)
- Mamacita (2022)
- Chcę Być Jak Oliwka Brazil (2022)
- S.E.K.S. (2022)

=== Featurings ===
- Smolasty – Playboy (2020)
- Smolasty – Oh Daddy (2020), POL: platinum
- Young Leosia – Stonerki (2021), POL: platinum
- Smolasty – Toxic Baby (2022)
- Kizo – To Jak (2022)

== Tours ==
- Big Mommy Tour (2022)
