= Solar (rapper) =

- Also known as: Solar, Słoneczny Solar, Bogaty Ziomek Tomba
- Born: Karol Poziemski; 29 October 1989 (age 36); Warsaw, Poland
- Genres: Hip-hop; freestyle rap
- Occupations: Rapper; singer
- Label: SBM Label

Karol Poziemski (born 29 October 1989), better known as Solar, Słoneczny Solar, and Bogaty Ziomek Tomba is a Polish rapper, freestyler. He is a two-time finalist of Wielka Bitwa Warszawska (freestyle battle; 2008, 2009), and the initiator of the Hot16Challenge and Hot16Challenge2 actions. Karol Poziemski is mostly known for his duet performances with Mateusz "Białas" Karas. He also conducts solo artistic activity.

== Private life ==
He has a son called Juliusz.

== Hot16Challenge ==
On 31 August 2014 the rapper launched the #Hot16Challenge campaign, an activity inspired by the Ice Bucket Challenge, however not motivated by altruism. The challenge consisted of recording a video in which the artist performs a so-called "sixteen" (a stanza consisting of 16 verses) to any beat, and then nominates other performers for the same task. The action was positively received by the hip-hop community, with the most popular Polish rappers joining in. The #Hot16Challenge was one of the most popular hashtags used in social media in 2014 in Poland.

The 8th edition of #Hot16Challenge2 began on 28 April 2020, with the goal of raising funds for medical personnel to support them in their fight against coronavirus, organized on siepomaga.pl. Each artist, apart from recording a 16-verse verse, was obliged to donate money for this purpose. As in the case of the first edition, the action reached a nationwide scale, involving both the hip-hop community, representatives of other music genres, as well as people not related to music. On 28 September 2020 the action was completed with the result of nearly 3.7 million PLN. The funds were used to purchase 208500 pairs of gloves, 62500 masks, 5740 visors, 4127 protective suits, 7 NOCOWALL disinfection devices and 7 ambulances.

== Discography ==
=== Solo albums ===
- Klub 27 (2017), OLiS: 14
- Pokój zero (2019), OLiS: 5

=== Collaborative albums ===
- Nad przepaścią (2010) (with MMX)
- Z ostatniej ławki (2011) (with Białas)
- Stage Diving (2013) (with Białas)
- #nowanormalnosc (2016) (with Białas); OLiS: 7, POL: gold

=== Notable singles ===
- "Intercontinental Bajers" (with Białas), POL: platinum
- "Nie dla ciebie" (with Białas, featuring Wac Toja), POL: platinum
- "Brudna prawda" (with Białas, featuring ReTo, Quebonafide, Wac Toja), POL: gold
- "Ostatni snap" (featuring Quebonafide), POL: gold
- "Zobaczymy" (featuring Kacperczyk, Mata, Jan-Rapowanie), POL: gold
- "Jestem zdrowy" (featuring Bedoes), POL: gold
