= 100 dni do matury =

Studio album by Mata
- Released: 18 January 2020
- Recorded: 2019–2020
- Genre: Hip-hop, trap
- Length: 66:51
- Label: SBM Label

Mata chronology
Fumar Mata (2018)	100 dni do matury (2020)	Młody Matczak (2021)

100 dni do matury (English: 100 Days until Matura) (Note: 100 dni do matury is a common title of Polish "countdown" refreshment course books for preparation to matura (final exams)) is the debut studio album by Polish rapper Mata. It was released on 18 January 2020 by the SBM Label. The album debuted at No. 1 on the Polish OLiS sales list, later achieving quadruple platinum, and diamond in June 2022.

The album was the most listened to album by a Polish artist on the streaming platform Spotify in 2020 and 5th in 2021, and the 10th most purchased album in Poland in 2020 and 27th in 2021.

== Single ==
As a promotion of the album, on January 16, 2020 a single was released with the titular song. In November 2020 it achieved the platinum single status.

== Reception ==
The album was described by reviewers as "a decent disc, with really good moments".

Music reviewers noted Mata's self-irony present in the lyrics, his "linguistic prowess", his "maturity in thinking about language", his "studious, at times demonstrably naive perspective", his "observational skills and naive sensitivity to the surrounding world", and his "good technique and wide interests, which can be heard in the backing tracks, stretched widely between the old and new schools of hip-hop". They pointed to Taco Hemingway's noticeable influence on the album.

== Track listing ==
All tracks are written by Michał Matczak.

No.	Title	Music	Length
1.	"Intro (do nauki)" (featuring Krzysztof Kowalewski, actor)	—	0:40
2.	"Biblioteka Trap"	Sujon Ahmed	3:35
3.	"Piszę to na matmie" (with Moo Latte)	Brian Massaka	4:17
4.	"Konkubinat" (featuring Jerzy Bralczyk, linguist)	Dallas Cooper	3:48
5.	"Homo ludens"	Bao Tran	3:21
6.	"Cafe PRL"	Kamil Łanka	3:28
7.	"Tango" (with DJ Flip)	Brian Young, Filip Dulewicz	3:13
8.	"Patointeligencja"	Sujon Ahmed	4:17
9.	"Hallelujah" (cover)	Leonard Cohen	1:35
10.	"Żółte flamastry i grube katechetki"	Noah Stephen Kruse	4:16
11.	"Mata Montana"	Tash Beats	3:22
12.	"Lezore"	Bao Tran	4:16
13.	"Wino Sangrita (s01e01)"	Jakub Cichoń	4:55
14.	"Nero"	Bailey Daniel	3:18
15.	"Gombao 33" (featuring Wyguś, Szczepan and Adam)	Otrax	5:40
16.	"100 dni do matury"	Smoothboi Ezra (sample from Thinking of You), Jeremy Fedryk, Marcin "mrBelt" Pasek, Sarcastic Sounds, Szymon Łuniewski	5:02
17.	"Schodki"	Brian Young	3:56
18.	"Prawy do Lewego"	Brian Young	3:50
Total length:			66:51

== Awards and nominations ==
Awards and nominations for 100 dni do matury
Year	Category	Award	Results
2020	Most popular albums in Poland	Statystyki Spotify 2020	Won
2021	Record of the Year	Popkillery 2021	Won
2021	Album of the Year (assembly)	Popkillery 2021	Nominated
2021	Album of the Year (viewers)	Popkillery 2021	Won
2021	Hip-hop Album of the Year	Fryderyki 2021	Won
2021	Album of the Year	Lech Polish Hip-Hop Music Awards	Nominated
2021	Debut of the Year	Lech Polish Hip-Hop Music Awards	Won
2021	Most popular albums in Poland	Statystyki Spotify 2021	5th place

== Charts ==
Chart (2020)	Peak position
Polish Albums (OLiS)	1
