= Tiger Energy Drink =

Energy drink

- Type: Energy drink
- Manufacturer: Maspex
- Distributor: Maspex
- Origin: Poland
- Introduced: 2003
- Website: Tiger Energy Drink Official Website

Tiger is an energy drink, produced by Polish company Maspex.

== Facts ==
Tiger has been branded with a nickname of Polish boxer Dariusz 'Tiger' Michalczewski and promoted with the slogan: "Power is back!” The boxer granted license for the drink's manufacturing, distribution and promotion to Maspex company in 2010. The old manufacturer has been forbidden by Polish courts to refer to the brand in any manner.

Tiger Energy Drink debuted first on the Polish market in 2003. From the outset, the brand featured Dariusz "Tiger" Michalczewski, who starred in the drink's first television commercial, among other roles. Initially, production was handled by Gellwe (currently operating under the name FoodCare).

In 2006, the brand refreshed its logo and changed its advertising slogan to "Power is back."

In 2007, Tiger surpassed Red Bull in sales, thus becoming the leader in the Polish energy drink market.

In 2010, Dariusz Michalczewski, aka "Tiger," and the Darek Michalczewski "Equal Opportunities" Foundation decided to terminate their contract with FoodCare and license the production, distribution, and promotion of the drink under the Tiger brand to companies within the Maspex Group.

In spring 2019, Tiger Energy Drink made a song called "TA TA TIGER" to promote the drink.

In 2019, the Tiger Energy Drink brand received a Golden Effie in the non-alcoholic beverages category for its "Champions" campaign.

In January 2020, Tiger Energy Drink officially debuted in the Czech Republic. At that time, the Polish group Maspex expanded its licensing agreement and introduced the drink to the Czech, Slovak, and Baltic markets. The drink is still available for sale there.

In 2020, the "CHAMPION TIGER ROAST" campaign earned the brand a Silver Effie in the non-alcoholic beverages category. A year later, Tiger won another Silver Effie for its Tiger ROAST campaign in the Young Audience category.

In summer 2022, the Tiger Trip (often promoted as Tiger Trip 2K22) took place. It was a project that combined narrative marketing and influencer marketing. As part of the campaign, a dedicated "#ekipętigera" was created (including Maryanne Duda) and in April 2022 Tiger collaborated with Young Leosia on a song called "Rok Tygrysa" (The Year of the Tiger), in which the artist encourages people to follow their own path, and Tiger cans appear in many shots.

From January 2026, Tiger Energy Drink was included in the deposit system by the Ministry of Climate and Environment for ecological reasons until the liquidation of the deposit system in Poland

In July and August 2026, the Tiger Energy Drink brand, in cooperation with CANPACK, changed all energy drinks to a new look that is supposed to look more premium and break with the image of a "cheap drink".

Tiger is being exported to several countries in the world, including the UK and the US.

== Ingredients ==
Tiger is rich in B vitamins, taurine and caffeine (32 mg/100ml).

=== List of ingredients ===
- Water
- Sugar
- Acidity regulators: Citric acid and sodium citrate
- Carbon dioxide
- Taurine (0.4%)
- Erythritol (only for the zero versions)
- Flavouring
- Caffeine (0.03%)
- Inositol (0.02%)
- Colours: E 150d
- Riboflavin
- Enriching substances: Vitamins (niacin, panthotenic acid, vitamin B_{6}, vitamin B_{12})

Functional versions, such as those in the previously discontinued Tiger Energy Drink Mental, Restart, Fighter, Speed, and Vitamin Attack, also contain:

- vitamins C and D
- guarana
- magnesium
- potassium
- folic acid
- biotin
- pantothenic acid
- BCAA
- fruit juices

(*) – % of the recommended daily intake.

==== Nutrition value in 100ml ====
Energy: 195kL / 46kcal

- Protein: 0g
- Carbohydrate: 4.9g of which sugar: 4.9g
- Fat: 0g of which saturated fatty acids: 0g
- Fibre: 0g
- Sodium: 0.1g
- Vitamins: Niacin 7.9 mg (44%*), panthotenic acid 1.98 mg (44%*), vitamin B_{6} 2.0 mg (100%*), vitamin B_{12} 0.2μg (20%*).

(*) - % of recommended daily allowance (RDA).

Drink is marketed to sportsmen, and people during increased physical performance or mental effort.

== Packaging ==

=== Cans ===
- Tiger 250 ml & 500 ml
- Tiger Zero 250 ml & 500ml
- Tiger 4 x 250 ml pack
- Tiger Wild Strawberry Zero & Strawberry (with sugar)
- Tiger Peach Zero 500ml
- Tiger Peach Zero 250ml
- Tiger Cherry (there is a version with zero sugar)
- Tiger Mojito (there is a version with zero sugar)
- Tiger Placebo & Placebo Zero
- Tiger Kiwi & Lime Zero 500ml
- Tiger Blueberry Zero 500ml
- Tiger Max & Max Mango 250ml (this variation has 50% more caffeine than the standard 250ml can)

=== Bottles ===
- Tiger Energy & Energy Zero with glass bottle 330ml
- Tiger Red & Blue 330ml
- Tiger Energy Shot (small version of 150ml can, with same amount of taurine, vitamins etc.)

=== Other ===
- Tiger Juicy Line (a.k.a Easy Boost) 500ml (Blueberry, Cactus, Watermelon, Bubble Gum, Grape and Mirabelle)
