= Bambi (rapper) =

Polish rapper (born 2003)

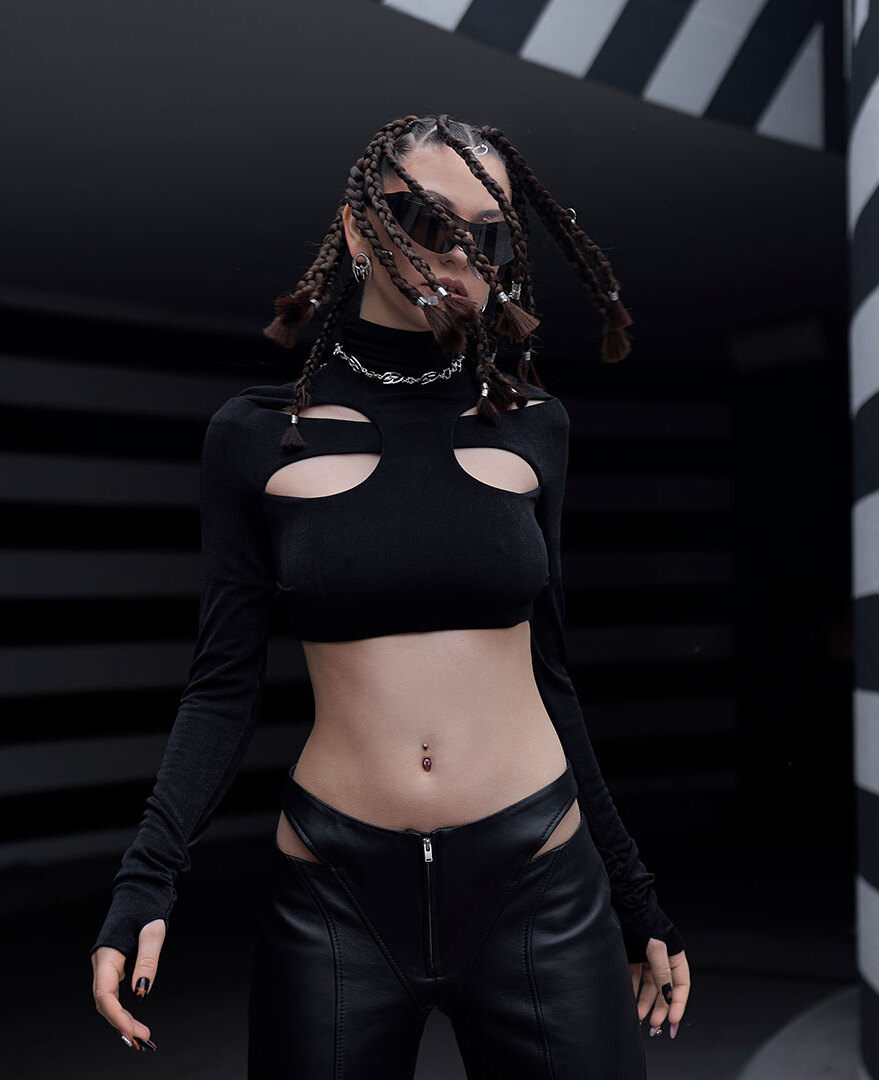
- Bambi in 2023
- Born: Michalina Włodarczyk; 28 October 2003 (age 22); Poznań, Poland
- Citizenship: Polish
- Occupations: Rapper; songwriter
- Years active: 2020–present

Michalina Włodarczyk (born 28 October 2003), known professionally as Bambi (stylised in lowercase), is a Polish rapper and songwriter.

== Musical career ==
In 2018, Bambi appeared in the blind auditions for the inaugural season of The Voice Kids with the song "Sweet Creature" by Harry Styles. The song's performance resulted in 3 coaches' seats being turned around. She was invited to the teams of Tomson and Baron, Dawid Kwiatkowski and Edyta Górniak. Bambi chose Tomson and Baron. She did not make it to the live episodes, having been eliminated at the battle stage.

In 2021, Bambi appeared in the 4th edition of SBM Starter, an SBM Label initiative promoting young rap talents. She presented three songs, "Handpoke", "Bletki" and "chrypki głos nie od fajek".

On 1 January 2023, Bambi signed a contract with Bailla Ella Records, which is owned by Young Leosia. On 10 February, she released her first full-fledged single under the BE banner entitled "IRL", which topped the Polish charts, resulting in a gold certificate 3 months after the premiere. On 17 May, she presented her second single "Millie Walky". On 4 August, she presented her third single "Latawce". On 25 August, she presented her fourth single "BFF" featuring Young Leosia.

== Discography ==
=== Studio albums ===
Year	Details	Peak chart positions	Certification	Sales
Year	Details	POL	Certification	Sales
2023	in real life: Released: 17 November 2023; Label: BE Records; Format: CD, digital download, streaming	3	POL: 2× Platinum	POL: 60,000+
2025	Trap or Die: Released: 6 February 2025; Label: BE Records; Format: CD, digital download, streaming	1	POL: Platinum	POL: 30,000+
2026	B: Released: 16 October 2026; Label: self, Universal Music Poland; Format: CD, digital download, streaming	Upcoming		

=== EP ===
Year	Details	Peak chart positions	Certification	Sales
Year	Details	POL	Certification	Sales
2024	PG$ (with Young Leosia): Wydany: 7 March 2024; Wytwórnia: BE Records; Format: CD, digital download, streaming	2	POL: 3× Platunum	POL: 90,000+

=== Singles ===
==== As lead artist ====
Year	Title	Certification	Sales	Album
2021	„Handpoke”			^{_}
2021	"Bletki"			^{_}
2021	"Chrypki głos nie od fajek"			^{_}
2023	"IRL"	POL: 3× Platinum	POL: 150,000+	in real life
2023	"Millie Walky"	POL: 4× Platinum	POL: 200,000+	in real life
2023	"Latawce"	POL: Gold	POL: 25,000	in real life
2023	"BFF" (featuring Young Leosia)	POL: Diamond	POL: 250,000+	PG$
2023	"Big Big Girl / Karate Kid"			in real life
2023	"Skippers" (featuring Young Leosia, Janusz Walczuk, Waima)	POL: Gold	POL: 25,000	^{_}
2023	"Icon"			^{_}
2024	"Madonna"	POL: Platinum	POL: 50,000+	Trap or Die
2024	"Need U"			^{_}
2024	"Czemu nie śpisz?"	POL: Platinum	POL: 50,000+	Trap or Die
2024	"Dobra robota" (featuring Young Leosia, Janusz Walczuk, Waima)			^{_}
2025	"Widziałam już wszystko" (with francis)			^{_}
2026	"Let it B"			B
2026	"Warto kłamac"			B
2026	"Gorset"			B
2026	"CYRK" (featuring Bedoes 2115)			B
2026	"Entry of the B"			B
2026	"Piaskownica"			B
2026	"After" (featuring Guzior)			B
2026	"VIS A VIS"			B
2026	"B OPERA"			B
2026	"Myślę Więc Jestem"			B
2026	"Jaram Blanta a za Oknem Pge"			B
2026	"Fashion Week"			B
2026	"Herrera"			B
2026	"Gdzie Jesteś"			B
2026	"Gasnę" (featuring Suumoo)			B
2026	"Wróć Do Mnie"			B

==== As featured artist ====
Year	Single	Album
2023	"Bad Bunny" (SB Maffija; featuring bambi and Flory)	Hotel Maffija 3
2023	"Patrick Swayze" (SB Maffija; featuring Slowez, WoLa, Szczepan, Tadeo, and bambi)	Hotel Maffija 3
2023	"Zamki na piasku" (SB Maffija; featuring bambi)	Hotel Maffija 3
2023	"Letniak" (Łatwogang; featuring bambi)	singel niealbumowy
2023	"Chwile" (Waima; featuring bambi and LuKs)	Cameleo
2025	"1Day in LA" (francis; featuring bambi and Oki)	^{_}

== Awards and nominations ==
Year	Award	Category	Nominee/work	Result	Ref.
2024	Popkillery 2024	Rapper of the Year	Bambi	Won	
2024	Popkillery 2024	Discovery of the Year	Bambi	Won	
2024	Popkillery 2024	Single of the Year	"BFF"	Nominated	
2024	Popkillery 2024	Trendsetter of the Year	Bambi	Nominated	
2024	Popkillery 2024	Newschool Album of the Year	In Real Life	Nominated	
