= SBM Label =

Polish hip-hop label

- Founded: 2016; 10 years ago
- Founder: Solar, Białas
- Genre: hip-hop; trap; rap
- Location: Warsaw, Poland
- Official website: sbmlabel.pl

SBM Label is a Polish hip-hop label based in Warsaw, Poland, until 2018 operating under the name SB Maffija Label. The label's contracted artists include rappers Solar, Białas, Beteo, Jan-Rapowanie, Mata, Adi Nowak, Kinny Zimmer, Fukaj, Janusz Walczuk and Lanek, the band Kacperczyk, and music producers Lanek and DJ Johny. Former SBM Label members included: ADM, Neile, the duo Avi & Louis Villain, Got Barss, Wiatr, Nowak vel Nowaczyński, Deemz, Nocny, Zui, Moli, White 2115 and Bedoes (he is now involved with his own label 2115 Gang).

The founders of the label are rappers Solar and Białas. The first album released on the label is Z ostatniej ławki by Solar and Białas.

== History ==
In 2008, the duo Solar/Bialas started their activity, around which soon formed the hip-hop crew SB Maffija, which included: Solar, Białas, King TomB, Quebonafide, ADM, Beteo, Neile, Danny, Hary, Blejk, Żabson, Bonson, Koldi, Lanek, Dj Johny, Got Barss, Deys, Foux, Wiciu, Pejot, Trzy-Sześć and MMX. After ending their collaboration with Prosto Label and Step Records, the rappers launched their own label in 2016 under the name SB Maffija Label, simultaneously announcing the addition of their first two artists, Beteo and Bedoes and after some time ADM and Neile were also contracted. In 2018, the label changed its name from SB Maffija Label to SBM Label.

In June 2020, an initiative was born where artists affiliated with the label stayed together in a hotel in Kashubia to create the first collaborative album entirely of the collective, Hotel Maffija, which was released on June 6.

== Albums ==
Date	Artist(s)	Title	Certifications	OLiS	Awards
September 1, 2011	Solar, Białas	Z ostatniej ławki			
April 29, 2016	Beteo	Jeden Jedyny			
August 26, 2016	Neile	Kicktape 2.0			
August 27, 2016	Białas	H8M4	platinum	1	
November 25, 2016	ADM	Hellboy			
November 25, 2016	Solar, Białas	#nowanormalnosc			
February 17, 2017	Bedoes, Kubi Producent	Aby śmierć miała znaczenie	gold	1	
May 26, 2017	Beteo	Bejbi			
September 15, 2017	Białas, Lanek	POLON			
November 10, 2017	Wiatr	Mati Wiatr			
December 8, 2017	Solar	Klub 27			
May 28, 2018	Jan-Rapowanie, Nocny	NOCNA ZMjANA			
August 31, 2018	White 2115	Rockstar			
September 26, 2018	Białas, Lanek	HYPER2000			
October 26, 2018	Beteo	NOWY POP			
November 30, 2018	Bedoes, Kubi Producent	Kwiat polskiej młodzieży	3× platinum		
March 15, 2019	Jan-Rapowanie, Nocny	Plansze			
July 19, 2019	Nowak vel Nowaczyński, Nocny	Sztuki wizualne			
September 20, 2019	Solar	Pokój Zero			
October 25, 2019	White 2115	Młody Książę			
November 29, 2019	Bedoes, Lanek	Opowieści z Doliny Smoków	diamond		
January 17, 2020	Mata	100 dni do matury	diamond		
February 14, 2020	Kacperczyk	Sztuki Piękne			
February 25, 2020	Jan-Rapowanie, Nocny	Uśmiech			
June 6, 2020	SB Maffija	Hotel Maffija	platinum		
August 5, 2020	Białas	H8M5			
August 28, 2020	White 2115	Rockstar: Do zachodu słońca			
October 30, 2020	Beteo	Hoodie			
January 15, 2021	Bedoes, Lanek (with 2115 Gang)	Rewolucja romantyczna	gold		
April 16, 2021	Moli	Jak spadały gwiazdy			
April 30, 2021	Janusz Walczuk	Janusz Walczuk		1	
May 7, 2021	Białas, White 2115	Diamentowy Las		2	
June 9, 2021	Fukaj, Kubi Producent	Chaos		4	
October 1, 2021	Mata	Młody Matczak	diamond	1	Statystyki Spotify 2021 – won; Bestsellery Empiku Muzyka rap & hip-hop – won; Bestsellery Empiku Nagroda Publiczności – won
November 12, 2021	Adi Nowak	Ognisko Niedomowe			
November 26, 2021	Kacperczyk	Kryzys Wieku Wczesnego	gold		
February 18, 2022	SB Maffija	Hotel Maffija 2	platinum		
March 11, 2022	Jan-Rapowanie	Bufor	gold		
April 8, 2022	Lanek (as Kamil Lanek)	EXTRAVAGANZA			
May 12, 2022	Kinny Zimmer	Letnisko	gold	15	
June 24, 2022	White 2115	Pretty Boy	gold		
April 21, 2023	Dorota Masłowska	Wolne			
April 28, 2023	Białas	Newcomer	platinum		
June 23, 2023	Kacperczyk	Pokolenie końca świata	gold	1	
July 21, 2023	Fukaj	PRELUDIUM	platinum		
August 2, 2023	SB Maffija	Hotel Maffija 3	2× platinum		
September 8, 2023	Mata	<33		1	
April 4, 2024	Jacuś	Fantasmagorie			
