= Kinny Zimmer =

- Born: Wiktor Jakowski; 18 July 1999 (age 27)
- Genres: Hip-hop; trap
- Occupations: Rapper, singer, songwriter, producer
- Years active: 2019–present
- Labels: SBM Label, GUGU

Wiktor Jakowski (born 18 July 1999), better known by the stage name Kinny Zimmer, is a Polish rapper, singer, songwriter and producer.

== Career ==
On 3 June 2019 Jakowski released his first album Aksonometria, which he produced himself. Later he released two EP's, Oko Ptaka Z Góry Patrzące on 17 July 2019, and Achhh on 20 March 2020. He also produced them both. They are not longer available on streaming services.

On 10 July 2020 Kinny joined rapper Szpaku's label GUGU. He announced the album SADBOY, CHŁOPAK Z SADU and released three singles, "IKEA", "Po Jabłkach", and "Jadę Nocą Na Mazurach". On 6 December 2020 he left the label, thus abandoning the concept of the announced album.

On 15 September 2021 the artist participated in the SBM Starter campaign, which aims to promote young rap talent. He presented himself in it with the single "Jazda". Later he released the single "Rozmazana kreska", which went viral on the app TikTok, spawning almost 30 million views on the app. The music video was released on 17 November 2021, and has over 22 million views on YouTube.

On 7 January 2022 he released a song "Benz-Dealer" featuring Quebonafide, becoming a new member of the SBM Label.

In 2022 he was featured on the singles "Powiemy Ci To W Twarz", "Zemsta Dzikusa", both by Lanek, and "LAXJFK" by Jan-Rapowanie. He also was featured on SBM Label's album Hotel Maffija 2. The album is certified platinum.

On 12 April 2022 Jakowski released the single "Dziecko" and announced his album Letnisko. The album was released on 13 May 2022. It reached number 15 on an official Polish sales list (OLiS) and is certified gold.

On 23 June 2022 White 2115's single "Pierwszy raz" featuring Kinny Zimmer was released.

== Discography ==
=== Albums ===
- Aksonometria (2019)
- Hotel Maffija 2 (with SBM Label) (2022), POL: diamond
- Letnisko (2022), POL: gold

=== EPs ===
- Oko Ptaka Z Góry Patrzące (2019)
- Achhh (2020)
