= Young Multi =

Polish rapper (born 1997)

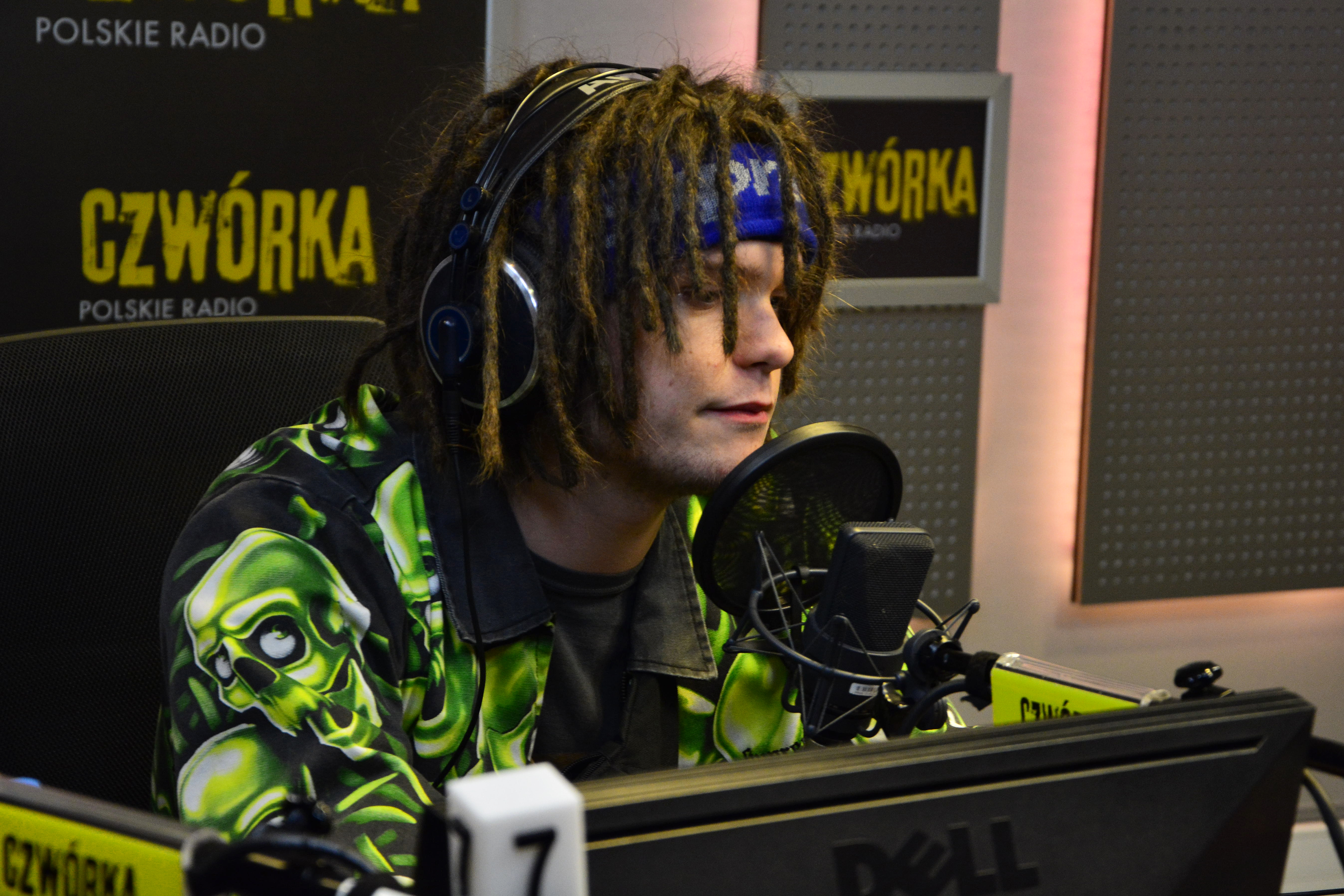

Background information
- Born: Michał Rychlik; 1 February 1997 (age 29); Głubczyce, Poland

Michał Rychlik, known as Young Multi (born 1 February 1997), is a Polish trap artist, songwriter, and founder of Young Family Label (YFL). On 1 December 2017, he released his first album, Nowa fala, which reached number one on the OLiS chart. His second album, Trapstar, premiered in November 2018. In late 2019, in collaboration with producer Fast Life Sharky, he released the EP Trap After Death, limited to 5,000 copies, available exclusively on the rapper's website. His fourth album, Toxic, was released on 17 December 2021.

== Biography and career ==
=== YouTube (2010-2017) ===
On 10 September 2010, Michał Rychlik launched his first YouTube channel under the pseudonym "MultiGameplayGuy," where he spent most of his career commentating on video game gameplay. His first video, "Sherwood Dungeon Gameplay - Commentary," was released on 17 October. After embarking on a more serious music career, he distanced himself from his past and kept most of his videos private. However, over time, his most popular productions were restored or re-released during his live streams.

In April 2015, Multi co-founded the group ABG (Angel Boyz Gang), with which he released his first music video for "Nie Wiem" on 21 August, generating nearly 19 million views to date. In 2016, he released music videos for the songs "Stop" and "Tяon," and ended the year with the single "Nowa Fala", announcing his debut solo album. In April 2017, he released the song "Plotki," and in July, he finally distanced himself from YouTube, symbolically marking his retirement by changing his hairstyle to dreadlocks. That same month, he released the song "Więcej" and the track "Kimś,". Multi's growing popularity as a rapper was accompanied by considerable controversy, which intensified after the release of the single "Plecak" (Backpack) on 25 August 2017 – the song became his biggest hit, garnering 40 million views to date.

=== After 2018 ===
In April 2018, Multi announced its first concert tour, "Nowa Fala Tour," in collaboration with LG. The event took place between 11 May and 22 June, spanning seven Polish cities.

In October 2018, the artist announced his second studio album, "Trapstar." Michał promised it would be more mature and focused on motivational content, but it would also feature party tracks. Pre-orders for the album launched on 16 October, alongside the premiere of the music video for the first single, "Skrzydła."

On 18 October 2019, Michał revealed details about his third studio release – the mini-album *Trap After Death*, recorded in collaboration with producer Fast Life Sharky. Pre-sales for the EP, limited to 5,000 copies, began on 20 October, alongside the release of the album's first single. The album, characterized by a powerful, live sound reminiscent of earlier tracks "Trap" and "Trap II," premiered on December 6 and debuted at number 4 on the weekly OLiS chart.

The "Trap After Death Tour," the culmination of the mini-album, was scheduled to take place in seven Polish cities in the spring of 2020. However, due to the COVID-19 pandemic, the event was postponed until the fall and ultimately took place at the turn of September and October 2020.

In January 2021, Multi began livestreaming on Twitch, which quickly gained immense popularity. Snippets of these streams, posted on his secondary YouTube channel, now reach millions of views.

Between October 2022 and January 2023, the "Toxic Tour" concert tour took place in 10 Polish cities (including Szczecin, Poznań, Kraków, Lublin, Łódź, Warsaw, Katowice, Toruń and Białystok).

== Awards and nominations ==
On 12 April 2023, Young Multi was awarded the Audience Award in the "Best Fan Contact" category at the Popkillery 2023 gala. He repeated this success on 24 April 2025, when he again received the Audience Award in the same category during the seventh edition of this plebiscite.

Year	Awards	Category	Result	Ref.
2023	Popkillery	Best Fan Contact	Won	
2025	Popkillery	Best Fan Contact	Won	
2026	The Streamer Awards	Best International Streamer	Pending	

=== Złote Antosie ===
Year	Awards	Category	Result	Ref.
2023	Złote Antosie	Streamer of the Year	Lost	
2023	Złote Antosie	Stream of the Year	Lost	
2023	Złote Antosie	Drama of the Year	Lost	
2024	Złote Antosie	Streamer of the Year	Lost	
2024	Złote Antosie	Best Player ("Best Clips Streamer")	Won	
2025	Złote Antosie	Streamer of the Year	Won	
2025	Złote Antosie	Best Just Chatting Streamer	Won	
2025	Złote Antosie	Project of the Year	Won	
2025	Złote Antosie	Short Shot	Won	
2025	Złote Antosie	Rage of the Year	Lost	
