= Smolasty =

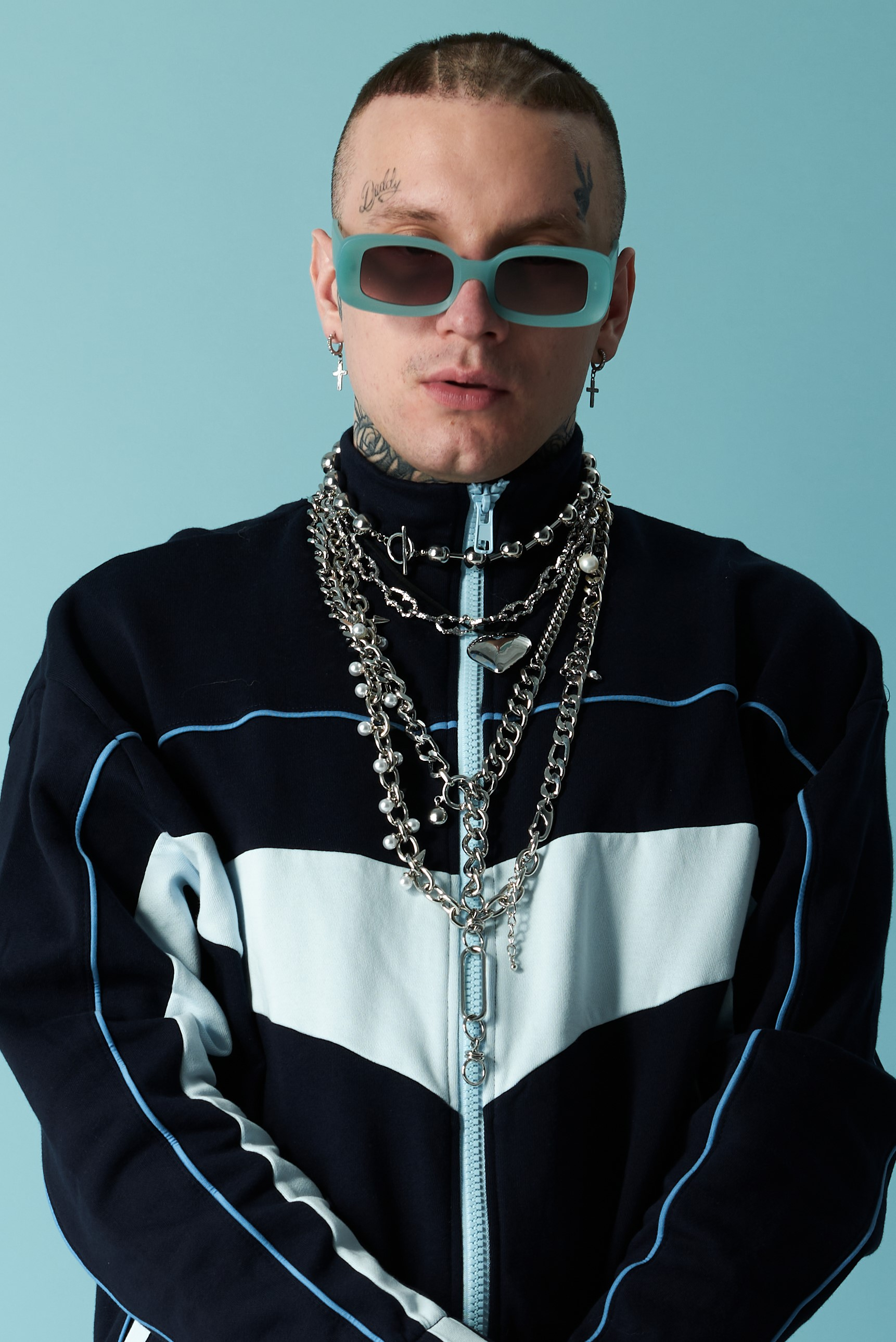
- Smolasty (2023)

Background information
- Born: Norbert Smoliński; 27 August 1995 (age 31); Warsaw, Poland
- Genres: Hip hop, pop, R&B
- Occupations: Rapper, singer, record producer
- Instruments: Guitar, piano
- Years active: 2014–present
- Label: Warner Music Poland
- Website: http://www.smolasty.com/

Norbert Smoliński (born 27 August 1995), known professionally as Smolasty, is a Polish rapper, singer and record producer, who creates R&B, pop, and rap music.

He has collaborated with performers such as: Ewa Farna, Kaz Bałagane, Otsochodzi, Białas, MIYO, Robert Gawliński, Malik Montana, ReTo, Chada, PlanBe, Young Multi, Mr. Polska, Oliwka Brazil or Frosti Regge.

== Music career ==
As a teenager, he was interested in rap and funk music, and founded a funk band in which he played guitar, among other things. He attended elementary school, middle school and high school in the Warsaw district of Bródno. In later years, he began to be inspired by the music of the 60s and 70s, as well as the work of artists such as Chris Brown and Omarion. He co-produced and co-wrote music for Kaz Balagane's 2015 mini-album Lot022.

In late 2014 he made his debut on the track "21 Pesos" on Pablo Novacci's album, Galactico, and in 2016 he made a guest appearance on the single "Znowu nie ma jej" recorded with production duo MXF.

In April 2016, he released his debut mixtape, titled Mr Hennessy. In July, he released his new single - "Jestem, byłem, będę". In early 2017, he became one of the members of the production project Młode Wilki Popkillera 5. With the team, he recorded and released a studio album entitled Popkiller Młode Wilki 5, which was promoted by, among others, the single "Dla nas" produced by him. The music video for the song, published in March, received over 18 million views on YouTube. At the end of March 2017, he released a solo EP entitled Jestem, byłem, będę. In July 2017, he released a mixtape titled Los, promoted by the single "Nie pierwszy raz".

In March 2018, he was nominated for the Fryderyk Music Award in the Phonographic Debut of the Year category. The singles "Uzależniony" and "Fake Love" were previews of the album, which was released on 7 September 2018. The album reached number 7 on the list of fifty best-selling albums in Poland. In February 2019, he picked up a gold record for album sales.

== Discography ==
=== Studio albums ===
- Fake Love (2018)
- Pełnia (2020)
- Ghetto Playboy (2021)

=== EPs ===
- Lot022 (2015; with Kaz Bałagane)
- Jestem, byłem, będę (2017)

=== Mixtapes ===
- Mr Hennessy (2016)
- Los (2017)

=== Guest appearance ===
- Popkiller Młode Wilki 5 (2017; with Młode Wilki Popkillera 5)
