= Mata (rapper) =

Polish rapper

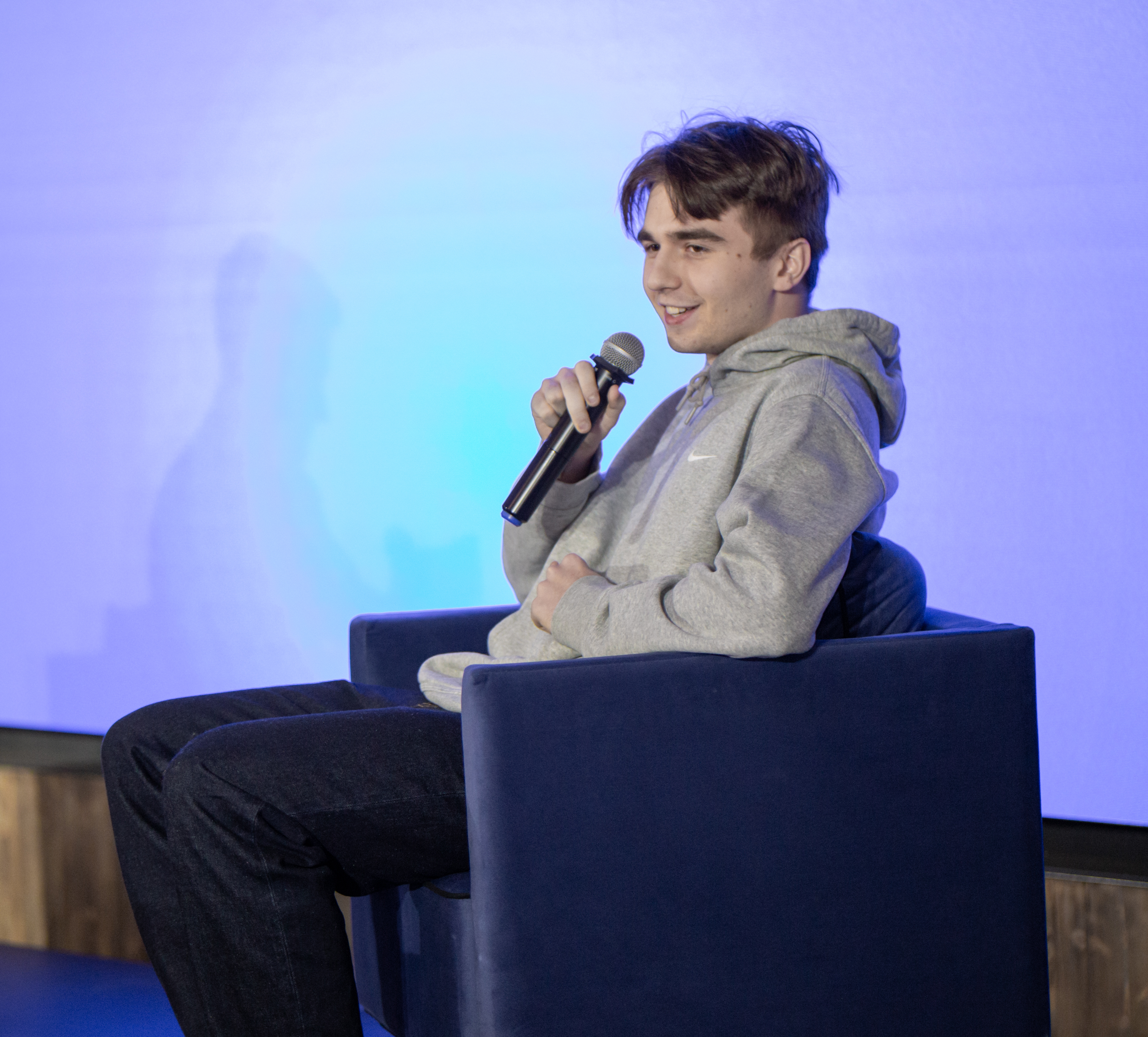
- Mata in 2020
- Born: Michał Matczak; 14 July 2000 (age 26); Wrocław, Poland
- Education: Stefan Batory Lyceum in Warsaw
- Occupations: Rapper; singer; songwriter
- Years active: 2019–present
- Musical career
- Genres: Pop; Hip-hop; electronic

Michał Matczak (born 14 July 2000 in Wrocław), known professionally as Mata, Młody Matczak or Skute Bobo (Stoned Baby), is a Polish rapper, singer and songwriter.

== Early life ==
He is the son of Marcin Matczak, a law professor and Arletta Śliwińska-Matczak, who runs an English language school, both from Sława. In 2019, he passed the international high school diploma at the Stefan Batory High School in Warsaw. During the exams, he presented, inter alia, essay titled "Evolution of language in Polish hip-hop in 2001–2014 based on the work of Jacek Graniecki "Tede"". He received the award of the Varsovian of the Year 2019 in the Warszawiaki plebiscite. The creator of his artistic pseudonym was his father, who invented it during their joint holidays in 2012. He supported his son in entering the music market and advised on the creation of the first song "Klubowe". During an interview on television in 2024, he declared to be on the Autism spectrum.

== Music career ==
=== 2018–2020: Debut ===
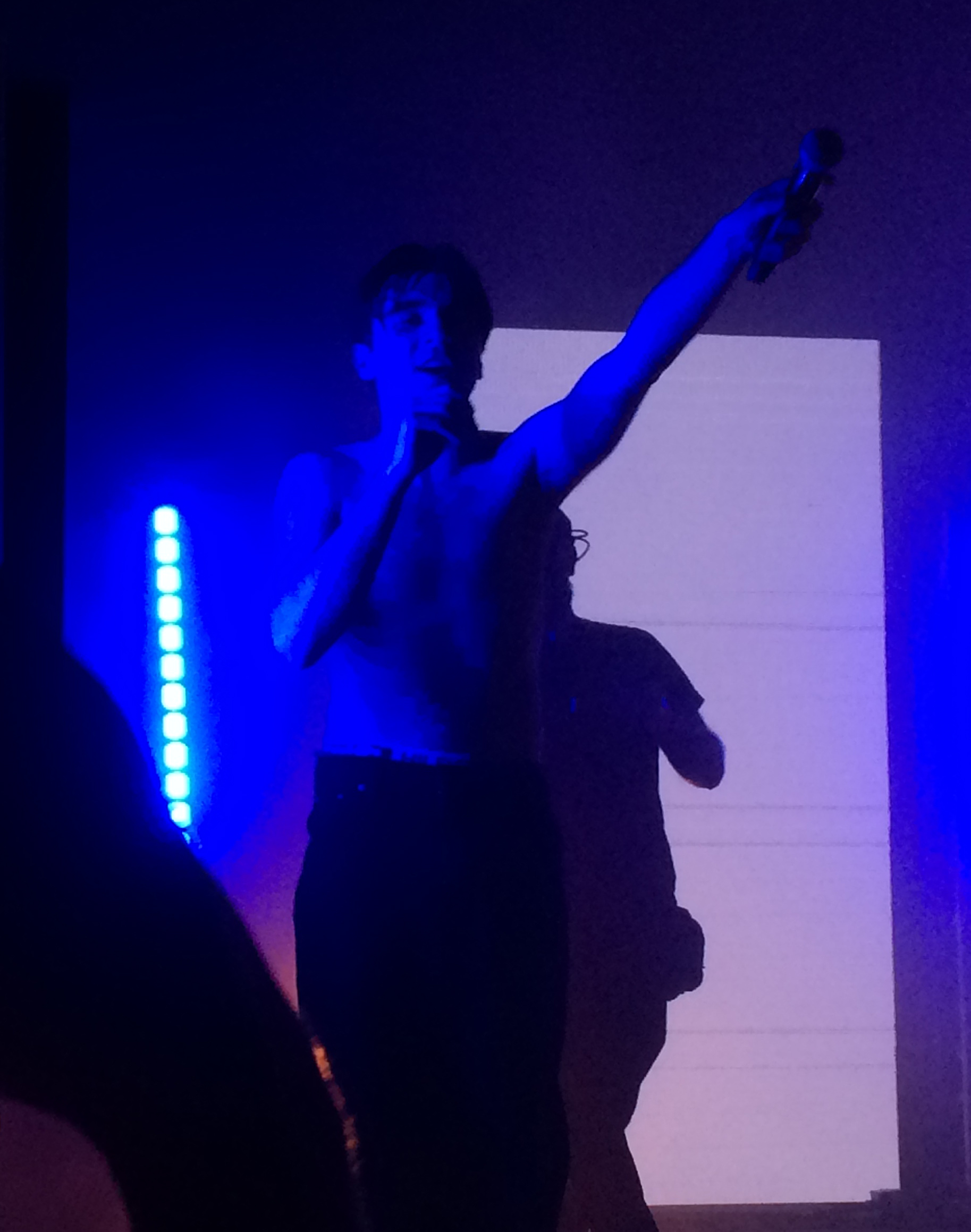
Mata in Studio Kraków Club, 2020

In October 2018, he released the concept album Fumar Mata, which was then also released in April 2019 as a mini-album. His breakthrough came with the single "Biblioteka Trap" released on 15 April 2019. On 11 December 2019, the music video for his single "Patointeligencja" was published on YouTube via SBM Label record company. Within a few days, the song was listened to almost 10 million times. The content of the song was commented on in the nationwide media, mainly due to the notably explicit lyrics, describing the behaviour of children and young people of affluent background, incl. the use of psychoactive substances, including hard drugs and addiction to them; consumption of alcohol at school, including in class; suicide, unplanned teenage pregnancy and sexual paraphilia. The track caused controversy, meeting with criticism, among others management of Batory High School due to the use of the school image in the music video for the song. In turn, the Alumni Association, in the issued statement, drew attention to the positive aspect of starting a discussion around an important problem in reaction to the work of one of the high school graduates. Mata was appreciated by placing his work in the playlist and on the cover of Tidal Rising Global.

A few days after the publication "Patointeligencja" was used by journalists of the state-owned Polish Television to criticize Polish judges (also Marcin Matczak, the rapper's father, denouncing the government and supporting the judges side in the 2015 Polish Constitutional Court crisis and in the ongoing Polish Supreme Court Crisis) in the reportage titled "Rebellion of the judicial caste" by Konrad Wąż, aired on 15 December 2019 in the main evening edition of Wiadomości, Poland's chief news program.

On 18 January 2020, Mata released his debut studio album 100 dni do matury, which was certified diamond. The album was met with mixed-to-positive reviews, being reviewed as "decent, with really good moments" and "a successful debut"; although it was also met with less enthusiastic reviews. Critics pointed to the noticeable influence of Taco Hemingway. In September 2020, he received four statuettes in the hip-hop industry competition Popkillery in categories "Discovery of the year" and "Single of the year". The song "100 dni do matury" was the most listened to single on TIDAL in Poland in 2020, while the album reached number two in the album chart.

=== 2021: Młody Matczak and Skute Bobo ===
The lyrics that caused the most controversy:

"The PiS media would like to take care of Mata-senior / He's a holy man / And what I do – it's my choice / And I'll answer for it myself one day / But first I'll answer you, so listen carefully / Fuck Polish Television / Jacek Kurski – suck my dick / (Stop stalking my family, you whore) / Because I'd like to grow up in peace."

— Mata rapping on his single "Patoreakcja".

On 30 March 2021, he released the single "Patoreakcja", in which he expressed his feelings about the chaos that followed the success of "Patointeligencja", including a vulgar response to statements made by, among others, Jacek Kurski, Krystyna Pawłowicz, and Jarosław Jakimowicz regarding him and his father. In the piece, he also leaned towards his own work, both talking about the past and the future.

In June 2021, he launched a preorder of the album entitled Młody Matczak. Just six hours after the launch of the preorder, the release was purchased in 15 thousand copies, achieving the gold status. On August 16, the SBM label announced on social media that the album had gone platinum. Another single announcing the album was the song "Kiss cam (podryw roku)", which was co-written with Mata by Szymon Frąckowiak, Mikołaj Vargas and Jakub Laszuk. He wrote the song for a girl, which he announced during the Fryderyk Awards 2021. A music video was made for the song, starring Mata, Young Leosia, and Michał Milowicz. On the 7th of July 2021 the single entered the Global 200 Excl. US (tracks from outside the USA) by the Billboard magazine. Mata's song is the first Polish-language song to appear on this list. On 5 August 2021, during the Fryderyk Awards gala, he announced that the song had been certificated diamond.

On 21 August 2021, he released a single of the same name under the pseudonym Skute Bobo. On September 6, he became the first living Polish artist to break the 2 million listener barrier on Spotify.

Młody Matczak was officially released on 1 October 2021, to mixed reviews. In the same month, the McDonald's restaurant chain announced an offer called "zestaw Maty", which was available from 18 October to 21 November 2021. The campaign sparked controversy among both fans of the rapper and enthusiasts of healthy eating and active lifestyles. However, experts from the advertising industry emphasized the marketing value of the campaign and evaluated it mostly positively.

=== 2022–present: Legal accusations and marijuana legalization ===
On 27 January 2022, he was arrested by police for possession of 1.5 grams of marijuana. He referred to the incident during Empik's Bestsellers 2021 gala, announcing that he would "fight" for the decriminalization of marijuana. On 21 April 2022, he and Young Leosia have released a single featuring three songs in support of the "#Fundacja420", which fights for the legalization of marijuana in Poland.

On 27 May 2022, Mata released "Patoprohibicja (28.01.2022)", continuing the theme about marijuana and its legalization. On the single he also talks about his arrest on 28 January 2022 for possession of 1.5 grams of the drug. It samples the 2005 song "Policeman" by Jamal.

On 23 May 2022, he played a concert on so-called "schodki" near Warsaw's Vistula. At the concert, he promised to play a second one the next day, which did not happen, because the police arrived at the concert. According to the police, Matczak violated the law on security at mass events, for which he faces up to eight years in prison. Matczak apologized the same day for the situation.

On 13 July 2022, he published a statement declaring that he wanted to become president of Poland in 2040. He announced that by that time he would have released a total of 33 albums, the last in 2033, and would then devote seven years to higher education and apprenticeships in order to acquire the competencies important for the position already in the "New World" so that they would not be obsolete. He said he would like to legalize marijuana. On 14 July, during a concert in Wrocław as part of the Mata Tour, he admitted that the film was not entirely serious.

On 21 November 2025, during a concert in Kraków, in one of the songs he performed, he stated that "even a pimp can" become president, referring to the incumbent president of Poland, Karol Nawrocki.

== Discography ==
=== Studio albums ===
Title	Album details	Peak chart positions		Certifications
Title	Album details	POL	POL Stream.	Certifications
100 dni do matury	Released: 18 January 2020; Label: SBM Label; Formats: CD, LP, digital download, streaming	1	3	ZPAV: Diamond
Młody Matczak	Released: 1 October 2021; Label: SBM Label; Formats: CD, LP, digital download, streaming	1	8	ZPAV: 2× Diamond
<33	Released: 8 September 2023; Label: SBM Label; Formats: CD, digital download, streaming	1	1	ZPAV: Gold
#Mata2040	Released: 15 May 2026; Label: independent release, ¸¸♬·¯·♩¸¸♪·¯·♫¸¸♫·¯·♪; Formats: CD, digital download, streaming	6	3	

=== Mixtapes ===
Title	Album details	Peak chart positions	
Title	Album details	POL	POL Stream.
Cold Boy Winter Mixtape (as part of Gombao 33)	Released: 1 April 2023; Label: independent release; Formats: Digital download, streaming	31	11
Cold Boy Winter Mixtape 2	Released: 20 March 2024; Label: independent release, ¸¸♬·¯·♩¸¸♪·¯·♫¸¸♫·¯·♪; Formats: Digital download, streaming	26	10

=== EPs ===
Title	EP details	Peak chart positions		Certifications
Title	EP details	POL	POL Stream.	Certifications
Fumar Mata	Released: 7 April 2019; Label: HHNS Label; Formats: CD, digital download, streaming	—	—	
100 dni po maturze	Released: 1 October 2021; Label: SBM Label; Formats: CD	—	—	
2038: Warszawa	Released: 29 December 2023; Label: ¸¸♬·¯·♩¸¸♪·¯·♫¸¸♫·¯·♪; Formats: Digital download, streaming	—	—	
2039: Złote Piaski	Released: 14 August 2025; Label: ¸¸♬·¯·♩¸¸♪·¯·♫¸¸♫·¯·♪; Formats: Digital download, streaming	1	1	ZPAV: Gold
3347 (with Oki)	Released: 31 August 2025; Label: independent release; Formats: Digital download, streaming	—	—	
2040: Sława	Released: 31 August 2026; Label: ¸¸♬·¯·♩¸¸♪·¯·♫¸¸♫·¯·♪; Formats: Digital download, streaming	2	2	
"—" denotes a recording that did not chart or was not released in that territory.

=== Singles ===
==== As lead artist ====
Title	Year	Peak chart positions				Certifications	Album
Title	Year	POL Air.	POL Stream.	POL Billb.	WW Excl. US	Certifications	Album
"Brum brum"	2019	—	*			ZPAV: Gold	Maffija jest na zawsze
"Biblioteka trap"	2019	—	*			ZPAV: 2× Platinum	100 dni do matury
"Prawy do lewego"	2019	—	*			ZPAV: Platinum	100 dni do matury
"Schodki"	2019	—	47	*		ZPAV: Diamond	100 dni do matury
"Mata Montana"	2019	—	*			ZPAV: 2× Platinum	100 dni do matury
"Patointeligencja"	2019	—	*			ZPAV: Diamond	100 dni do matury
"100 dni do matury"	2020	—	*		—	ZPAV: 3× Platinum	100 dni do matury
"Hotel Maffija" (as part of SB Maffija)	2020	—	*		—	ZPAV: 2× Platinum	Hotel Maffija
"A nie pamiętasz jak?" (as part of SB Maffija)	2020	—	*		—	ZPAV: 4× Platinum	Hotel Maffija
"Biorę się w garść" (as part of SB Maffija)	2020	—	*		—	ZPAV: Gold	Hotel Maffija
"Patoreakcja"	2021	—	*		—	ZPAV: Diamond	Młody Matczak
"Kiss cam (podryw roku)"	2021	37	72	*	198	ZPAV: 2× Diamond	Młody Matczak
"La la la (oh oh)" (featuring White 2115)	2021	—	*		—	ZPAV: 3× Platinum	Młody Matczak
"Skute Bobo" (as Skute Bobo)	2021	—	*		—		Młody Matczak
"Papuga" (featuring Quebonafide and Malik Montana)	2021	—	*		—	ZPAV: Diamond	Młody Matczak
"Szmata"	2021	—	97	*	—	ZPAV: 4× Platinum	Młody Matczak
"Szafir"	2021	28	84	8	—	ZPAV: Diamond	Młody Matczak
"MC"	2021	—	*		—	ZPAV: Platinum	#Mata2040
"#Fundacja420" "Wyspa nadziei" / "Cicho" / "KC" (as Young Bobo with Young Leosia)	2022	—	*	—	—		Non-album single
"Patoprohibicja (28.01.2022)"	2022	—	*	1	—	ZPAV: 2× Platinum	#Mata2040
"Jestem poj384ny"	2022	—	48	1	—	ZPAV: 2× Platinum	#Mata2040
"</3"	2022	—	30	1	—	ZPAV: Platinum	#Mata2040
":("	2022	—	90	3	—	ZPAV: Gold	#Mata2040
"Młody Paderewski"	2023	—	2	2	—	ZPAV: Platinum	#Mata2040
"2 Izoteki"	2023	—	3	3	—	ZPAV: Platinum	#Mata2040
"M"	2023	—	70	—	—		<33
"3 w nocy w Międzyzdrojach" (as part of SB Maffija)	2023	—	3	3	—	ZPAV: Platinum	Hotel Maffija 3
"Klasyczny trap" (as part of SB Maffija)	2023	—	13	12	—	ZPAV: Gold	Hotel Maffija 3
"Pieniądze i sława" (as part of SB Maffija)	2023	—	10	10	—	ZPAV: Gold	Hotel Maffija 3
"Kryształowa kula"	2023	—	52	—	—		<33
"Płyta nie siada"	2023	—	30	—	—		<33
"Jesteś poj384na"	2023	—	17	16	—		<33
"Giewont"	2023	—	7	7	—		Non-album single
"Ca$h Ready" (with Tommy Cash and Jeleel)	2024	—	24	22	—		Cold Boy Winter Mixtape 2
"1 na 100" (with White 2115)	2024	—	1	1	—	ZPAV: 2× Platinum	Non-album single
"Falochrony" (with Roksana Węgiel)	2024	31	2	2	—	ZPAV: 2× Platinum	2039: Złote Piaski
"Lloret de Mar"	2024	30	1	1	—	ZPAV: 3× Platinum	EA Sports FC 25
"Heavy" (as Polak GBP)	2024	—	44	—	—		Non-album singles
"Bunsen Burner" (with SL)	2024	—	—	—	—		Non-album singles
"Intro"	2025	—	16	14	—		#Mata2040
"Up! Up! Up!"	2025	—	1	1	—		#Mata2040
"Nienawidzę być w klubie" (as Gombao 33)	2025	49	3	3	—		#Mata2040
"To tylko wiosna" (featuring Maryla Rodowicz)	2025	—	2	3	—		#Mata2040
"Kamikaze" (featuring Skolim and Khaid)	2025	34	1	1	—	ZPAV: Platinum	2039: Złote Piaski
"Bez nikogo obok" (with Oki)	2025	—	5	3	—		3347
"Pokolorowana" (with Deemz and Szpaku)	2025	—	3	4	—	ZPAV: Gold	Non-album single
"Haters Gonna Hate"	2025	—	20	16	—		#Mata2040
"Sorry, taki jestem ;("	2025	—	9	9	—		#Mata2040
"To nieprawda, że nie lubisz róż ;**" (featuring Sobel)	2025	46	5	4	—		Non-album single
"Będę prezydentem :)"	2025	—	2	3	—		#Mata2040
"Freaky" (with Fagata)	2026	—	3	2	—	ZPAV: Gold	Non-album singles
"Pangea" (with Polo G)	2026	—	36	—	—		Non-album singles
"Echo"	2026	—	11	8	—		2040: Sława
"Brakuje mi Maty"	2026	—	26	20	—		#Mata2040
"1 na 1 000 000" (with White 2115)	2026	—	2	3	—		2040: Sława
"RMB (Ring My Bell) – Polish Remix" (with Aitch)	2026	18	6	1	—		Non-album single
"Gdzie jest perka?"	2026	—	—	—	—		2040: Sława
"100k" (with Gombao 33, Wyguś, Tadeo and Szczepan)	2026	—	84	—	—		Non-album single
"—" denotes items which were not released in that country or failed to chart. "*" denotes the chart did not exist at that time.

==== As featured artist ====
Title	Year	Peak chart positions			Certifications	Album
Title	Year	POL Air.	POL Stream.	POL Billb.	Certifications	Album
"Zobaczymy" (Solar featuring Mata, Kacperczyk and Jan-Rapowanie)	2019	—	*		ZPAV: Platinum	Pokój zero
"PDW" (Białas featuring Mata and Deemz)	2020	—	*		ZPAV: 2× Platinum	ME
"I Took a Pill in Remiza" (Deemz featuring Gombao 33)	2020	—	*			Sauce
"Aromatyczne przyprawy" (Żabson featuring Mata)	2020	—	*		ZPAV: Platinum	Ziomalski Mixtape
"Oh oh (lalala)" (White 2115 featuring Mata)	2021	—	*		ZPAV: 2× Platinum	Rockstar: Do zachodu słońca
"Biernik (kogo? co?)" (DJ Decks featuring Mata and WoLa)	2022	—	35	—	ZPAV: Gold	Mixtape 8
"Owoce 33" (Fukaj featuring Mata)	2023	—	7	7	ZPAV: Gold	Preludium
"Inny świat" (Dobry Dzieciak featuring Mata)	2023	—	39	—	ZPAV: Gold	Uwolnić Bonusa
"Blicky" (Beteo featuring Mata)	2023	—	29	—	ZPAV: Gold	Free Shooter
"London Eye" (Slowez featuring White 2115 and Polak GBP)	2024	—	—	—		Czuję się jak Slowez
"Niebo" (Jan-Rapowanie featuring Mata)	2025	—	80	—		Groteska
"Toksyna" (Aron x Krux featuring Mata and Bajorson)	2025	—	—	—		Non-album single
"Plan B" (Pezet featuring Mata and Kaz Bałagane)	2025	25	2	2	ZPAV: 2× Platinum	Muzyka popularna
"Philipp Plein" (Młody West featuring Mata)	2026	—	97	—		FF DLX: Rebirth
"—" denotes items which were not released in that country or failed to chart. "*" denotes the chart did not exist at that time.

=== Other charted and certified songs ===
Title	Year	Peak chart positions		Certifications	Album
Title	Year	POL Stream.	POL Billb.	Certifications	Album
"Piszę to na matmie"	2020	*		ZPAV: Platinum	100 dni do matury
"Homo ludens"	2020	*		ZPAV: Gold	100 dni do matury
"Piszę to na matmie"	2020	*		ZPAV: Platinum	100 dni do matury
"Tango"	2020	*		ZPAV: Platinum	100 dni do matury
"Żółte flamastry i grube katechetki"	2020	*		ZPAV: 3× Platinum	100 dni do matury
"Lezore"	2020	*		ZPAV: Gold	100 dni do matury
"Wino Sangrita (s01e01)"	2020	*		ZPAV: Gold	100 dni do matury
"Nero"	2020	*		ZPAV: Gold	100 dni do matury
"Gombao 33" (featuring Wyguś, Szczepan and Adam)	2020	*		ZPAV: 4× Platinum	100 dni do matury
"Drift" (Białas featuring Mata)	2020	*		ZPAV: 2× Platinum	H8
"Co Ty na to?" (as part of SB Maffija)	2020	*		ZPAV: Gold	Maffija jest na zawsze
"Aspartam" (Quebonafide featuring Mata)	2020	*		ZPAV: 2× Platinum	Romantic Psycho
"Mata #hot16challenge2"	2020	*		ZPAV: Gold	#hot16challenge2
"NOBOCOTEL" (as part of SB Maffija)	2020	*		ZPAV: Gold	Hotel Maffija
"IKEA (intro)"	2021	*		ZPAV: Gold	Młody Matczak
"Blok" (featuring Gombao 33)	2021	*		ZPAV: 2× Platinum	Młody Matczak
"Nasza klasa ale to DRILL"	2021	*		ZPAV: Platinum	Młody Matczak
"2001"	2021	*		ZPAV: Platinum	Młody Matczak
"Faka"	2021	*		ZPAV: Platinum	Młody Matczak
"Kurtz" (featuring Taco Hemingway)	2021	*		ZPAV: Platinum	Młody Matczak
"67-410"	2021	*		ZPAV: Gold	Młody Matczak
"15,2 (Freestyle)"	2021	*		ZPAV: Gold	Młody Matczak
"Młody Bachor (outro)" (featuring Gombao 33)	2021	*		ZPAV: Platinum	Młody Matczak
"Awaryjne lądowanie" (as part of SB Maffija)	2023	50	—		Hotel Maffija 3
"Elektryczne krzesło"	2023	78	—		<33
"W głowie od pieniędzy się p*******"	2023	59	—		<33
"Tired of Love"	2023	31	—		<33
"Różowe Osh33"	2023	53	—		<33
"W kraju schabowych kotletów"	2023	3	2		2038: Warszawa
"Joey Tribbiani"	2023	21	20		2038: Warszawa
"Beze mnie luv x sosa type beat (pilot – 29.12.2038)"	2023	45	—		2038: Warszawa
"Dzień świra (outro)"	2023	41	—		2038: Warszawa
"Po burzy wyjdzie słońce" (Quebonafide featuring Mata)	2025	100	—		Północ / południe
"Bawię się"	2025	32	—		2039: Złote Piaski
"O północy" (featuring Kizo and Blacha)	2025	4	4		2039: Złote Piaski
"Palma de Mallorca" (featuring Żabson)	2025	4	4		2039: Złote Piaski
"24g" (featuring White 2115)	2025	12	9		2039: Złote Piaski
"Princess Passenger" (featuring god.wifi)	2025	15	14		2039: Złote Piaski
"Najlepsza w tym klubie" (featuring Gombao 33, Wyguś, Tadeo and Szczepan)	2025	14	12		2039: Złote Piaski
"Hobby"	2025	27	25		2039: Złote Piaski
"Moment" (featuring WoLa)	2025	85	—		2039: Złote Piaski
"Lemury" (featuring Beka KSH)	2025	82	—		2039: Złote Piaski
"Blow Up the Roof"	2025	65	—		2039: Złote Piaski
"Ćwierćwieku" (with Oki)	2025	21	16		3347
"Ha ha ha" (with Oki)	2025	24	17		3347
"Prolog" (with Frédéric Chopin)	2026	36	25		#Mata2040
"Skepta"	2026	73	—		#Mata2040
"Hiszpańska inkwizycja"	2026	60	—		#Mata2040
"Dembélé"	2026	79	—		#Mata2040
"5 malin"	2026	72	—		#Mata2040
"Na granicy cringu"	2026	76	—		2040: Sława
"—" denotes items which were not released in that country or failed to chart. "*" denotes the chart did not exist at that time.

== Awards and nominations ==
Ceremony	Year	Nominee/work	Category	Result	Ref(s)
Fryderyk Awards	2021	100 dni do matury	Album of the Year – Hip-Hop/R&B	Won	
Fryderyk Awards	2021	Mata	Best Debut	Won	
Popkillery Awards	2020	Mata	Discovery of the Year (Jury)	Won	
Popkillery Awards	2020	Mata	Discovery of the Year (Public)	Won	
Popkillery Awards	2020	"Patointeligencja"	Single of the Year (Jury)	Won	
Popkillery Awards	2020	"Patointeligencja"	Single of the Year (Public)	Won	
