= Maid Marian Entertainment =

Developer of browser-based video games

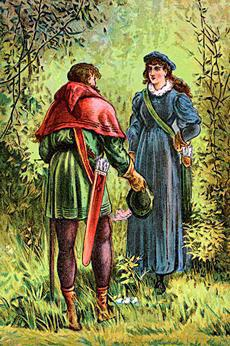
Robin Hood with Maid Marian, the companies namesake

Maid Marian Entertainment (sometimes shortened to MME) is a gaming site/company produced by Gene Endrody and other respective parties. It was the original home of Sherwood, which later evolved into Sherwood Dungeon, with the addition of an in-game dungeon. Other games created by MME include Club Marian, Moonbase, Marian's World (an older version of Club Marian), Tankball, Tankball 2, Ratinator and Colin's Crazy Carrera.

== Sherwood Dungeon ==
The most notable game is the browser based MMORPG Sherwood Dungeon. The game was released in 2002, and was originally titled Sherwood Temple. The original version is now referred to as Sherwood Classic. In May 2005, Sherwood Dungeon was released. Frequent updates continued until 2016 when Gene Endrody began working for Hothead Games.
