= Malik Montana =

Polish rapper (born 1989)

- Born: Mosa Ghawsi; 11 March 1989 (age 37); Hamburg, West Germany
- Origin: Warsaw, Poland
- Genres: Trap; hip hop; gangsta rap
- Years active: 2008–present
- Label: GM2L

Mosa Ghawsi (born 11 March 1989), known professionally as Malik Montana, is a German-Polish rapper. He began making music in 2008, releasing his debut album, Naajak, in 2016. It would be followed by the release of Haram Masari in 2017, Tijara and 022 in 2018, Import/Export in 2019, and Adwokat diabła in 2023.

Born in Hamburg, Mosa moved to Warsaw at the age of 15. He began making English-language music in 2008, making his debut in Polish rap in 2015.

== Early life ==
Mosa Ghawsi was born in 1989 in Hamburg. His father was from Afghanistan, while his mother was Polish-Greek. According to an interview with PopKiller, he traveled with his brother at the age of 15 to Poland, settling in the Wrzeciono neighborhood of Bielany, a district in Warsaw.

== Career ==
=== Music ===
Mosa began to make music under the pseudonym Malik Montana in 2008; the last portion of the pseudonym, "Montana", is derived from the Scarface character Tony Montana. Early on in his career, he made English-language hip-hop songs with the German-Polish rapper Sentino; he continued to make songs in English until 2012, when he began to appear in foreign concerts within Poland.

On 20 October 2015, he made his debut in Polish rap with "NaNaNa", which featured Diho and Białas. In 2017, Sentino was kicked off the GM2L ("Get Money Live Life") label; afterwards, Malik took over the label.

Malik Montana released Tijara in 2018; it peaked at number two on OLiS and was certified gold by the Polish Society of the Phonographic Industry. He also released several songs certified gold by the ZPAV, with "Mówili" certified as 2× platinum. In 2019, he released Import/Export, which peaked at number three on OLiS and was certified platinum. He also released "Jagodzianki" the same year, which featured Mr. Polska and was certified 4× platinum.

In 2021, Malik Montana announced an album with guest appearances from only French rappers; it is to be named WAW CDG, after Warsaw Chopin Airport and Charles de Gaulle Airport. He also performed at the Wrocław Hip Hop Festival.

In 2023, Malik Montana released Adwokat diabła, which included features from Fivio Foreign, NLE Choppa and Headie One.

=== Tijara Mobile ===
Malik established Tijara Mobile, a phone network, on 4 February 2020. The purpose of the network was to interact with fans; the network provided SMS and voicemail services, as well as announcements regarding contests and events involving Malik Montana.

Tijara Mobile went defunct in November 2021.

== Discography ==
=== Albums ===
List of albums, with selected details
Title	Details	Peak chart positions	Certifications
Title	Details	OLiS	Certifications
Haram Masari	Released: 10 February 2016; Label: GM2L; Format: Online streaming	–	
Naaajak	Released: 9 December 2016; Label: GM2L; Format: Online streaming	–	
Tijara	Released: 24 May 2018; Label: GM2L; Format: Online streaming	2	ZPAV: Gold
022	Released: 16 November 2018; Label: GM2L; Format: Online streaming	–	
Import/Export	Released: 27 September 2019; Label: GM2L; Format: Online streaming	3	ZPAV: Platinum
Adwokat diabła	Released: 10 March 2023; Label: GM2L; Format: Online streaming	–	
Export/Import	Released: 19 January 2024; Label: GM2L; Format: Online streaming	1	

=== Singles ===
List of singles, with selected details
Title	Year	Peak chart positions	Certifications	Album
Title	Year	POL	Certifications	Album
"Do rana"	2015	X	ZPAV: Gold	Haram Masari
"1szy nos"	2017	X	ZPAV: Platinum	Tijara
"Baby same przyjdą"	2017	X		Tijara
"Pelikan"	2017	X		Tijara
"Powiedz Co"	2017	X		Tijara
"Who You Mam"	2017	X	ZPAV: Gold	Tijara
"KE6Z" (ft. KiKi)	2018	X		Tijara
"Mieli"	2018	X	ZPAV: Gold	Tijara
"Shut Up" (with 2's Day and Dio Mudara)	2018	X		Non-album single
"Botoks"	2018	X		Non-album single
"6.3 AMG"	2018	X	ZPAV: Gold	Tijara
"Mówili"	2018	X	ZPAV: 2× Platinum	Tijara
"Teraz i tu" (ft. Sobota and Yogi)	2018	X	ZPAV: Gold	Tijara
"Trajkotka"	2018	X		022
"Dla rodziny"	2018	X	ZPAV: Gold	022
"To nie żart"	2018	X		022
"Wyrosłem na blokach" (with Dio Mudara)	2018	X	ZPAV: Gold	022
"One Night Stand" (with Dio Mudara)	2018	X		022
"Jagodzianki" (with Mr. Polska)	2019	X	ZPAV: 4× Platinum	Import/Export
"Robię Yeah" (ft. K Koke)	2019	X	ZPAV: 2× Platinum	Import/Export
"7 5 0" (ft. Millonair and Bonez MC)	2019	X	ZPAV: Platinum	Import/Export
"Mona Lisa"	2019	X	ZPAV: Platinum	Import/Export
"VvsNike" (ft. Lil Toe)	2019	X	ZPAV: Gold	Import/Export
"Za pasem"	2019	X	ZPAV: Gold	Import/Export
"Jungle Boyz"	2019	X	ZPAV: Gold	Import/Export
"Niedostępny" (ft. DMN)	2020	X	ZPAV: 3× Platinum	Adwokat diabła
"Rundki" (ft. Diho, Alberto and Bibic)	2020	X	ZPAV: 2× Platinum	Adwokat diabła
"Mordo weź" (with LX)	2020	X	ZPAV: Platinum	Adwokat diabła
"Wuwua" (with Josef Bratan)	2021	X	ZPAV: Gold	Non-album single
"Bratan" (ft. Tovaritch)	2021	X	ZPAV: Gold	Adwokat diabła
"Głosy w Głowie"	2021	X		Adwokat diabła
"Click Clack Bang" (ft. Dosseha)	2021	X		Adwokat diabła
"3 telefony"	2021	X		Adwokat diabła
"Sukcesu cena" (with Trobi)	2021	X		Adwokat diabła
"Chodź" (with Maxwell)	2022	19		Adwokat diabła
"Jetlag" (with DaChoyce)	2022	1	ZPAV: 4× Platinum	Non-album singles
"Biznesmeni z podwórka" (with Kazior and Alberto)	2022	23		Non-album singles
"Brudasy with Atittude" (with Farid Bang)	2022	5		Adwokat diabła
"Do tańca" (with Żabson)	2022	3		Non-album single
