= Żabson =

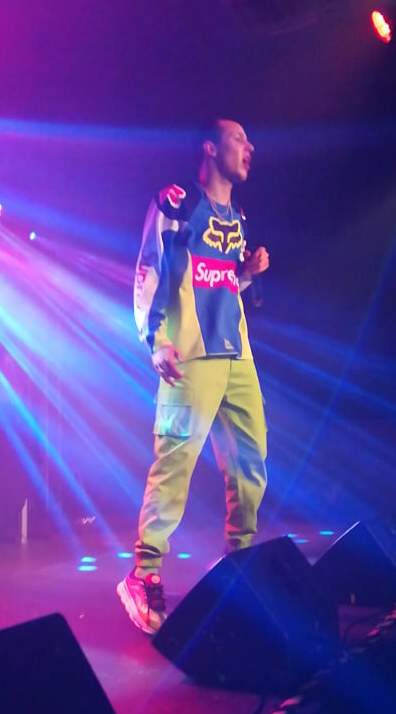
- Żabson during a concert in Kraków

Background information
- Born: Mateusz Zawistowski; 2 July 1994 (age 32); Opoczno, Poland
- Genres: Hip hop, trap
- Occupations: Rapper, songwriter
- Years active: 2010–present

Mateusz Zawistowski (born 2 July 1994), known professionally as Żabson, is a Polish rapper and songwriter.

== Life ==
Żabson was born on 2 July 1994 in Opoczno, Poland, and was raised there. In 2011 he came to Kielce and looked for people who were also interested in rap. He took part in freestyle fights in clubs, where he met the rapper Chaos. Thanks to him he started his music career. He also went to high school in Kielce.

His stage name is the nickname his friends called him when he was younger.

On 14 July 2015 he released his debut mini-album, titled NieKumam. On 20 June 2016 he unveiled his second EP titled Passion Fruits.

On 23 February 2018 he released his debut studio album, titled To ziomal. The release debuted at number 3 on the Polish OLiS sales list. On 15 August he released a follow-up EP titled Trapollo. In 2018, he participated with Pezet, Sitek and Sokół in "Projekt tymczasem" organized by EB, Polish beer brand.

In 2019, he released another album titled Internaziomal. On 1 February 2021 he released the mixtape Ziomalski Mixtape.

He has collaborated with artists such as Borixon, Quebonafide, Białas, Kaz Bałagane, Solar and Sitek, among others.

Żabson is inspired by music from Atlanta and Chicago. Some of his favorite artists are Kanye West, Travis Scott, Young Thug, and A$AP Rocky (who he believes started a new era of hip-hop). He loves simple trap backgrounds. He has a very melodic way of rapping. He doesn't try to convey a message - he prefers to talk about parties, girls and making money.

== Discography ==
=== Studio albums ===
Title	Album details	Peak chart positions	Certifications
Title	Album details	POL	Certifications
To ziomal	Released: 23 February 2018; Label: WWW, Step Hurt, e-Muzyka; Format: CD, digital download	3	ZPAV: Gold
Internaziomal	Released: 30 October 2019; Label: Revolume, Step Hurt; Format: CD, digital download	3	ZPAV: Platinum

=== Collaborative albums ===
Title	Album details	Peak chart positions	Certifications
Title	Album details	POL	Certifications
Amfisbena (with Young Igi)	Released: 11 March 2022; Label: Def Jam Recordings, Universal Music Polska; Format: CD, digital download	2	ZPAV: Platinum

=== EPs ===
Title	Album details
NieKumam	Released: 14 July 2015; Label: nielegal, QueQuality; Format: CD, digital download
Passion Fruits EP	Released: 20 June 2016; Label: QueQuality; Format: CD, digital download
Trapollo	Released: 8 August 2018; Label: self-released; Format: CD, digital download

=== Mixtapes ===
Title	Album details	Peak chart positions	Certifications
Title	Album details	POL	Certifications
Ziomalski Mixtape	Released: 1 February 2021; Label: Internaziomal, Step Hurt; Format: CD, digital download	1	ZPAV: 2× Platinum
