= List of number-one albums of 2015 (Poland) =

This is a list of number-one albums of 2015 in Poland, per the OLiS chart.

== Chart history ==
Issue date	Album	Artist(s)	Reference
2 January	Migracje	Mela Koteluk	
9 January	Hiper/Chimera	Donatan and Cleo	
16 January	Scarlett	LemON	
23 January	Keep Calm and Dance with Empik	Various artists	
30 January	Comfort and Happiness	Dawid Podsiadło	
6 February	Comfort and Happiness	Dawid Podsiadło	
13 February	Polska nostalgia – część 1-sza	Various artists	
20 February	Paparanoja	Enej	
27 February	Fifty Shades of Grey: Original Motion Picture Soundtrack	Various artists	
6 March	Podróż zwana życiem	O.S.T.R.	
13 March	Mini World	Indila	
20 March	Mini World	Indila	
27 March	Nowe rzeczy	KęKę	
3 April	Ezoteryka	Quebonafide	
10 April	Spadochron	Mela Koteluk	
17 April	Smooth Jazz Cafe 14	Various artists	
24 April	Smooth Jazz Cafe 14	Various artists	
1 May	Królowie życia	Gang Albanii	
8 May	Królowie życia	Gang Albanii	
15 May	Odmienny stan świadomości	Trzeci Wymiar	
22 May	Atramentowa...	Stanisława Celińska	
29 May	Królowie życia	Gang Albanii	
5 June	Atramentowa...	Stanisława Celińska	
12 June	How Big, How Blue, How Beautiful	Florence and the Machine	
19 June	How Big, How Blue, How Beautiful	Florence and the Machine	
26 June	Vanillahajs	Tede and Sir Michu	
3 July	Fifty Shades of Grey: Original Motion Picture Soundtrack	Various artists	
16 July	Love in Portofino	Andrea Bocelli	
23 July	Empik prezentuje dobre piosenki: Agnieszka Osiecka zaśpiewana	Various artists	
30 July	Empik prezentuje dobre piosenki: Agnieszka Osiecka zaśpiewana	Various artists	
6 August	Empik prezentuje dobre piosenki: Agnieszka Osiecka zaśpiewana	Various artists	
13 August	Hozier	Hozier	
20 August	Empik Jazz Club: The Very Best of Frank Sinatra	Frank Sinatra	
27 August	Empik Jazz Club: The Very Best of Frank Sinatra	Frank Sinatra	
3 September	Empik prezentuje dobre piosenki: Leonard Cohen zaśpiewany	Various artists	
10 September	Empik prezentuje dobre piosenki: Leonard Cohen zaśpiewany	Various artists	
17 September	The Book of Souls	Iron Maiden	
24 September	Empik Jazz Club: The Very Best of Ray Charles	Ray Charles	
1 October	Rattle That Lock	David Gilmour	
8 October	Migracje	Mela Koteluk	
15 October	Ulice bogów. Produkcja Fleczer	Miuosh	
22 October	The Best of Andrea Bocelli: Vivere	Andrea Bocelli	
29 October	The Best of 25 Years	Sting	
5 November	The Best of 25 Years	Sting	
12 November	The Best of 25 Years	Sting	
19 November	Annoyance and Disappointment	Dawid Podsiadło	
26 November	Made in the A.M.	One Direction	
3 December	25	Adele	
10 December	25	Adele	
17 December	25	Adele	
24 December	25	Adele	
31 December	25	Adele	

== See also ==
- List of number-one singles of 2015 (Poland)
