= Taniec z gwiazdami season 27 =

Polish TV show

Taniec z gwiazdami
- Season 27
- Hosted by: Krzysztof Ibisz; Paulina Sykut-Jeżyna
- Judges: Rafał Maserak; Ewa Kasprzyk; Tomasz Wygoda; Iwona Pavlović
- Celebrity winner: Anita Sokołowska
- Professional winner: Jacek Jeschke
- No. of episodes: 10

Release
- Original network: Polsat
- Original release: 3 March – 5 May 2024

Season chronology
- ← Previous; Season 26 Next → Season 28

The 27th season of Taniec z gwiazdami, the Polish edition of Dancing with the Stars began on 3 March 2024. This was the fourteenth season aired on Polsat. For the first time since autumn 2011, it was broadcast on Sunday. Iwona Pavlović came back as a juror among Ewa Kasprzyk, Rafał Maserak and Tomasz Wygoda, who replaced Andrzej Grabowski, Andrzej Piaseczny and Michał Malitowski. Krzysztof Ibisz and Paulina Sykut-Jeżyna returned as hosts while Izabela Janachowska didn't.

Michał Danilczuk, Marcin Hakiel, Sara Janicka, Jacek Jeschke, Katarzyna Vu Manh and Hanna Żudziewicz-Jeschke returned to the series as a pro and Kamil Gwara, Michał Kassin, Mieszko Masłowski, Magdalena Perlińska, Izabela Skierska and Daria Syta joined the pros.

On 5 May, Anita Sokołowska and her partner Jacek Jeschke were crowned the champions.

== Couples ==
| Celebrity | Notability | Professional partner | Status | Source(s) |
|---|---|---|---|---|
| Adam Kszczot | Olympic middle-distance runner | Katarzyna Vu Manh | Eliminated 1st on 10 March 2024 | |
| Małgorzata Ostrowska-Królikowska | Klan actress | Kamil Gwara | Eliminated 2nd on 17 March 2024 | |
| Beata Olga Kowalska | Ranczo actress and Magia nagości. Polska host | Mieszko Masłowski | Eliminated 3rd on 24 March 2024 | |
| Filip Chajzer | Television & radio presenter | Hanna Żudziewicz | Eliminated 4th on 24 March 2024 | |
| Kamil Baleja | Radio ZET presenter | Magdalena Perlińska | Eliminated 5th on 31 March 2024 | |
| Aleksander Mackiewicz | Gliniarze actor | Izabela Skierska | Eliminated 6th on 7 April 2024 | |
| Dagmara Kaźmierska | Reality television star | Marcin Hakiel | Withdrew on 18 April 2024 | |
| Krzysztof Szczepaniak | Film & television actor | Sara Janicka | Eliminated 7th on 14 & 21 April 2024 | |
| Maciej Musiał | Actor & television presenter | Daria Syta | Eliminated 8th on 28 April 2024 | |
| Julia Kuczyńska | Influencer & fashion blogger known as Maffashion | Michał Danilczuk | Third place on 5 May 2024 | |
| Roksana "Roxie" Węgiel | Singer-songwriter and Junior Eurovision 2018 winner | Michał Kassin | Runners-up on 5 May 2024 | |
| Anita Sokołowska | Actress & theater director | Jacek Jeschke | Winners on 5 May 2024 | |

== Scores ==
| Couple | Place | 1 | 2 | 1+2 | 3 | 4 | 5 | 6 | 7 | 8 | 9 | 10 |
|---|---|---|---|---|---|---|---|---|---|---|---|---|
| Anita & Jacek | 1 | 32† | 35 | 67† | 35 | 39† | 40† | 35 | 39+36=75 | 40+38=78 | 34+40=74 | 40+37+40=117 |
| Roxie & Michał | 2 | 29 | 35 | 64 | 40† | 39† | 32 | 40† | 40+39=79† | 40+40=80† | 40+40=80† | 40+39+40=119† |
| Julia & Michał | 3 | 29 | 37 | 66 | 33 | 27 | 32 | 35 | 34+40=74 | 40+40=80† | 36+37=73‡ | 40+35+40=115‡ |
| Maciej & Daria | 4 | 28 | 33 | 61 | 34 | 32 | 40† | 30 | 32+37=69 | 35+40=75‡ | 35+38=73‡ | |
| Krzysztof & Sara | 5 | 21 | 40† | 61 | 29 | 39† | 31 | 40† | 32+30=62 | 35+40=75‡ | | |
| Dagmara & Marcin | 6 | 17‡ | 23‡ | 40‡ | 21‡ | 20‡ | 23‡ | 19‡ | 16+7=23‡ | — | | |
| Aleksander & Izabela | 7 | 32† | 34 | 66 | 37 | 35 | 38 | 38 | | | | |
| Kamil & Magdalena | 8 | 17‡ | 25 | 42 | 25 | 20‡ | 25 | | | | | |
| Filip & Hanna | 9 | 22 | 26 | 48 | 30 | 25 | | | | | | |
| Beata & Mieszko | 10 | 18 | 31 | 49 | 25 | 22 | | | | | | |
| Małgorzata & Kamil | 11 | 19 | 28 | 47 | 22 | | | | | | | |
| Adam & Katarzyna | 12 | 18 | 25 | 43 | | | | | | | | |

Red numbers indicate the lowest score for each week.
Green numbers indicate the highest score for each week.
indicates the couple eliminated that week.
indicates the couple that was eliminated but later returned to the competition.
indicates the returning couple that finished in the bottom two or three.
indicates the winning couple.
indicates the runner-up.
indicates the couple in third place.
indicates the couple withdrew from the competition.

== Average score chart ==
This table only counts for dances scored on a 40-points scale.

| Rank by average | Place | Couple | Total points | Number of dances | Average |
|---|---|---|---|---|---|
| 1 | 2 | Roxie & Michał | 573 | 15 | 38.2 |
| 2 | 1 | Anita & Jacek | 560 | 15 | 37.3 |
| 3 | 3 | Julia & Michał | 535 | 15 | 35.7 |
| 3 | 7 | Aleksander & Izabela | 214 | 6 | 35.7 |
| 5 | 4 | Maciej & Daria | 414 | 12 | 34.5 |
| 6 | 5 | Krzysztof & Sara | 337 | 10 | 33.7 |
| 7 | 9 | Filip & Hanna | 103 | 4 | 25.8 |
| 8 | 10 | Beata & Mieszko | 96 | 4 | 24.0 |
| 9 | 11 | Małgorzata & Kamil | 69 | 3 | 23.0 |
| 10 | 8 | Kamil & Magdalena | 112 | 5 | 22.4 |
| 11 | 12 | Adam & Katarzyna | 43 | 2 | 21.5 |
| 12 | 6 | Dagmara & Marcin | 146 | 8 | 18.3 |

== Highest and lowest scoring performances ==
The best and worst performances in each dance according to the judges' 40-point scale:

| Dance | Best dancer(s) | Highest score | Worst dancer(s) | Lowest score |
|---|---|---|---|---|
| Cha-cha-cha | Aleksander Mackiewicz; Anita Sokołowska; Julia Kuczyńska | 35 | Beata Olga Kowalska | 18 |
| Tango | Krzysztof Szczepaniak; Roksana "Roxie" Węgiel | 40 | Dagmara Kaźmierska | 21 |
| Jive | Maciej Musiał | 40 | Krzysztof Szczepaniak | 21 |
| Paso Doble | Roksana "Roxie" Węgiel | 40 | Adam Kszczot | 18 |
| Waltz | Julia Kuczyńska; Krzysztof Szczepaniak | 40 | Małgorzata Ostrowska-Królikowska | 19 |
| Viennese Waltz | Krzysztof Szczepaniak; Roksana "Roxie" Węgiel | 39 | Dagmara Kaźmierska | 17 |
| Rumba | Roksana "Roxie" Węgiel; Anita Sokołowska | 40 | Kamil Baleja | 17 |
| Quickstep | Maciej Musiał | 38 | Dagmara Kaźmierska | 16 |
| Foxtrot | Anita Sokołowska; Julia Kuczyńska; Roksana "Roxie" Węgiel | 40 | Kamil Baleja | 20 |
| Samba | Roksana "Roxie" Węgiel | 40 | Maciej Musiał | 30 |
| Contemporary | Maciej Musiał; Roksana "Roxie" Węgiel; Krzysztof Szczepaniak; Anita Sokołowska | 40 | | |
| Broadway | Dagmara Kaźmierska | 7 | | |
| Salsa | Julia Kuczyńska; Roksana "Roxie" Węgiel | 40 | Maciej Musiał | 35 |
| Charleston | Anita Sokołowska | 40 | Julia Kuczyńska | 37 |
| Freestyle | Roksana "Roxie" Węgiel; Julia Kuczyńska; Anita Sokołowska | 40 | | |

== Couples' highest and lowest scoring dances ==
According to the 40-point scale:

| Couples | Highest scoring dance(s) | Lowest scoring dance(s) |
|---|---|---|
| Anita & Jacek | Foxtrot, Contemporary, Charleston, Rumba, Freestyle (40) | Tango (32) |
| Roxie & Michał | Paso Doble (twice), Contemporary, Samba, Rumba, Tango, Salsa, Foxtrot, Freestyle (40) | Cha-cha-cha (29) |
| Julia & Michał | Waltz (twice), Foxtrot, Salsa, Freestyle (40) | Quickstep (27) |
| Maciej & Daria | Contemporary, Jive (40) | Cha-cha-cha (28) |
| Krzysztof & Sara | Tango, Contemporary, Waltz (40) | Jive (21) |
| Dagmara & Marcin | Cha-cha-cha, Waltz (23) | Broadway (7) |
| Aleksander & Izabela | Paso Doble, Samba (38) | Viennese Waltz (32) |
| Kamil & Magdalena | Waltz, Jive, Viennese Waltz (25) | Rumba (17) |
| Filip & Hanna | Viennese Waltz (30) | Tango (22) |
| Beata & Mieszko | Waltz (31) | Cha-cha-cha (18) |
| Małgorzata & Kamil | Rumba (28) | Waltz (19) |
| Adam & Katarzyna | Quickstep (25) | Paso Doble (18) |

== Weekly scores ==
Unless indicated otherwise, individual judges scores in the charts below (given in parentheses) are listed in this order from left to right: Rafał Maserak, Ewa Kasprzyk, Tomasz Wygoda, Iwona Pavlović.

=== Week 1: Season Premiere ===
Running order

| Couple | Score | Dance | Music |
|---|---|---|---|
| Beata & Mieszko | 18 (5,5,5,3) | Cha-cha-cha | "I'm Every Woman"—Chaka Khan |
| Filip & Hanna | 22 (6,6,6,4) | Tango | "Believer"—Imagine Dragons |
| Krzysztof & Sara | 21 (5,5,6,5) | Jive | "Małomiasteczkowy"—Dawid Podsiadło |
| Adam & Katarzyna | 18 (5,6,4,3) | Paso Doble | "Hej hej!"—Daria Zawiałow |
| Roxie & Michał | 29 (7,8,7,7) | Cha-cha-cha | "Don't Start Now"—Dua Lipa |
| Małgorzata & Kamil | 19 (4,7,5,3) | Waltz | "Angel"—Sarah McLachlan |
| Julia & Michał | 29 (7,8,7,7) | Jive | "Blinding Lights"—The Weeknd |
| Dagmara & Marcin | 17 (3,8,4,2) | Viennese Waltz | "Lubię wracać tam, gdzie byłem"—Zbigniew Wodecki |
| Kamil & Magdalena | 17 (4,7,3,3) | Rumba | "Careless Whisper"—George Michael |
| Anita & Jacek | 32 (8,8,8,8) | Tango | "Początek"—Męskie Granie Orkiestra |
| Aleksander & Izabela | 32 (8,8,8,8) | Viennese Waltz | "Perfect"—Ed Sheeran |
| Maciej & Daria | 28 (7,8,7,6) | Cha-cha-cha | "Can't Stop the Feeling"—Justin Timberlake |

=== Week 2: Movie Week ===
Running order

| Couple | Score | Dance | Music | Movie | Results |
|---|---|---|---|---|---|
| Aleksander & Izabela | 34 (8,10,8,8) | Jive | "I'll Be There for You"—The Rembrandts | Friends | Safe |
| Julia & Michał | 37 (9,10,9,9) | Viennese Waltz | "Earned It"—The Weeknd | Fifty Shades of Grey | Safe |
| Dagmara & Marcin | 23 (6,9,5,3) | Cha-cha-cha | "Dance the Night"—Dua Lipa | Barbie | Bottom two |
| Kamil & Magdalena | 25 (6,9,6,4) | Waltz | "Can You Feel the Love Tonight"—Elton John | The Lion King | Safe |
| Anita & Jacek | 35 (9,10,8,8) | Jive | "You Never Can Tell"—Chuck Berry | Pulp Fiction | Safe |
| Krzysztof & Sara | 40 (10,10,10,10) | Tango | "Por una Cabeza"—Carlos Gardel | Scent of a Woman | Safe |
| Adam & Katarzyna | 25 (6,8,6,5) | Quickstep | "Co ty tutaj robisz"—Elektryczne Gitary | Kiler | Eliminated |
| Małgorzata & Kamil | 28 (7,10,6,5) | Rumba | "Shallow"—Lady Gaga & Bradley Cooper | A Star Is Born | Safe |
| Maciej & Daria | 33 (8,10,8,7) | Tango | "Así Se Baila El Tango"—Veronica Verdier | Take the Lead | Safe |
| Roxie & Michał | 35 (9,10,8,8) | Quickstep | "Crazy in Love"—Beyoncé feat. Jay Z | The Great Gatsby | Safe |
| Beata & Mieszko | 31 (8,9,8,6) | Waltz | "My Heart Will Go On"—Celine Dion | Titanic | Safe |
| Filip & Hanna | 26 (7,8,6,5) | Cha-cha-cha | "Turn Up the Sunshine"—Diana Ross & Tame Impala | Minions | Safe |

=== Week 3: ABBA Week ===
Running order

| Couple | Score | Dance | Music | Result |
|---|---|---|---|---|
| Krzysztof & Sara | 29 (7,9,7,6) | Cha-cha-cha | "Honey, Honey"—ABBA | Safe |
| Anita & Jacek | 35 (8,10,9,8) | Waltz | "The Winner Takes It All"—ABBA | Safe |
| Kamil & Magdalena | 25 (6,8,6,5) | Jive | "Lay All Your Love on Me"—ABBA | Bottom two |
| Roxie & Michał | 40 (10,10,10,10) | Paso Doble | "Gimme! Gimme! Gimme! (A Man After Midnight)"—ABBA | Safe |
| Aleksander & Izabela | 37 (9,10,9,9) | Tango | "Voulez-Vous"—ABBA | Safe |
| Beata & Mieszko | 25 (7,7,6,5) | Rumba | "I Have a Dream"—ABBA | Safe |
| Filip & Hanna | 30 (8,9,6,7) | Viennese Waltz | "Andante, Andante"—ABBA | Safe |
| Małgorzata & Kamil | 22 (6,9,4,3) | Tango | "Mamma Mia"—ABBA | Eliminated |
| Julia & Michał | 33 (8,10,8,7) | Cha-cha-cha | "Super Trouper"—ABBA | Safe |
| Maciej & Daria | 34 (8,10,9,7) | Jive | "Waterloo"—ABBA | Safe |
| Dagmara & Marcin | 21 (6,7,4,4) | Tango | "Money, Money, Money"—ABBA | Safe |

=== Week 4: Spring Breakers ===
Running order

| Couple | Score | Dance | Music | Result |
|---|---|---|---|---|
| Aleksander & Izabela | 35 (9,9,9,8) | Cha-cha-cha | "Cold Heart"—Elton John & Dua Lipa | Safe |
| Julia & Michał | 27 (6,8,7,6) | Quickstep | "Wiosna – ach to ty!"—Marek Grechuta | Safe |
| Beata & Mieszko | 22 (5,7,5,5) | Tango | "Italodisco"—The Kolors | Eliminated 1st |
| Maciej & Daria | 32 (7,10,8,7) | Waltz | "You Are So Beautiful"—Joe Cocker | Safe |
| Anita & Jacek | 39 (9,10,10,10) | Paso Doble | "Beggin'"—Måneskin | Safe |
| Kamil & Magdalena | 20 (5,7,4,4) | Foxtrot | "Feeling Good"—Nina Simone | Safe |
| Dagmara & Marcin | 20 (5,6,5,4) | Rumba | "Woman in Love"—Barbra Streisand | Safe |
| Krzysztof & Sara | 39 (10,10,10,9) | Viennese Waltz | "Lose Control'"—Teddy Swims | Bottom three |
| Filip & Hanna | 25 (7,8,6,4) | Jive | "I'm Still Standing"—Elton John | Eliminated 2nd |
| Roxie & Michał | 39 (9,10,10,10) | Waltz | "Moon River"—Audrey Hepburn | Safe |

=== Week 5: Dedications Night ===
Running order

| Couple | Score | Dance | Music | Result |
|---|---|---|---|---|
| Krzysztof & Sara | 31 (7,10,8,6) | Samba | "A far l'amore comincia tu"—Raffaella Carrà | Safe |
| Anita & Jacek | 40 (10,10,10,10) | Foxtrot | "Anybody Seen My Baby?"—The Rolling Stones | Safe |
| Kamil & Magdalena | 25 (6,7,6,6) | Viennese Waltz | "Nothing Else Matters"—Metallica | Eliminated |
| Roxie & Michał | 32 (8,8,9,7) | Jive | "Halo"—Beyoncé | Safe |
| Dagmara & Marcin | 23 (7,8,5,3) | Waltz | "Jej portret"—Bogusław Mec | Bottom two |
| Maciej & Daria | 40 (10,10,10,10) | Contemporary | "Droga mi nie straszna"—Marek Sośnicki | Safe |
| Julia & Michał | 32 (8,8,8,8) | Rumba | "Miłość miłość"—Krzysztof Zalewski | Safe |
| Aleksander & Izabela | 38 (9,10,10,9) | Paso Doble | "Smooth Criminal"—Michael Jackson | Safe |

=== Week 6: Disco Week ===
Running order

| Couple | Score | Dance | Music | Result |
|---|---|---|---|---|
| Dagmara & Marcin | 19 (5,5,5,4) | Paso Doble | "Hi Fi Superstar"—Wanda i Banda | Bottom two |
| Maciej & Daria | 30 (7,9,8,6) | Samba | "Gasolina"—Daddy Yankee | Safe |
| Roxie & Michał | 40 (10,10,10,10) | Contemporary | "Houdini"—Dua Lipa | Safe |
| Aleksander & Izabela | 38 (9,10,10,9) | Samba | "Za daleko"—Mrozu feat. Vito Bambino | Eliminated |
| Anita & Jacek | 35 (8,10,9,8) | Cha-cha-cha | "Get Lucky"—Daft Punk feat. Pharrell Williams | Safe |
| Krzysztof & Sara | 40 (10,10,10,10) | Contemporary | "Someone You Loved"—Lewis Capaldi | Safe |
| Julia & Michał | 35 (9,9,9,8) | Tango | "Murder on the Dancefloor"—Sophie Ellis-Bextor | Safe |

=== Week 7: Music Video Week ===
Running order

| Couple | Score | Dance | Music | Result |
|---|---|---|---|---|
| Julia & Michał | 34 (8,10,9,7) | Paso Doble | "Bad Romance"—Lady Gaga | Safe |
| Julia & Michał | 40 (10,10,10,10) | Waltz | "Hej Wy!"—Kortez | Safe |
| Krzysztof & Sara | 32 (8,10,8,6) | Foxtrot | "Back to Black"—Amy Winehouse | Eliminated |
| Krzysztof & Sara | 30 (8,9,7,6) | Paso Doble | "Wrecking Ball"—Miley Cyrus | Eliminated |
| Anita & Jacek | 39 (10,10,9,10) | Rumba | "November Rain"—Guns N' Roses | Safe |
| Anita & Jacek | 36 (9,9,9,9) | Quickstep | "Single Ladies (Put a Ring on It)"—Beyoncé | Safe |
| Maciej & Daria | 32 (8,9,8,7) | Viennese Waltz | "Don't Give Up"—Peter Gabriel & Kate Bush | Bottom two |
| Maciej & Daria | 37 (10,10,8,9) | Rumba | "Hello"—Adele | Bottom two |
| Roxie & Michał | 40 (10,10,10,10) | Samba | "Shape of You"—Ed Sheeran | Safe |
| Roxie & Michał | 39 (9,10,10,10) | Viennese Waltz | "Słucham Cię w radiu co tydzień"—Anna Karwan | Safe |
| Dagmara & Marcin | 16 (4,5,5,2) | Quickstep | "Forgive Me Friend"—Smith & Thell | Safe |
| Dagmara & Marcin | 7 (2,1,3,1) | Broadway | "Ale jazz!"—Sanah & Vito Bambino | Safe |

=== Week 8: Trio Challenge ===
Running order

| Couple | Score | Dance | Music | Result |
|---|---|---|---|---|
| Roxie & Michał (Kevin Mglej) | 40 (10,10,10,10) | Rumba | "Wicked Game"—Chris Isaak | Safe |
| Roxie & Michał (Kevin Mglej) | 40 (10,10,10,10) | Tango | "I've Seen That Face Before (Libertango)"—Grace Jones | Safe |
| Krzysztof & Sara (Aleksandra Rutkowska) | 35 (9,9,9,8) | Rumba | "Fields of Gold"—Eva Cassidy | Eliminated |
| Krzysztof & Sara (Aleksandra Rutkowska) | 40 (10,10,10,10) | Waltz | "Come Away with Me"—Norah Jones | Eliminated |
| Maciej & Daria (Anna Markiewicz-Musiał) | 35 (8,10,8,9) | Foxtrot | "Baby I'm a Fool" — Melody Gardot | Bottom two |
| Maciej & Daria (Anna Markiewicz-Musiał) | 40 (10,10,10,10) | Jive | "Hit the Road Jack"—Ray Charles | Bottom two |
| Anita & Jacek (Leszek Sokołowski) | 40 (10,10,10,10) | Contemporary | "Belle"—Studio Accantus | Safe |
| Anita & Jacek (Leszek Sokołowski) | 38 (9,9,10,10) | Viennese Waltz | "Love on the Brain"—Rihanna | Safe |
| Julia & Michał (Katarzyna Brzezińska) | 40 (10,10,10,10) | Foxtrot | "Just the Way You Are"—Bruno Mars | Safe |
| Julia & Michał (Katarzyna Brzezińska) | 40 (10,10,10,10) | Salsa | "Conga"—Miami Sound Machine | Safe |
| Dagmara & Marcin (Conan Kaźmierski) | — | Disco | — | Withdrew |
| Dagmara & Marcin (Conan Kaźmierski) | — | Salsa | — | Withdrew |

=== Week 9: Semi-Final ===
Running order

| Couple | Score | Dance | Music | Result |
|---|---|---|---|---|
| Maciej & Daria | 35 (8,10,9,8) | Salsa | "Bailando"—Enrique Iglesias | Eliminated |
| Maciej & Daria | 38 (9,10,10,9) | Quickstep | "Valerie"—Mark Ronson feat. Amy Winehouse | Eliminated |
| Julia & Michał | 36 (9,10,9,8) | Samba | "Don't Go Yet"—Camila Cabello | Safe |
| Julia & Michał | 37 (10,10,9,8) | Charleston | "A Little Party Never Killed Nobody (All We Got)"—Fergie, Q-Tip and GoonRock | Safe |
| Roxie & Michał | 40 (10,10,10,10) | Salsa | "Hips Don't Lie"—Shakira feat. Wyclef Jean | Bottom two |
| Roxie & Michał | 40 (10,10,10,10) | Foxtrot | "Fever"—Peggy Lee | Bottom two |
| Anita & Jacek | 34 (9,9,9,7) | Samba | "Livin' la Vida Loca"—Ricky Martin | Safe |
| Anita & Jacek | 40 (10,10,10,10) | Charleston | "Courtin' Time"—Prince | Safe |

=== Week 10: Season Final ===
Running order

| Couple | Score | Dance | Music | Result |
|---|---|---|---|---|
| Julia & Michał | 40 (10,10,10,10) | Waltz | "Hej Wy!"—Kortez | 3rd place |
| Julia & Michał | 35 (9,9,9,8) | Cha-cha-cha | "I Don't Like It, I Love It"—Flo Rida feat. Robin Thicke and Verdine White | 3rd place |
| Julia & Michał | 40 (10,10,10,10) | Freestyle | "In The End"—Linkin Park | 3rd place |
| Anita & Jacek | 40 (10,10,10,10) | Rumba | "November Rain"—Guns N' Roses | Winners |
| Anita & Jacek | 37 (10,9,9,9) | Quickstep | "Nic do stracenia"—Mrozu & Sound'n'Grace | Winners |
| Anita & Jacek | 40 (10,10,10,10) | Freestyle | "Daylight"—David Kushner | Winners |
| Roxie & Michał | 40 (10,10,10,10) | Paso Doble | "Gimme! Gimme! Gimme! (A Man After Midnight)"—ABBA | Runners-up |
| Roxie & Michał | 39 (9,10,10,10) | Jive | "I'm So Excited"—The Pointer Sisters | Runners-up |
| Roxie & Michał | 40 (10,10,10,10) | Freestyle | "Niech żyje bal"—Maryla Rodowicz | Runners-up |

Other Dances

| Couple | Dance | Music |
|---|---|---|
| Maciej & Daria | Viennese Waltz | "Secondo Waltz"—Dmitri Shostakovich |
| Krzysztof & Sara | Viennese Waltz | "Secondo Waltz"—Dmitri Shostakovich |
| Aleksander & Izabela | Viennese Waltz | "Secondo Waltz"—Dmitri Shostakovich |
| Kamil & Magdalena | Viennese Waltz | "Secondo Waltz"—Dmitri Shostakovich |
| Filip & Hanna | Viennese Waltz | "Secondo Waltz"—Dmitri Shostakovich |
| Beata & Mieszko | Viennese Waltz | "Secondo Waltz"—Dmitri Shostakovich |
| Małgorzata & Kamil | Viennese Waltz | "Secondo Waltz"—Dmitri Shostakovich |
| Adam & Katarzyna | Viennese Waltz | "Secondo Waltz"—Dmitri Shostakovich |

== Dance chart ==
The celebrities and professional partners danced one of these routines for each corresponding week:

- Week 1 (Season Premiere): Cha-cha-cha, Tango, Jive, Paso Doble, Waltz, Viennese Waltz, Rumba
- Week 2 (Movie Week): One unlearned dance (introducing Quickstep)
- Week 3 (ABBA Week): One unlearned dance
- Week 4 (Spring Breakers): One unlearned dance (introducing Foxtrot)
- Week 5 (Dedications Night): One unlearned dance (introducing Samba, Contemporary)
- Week 6 (Disco Week): One unlearned dance
- Week 7 (Music Video Week): Two unlearned dances (introducing Broadway)
- Week 8 (Trio Challenge): Two unlearned dances (introducing Salsa)
  Maciej & Daria: One unlearned dance and one repeated dance
- Week 9 (Semi-Final): Two unlearned dances (introducing Charleston)
- Week 10 (Season Final): Couple's favourite dance of the season, judge's choice and Freestyle

| Couple | 1 | 2 | 3 | 4 | 5 | 6 | 7 | | 8 | | 9 | | 10 | | |
|---|---|---|---|---|---|---|---|---|---|---|---|---|---|---|---|
| Anita & Jacek | Tango | Jive | Waltz | Paso Doble | Foxtrot | Cha-cha-cha | Rumba | Quickstep | Contemporary | Viennese Waltz | Samba | Charleston | Rumba | Quickstep | Freestyle |
| Roxie & Michał | Cha-cha-cha | Quickstep | Paso Doble | Waltz | Jive | Contemporary | Samba | Viennese Waltz | Rumba | Tango | Salsa | Foxtrot | Paso Doble | Jive | Freestyle |
| Julia & Michał | Jive | Viennese Waltz | Cha-cha-cha | Quickstep | Rumba | Tango | Paso Doble | Waltz | Foxtrot | Salsa | Samba | Charleston | Waltz | Cha-cha-cha | Freestyle |
| Maciej & Daria | Cha-cha-cha | Tango | Jive | Waltz | Contemporary | Samba | Viennese Waltz | Rumba | Foxtrot | Jive | Salsa | Quickstep | | | Viennese Waltz |
| Krzysztof & Sara | Jive | Tango | Cha-cha-cha | Viennese Waltz | Samba | Contemporary | Foxtrot | Paso Doble | Rumba | Waltz | | | | | Viennese Waltz |
| Dagmara & Marcin | Viennese Waltz | Cha-cha-cha | Tango | Rumba | Waltz | Paso Doble | Quickstep | Broadway | Disco | Salsa | | | | | |
| Aleksander & Izabela | Viennese Waltz | Jive | Tango | Cha-cha-cha | Paso Doble | Samba | | | | | | | | | Viennese Waltz |
| Kamil & Magdalena | Rumba | Waltz | Jive | Foxtrot | Viennese Waltz | | | | | | | | | | Viennese Waltz |
| Filip & Hanna | Tango | Cha-cha-cha | Viennese Waltz | Jive | | | | | | | | | | | Viennese Waltz |
| Beata & Mieszko | Cha-cha-cha | Waltz | Rumba | Tango | | | | | | | | | | | Viennese Waltz |
| Małgorzata & Kamil | Waltz | Rumba | Tango | | | | | | | | | | | | Viennese Waltz |
| Adam & Katarzyna | Paso Doble | Quickstep | | | | | | | | | | | | | Viennese Waltz |

Highest scoring dance
Lowest scoring dance
Performed, but not scored
Not performed due to withdrawal

== Guest performances ==
| Date | Artist(s) | Song(s) | Dancers |
|---|---|---|---|
| 3 March 2024 | Tomasz Szymuś's Orchestra | "Instruction" | NEXT Group and judges |
| 10 March 2024 | Tomasz Szymuś's Orchestra | "Witajcie w naszej bajce" | All professional dancers |
| 17 March 2024 | Tomasz Szymuś's Orchestra | "Dancing Queen" | NEXT Group |
| 24 March 2024 | Tomasz Szymuś's Orchestra | "Spring" from "The Four Seasons" | NEXT Group |
| 31 March 2024 | Ray Dalton | "All We Got" | NEXT Group |
| 31 March 2024 | Ray Dalton | "Do It Again" | NEXT Group |
| 31 March 2024 | Marcin Wyrostek | "El Tango de Roxanne" | Anna Głogowska, Rafał Maserak, Tomasz Barański |
| 7 April 2024 | Tim Kamrad | "I Believe" | NEXT Group |
| 14 April 2024 | Nick Sinckler | "Billie Jean" | JDC Dance Group |
| 14 April 2024 | Nick Sinckler | "I Don't Wanna Miss a Thing" | Ocelot Acrobatic Group |
| 21 April 2024 | Sara James | "It's Your Thing" | JDC Dance Group |
| 28 April 2024 | Tomasz Szymuś's Orchestra | "Samba de Janeiro" | Carnival Stars Group |
| 5 May 2024 | Jimmie Wilson | "Dancing on the Ceiling" | NEXT Group and all eliminated couples |
| 5 May 2024 | Tribbs & Kubańczyk | "Ostatni raz zatańczysz ze mną" | NEXT Group |

== Rating figures ==
| Date | Episode | Official rating 4+ | Share 4+ | Official rating 16–49 | Share 16–49 | Official rating 16–59 | Share 16–59 |
|---|---|---|---|---|---|---|---|
| 3 March 2024 | 1 | 1 894 094 | 14,64% | 512 114 | 11,29% | 791 414 | 11,55% |
| 10 March 2024 | 2 | 1 868 253 | 14,72% | 593 804 | 13,30% | 831 784 | 12,39% |
| 17 March 2024 | 3 | 1 861 462 | 14,40% | 542 121 | 12,11% | 831 877 | 12,44% |
| 24 March 2024 | 4 | 1 892 267 | 15,11% | 596 625 | 13,94% | 849 670 | 13,27% |
| 31 March 2024 | 5 | 1 441 137 | 11,96% | 359 800 | 8,59% | 572 614 | 9,16% |
| 7 April 2024 | 6 | 1 457 566 | 11,47% | 407 865 | 9,69% | 611 798 | 9,49% |
| 14 April 2024 | 7 | 1 872 912 | 14,60% | 548 159 | 12,21% | 837 994 | 12,49% |
| 21 April 2024 | 8 | 1 807 948 | 13,32% | 495 891 | 10,22% | 767 615 | 10,70% |
| 28 April 2024 | 9 | 1 673 145 | 13,63% | 488 181 | 12,13% | 689 398 | 11,26% |
| 5 May 2024 | 10 | 1 937 399 | 15,65% | 601 544 | 14,10% | 876 197 | 13,68% |
| Average | Spring 2024 | 1 784 502 | 14,06% | 520 273 | 11,86% | 773 963 | 11,75% |
