= List of number-one singles of 2025 (Poland) =

This is a list of the songs that reached number-one position in official Polish single charts in 2025:

- OLiA (official airplay chart), published by ZPAV
- OLiS – streaming singles, published by ZPAV
- Poland Songs, published by Billboard (as a part of Hits of the World)

== Chart history ==
OLiA – airplay singles			OLiS – streaming singles			Billboard Poland Songs			
Issue date (Note: Last day of week covered by the chart (Saturday to Friday). The chart is published next Monday.)	Song	Artist(s)	Issue date (Note: Last day of week covered by the chart (Friday to Thursday). The chart is published next Thursday.)	Song	Artist(s)	Issue date (Note: Issue date by Billboard (Saturday). The chart covers week starting 15 days earlier (Friday to Thursday).)	Song	Artist(s)	Ref.
						January 4	"Last Christmas"	Wham!	
January 3	"Apt."	Rosé and Bruno Mars	January 2	"Kochasz?"	Sobel	January 11	"Kochasz?"	Sobel	
January 10	"Apt."	Rosé and Bruno Mars	January 9	"Dom nad wodą"	Pezet	January 18	"Kochasz?"	Sobel	
January 17	"Apt."	Rosé and Bruno Mars	January 16	"Dom nad wodą"	Pezet	January 25	"Dom nad wodą"	Pezet	
January 24	"Apt."	Rosé and Bruno Mars	January 23	"Dom nad wodą"	Pezet	February 1	"Dom nad wodą"	Pezet	
January 31	"Ballada o niej"	Daria Zawiałow	January 30	"Up! Up! Up!"	Mata	February 8	"Up! Up! Up!"	Mata	
February 7	"Walk with Me"	Felix Jaehn and Shouse	February 6	"Up! Up! Up!"	Mata	February 15	"Up! Up! Up!"	Mata	
February 14	"Walk with Me"	Felix Jaehn and Shouse	February 13	"Kierownik"	Kizo	February 22	"Kierownik"	Kizo	
February 21	"Pięknie płyniesz"	Dawid Podsiadło	February 20	"Dom nad wodą"	Pezet	March 1	"Dom nad wodą"	Pezet	
February 28	"Pięknie płyniesz"	Dawid Podsiadło	February 27	"Dom nad wodą"	Pezet	March 8	"Dom nad wodą"	Pezet	
March 7	"Walk with Me"	Felix Jaehn and Shouse	March 6	"Dom nad wodą"	Pezet	March 15	"Dom nad wodą"	Pezet	
March 14	"Walk with Me"	Felix Jaehn and Shouse	March 13	"Dom nad wodą"	Pezet	March 22	"Dom nad wodą"	Pezet	
March 21	"Co noc"	Oskar Cyms	March 20	"Evil J0rdan"	Playboi Carti	March 29	"Evil J0rdan"	Playboi Carti	
March 28	"Abracadabra"	Lady Gaga	March 27	"Dom nad wodą"	Pezet	April 5	"Dom nad wodą"	Pezet	
April 4	"Dancing in Love"	Alan Walker and Meek	April 3	"Dom nad wodą"	Pezet	April 12	"Dom nad wodą"	Pezet	
April 11	"Abracadabra"	Lady Gaga	April 10	"Dom nad wodą"	Pezet	April 19	"Dom nad wodą"	Pezet	
April 18	"Abracadabra"	Lady Gaga	April 17	"Dom nad wodą"	Pezet	April 26	"Dom nad wodą"	Pezet	
April 25	"Next Summer"	Damiano David	April 24	"Dom nad wodą"	Pezet	May 3	"Dom nad wodą"	Pezet	
May 2	"Next Summer"	Damiano David	May 1	"Cha cha"	Sobel	May 10	"Cha cha"	Sobel	
May 9	"Next Summer"	Damiano David	May 8	"Cha cha"	Sobel	May 17	"Cha cha"	Sobel	
May 16	"Tamo Bien"	Enrique Iglesias, Pitbull and IAmChino	May 15	"Cha cha"	Sobel	May 24	"Casablanca"	Sentino and BNP	
May 23	"Azizam"	Ed Sheeran	May 22	"Casablanca"	Sentino and BNP	May 31	"Casablanca"	Sentino and BNP	
May 30	"Azizam"	Ed Sheeran	May 29	"Casablanca"	Sentino and BNP	June 7	"Casablanca"	Sentino and BNP	
June 6	"Azizam"	Ed Sheeran	June 5	"Casablanca"	Sentino and BNP	June 14	"Casablanca"	Sentino and BNP	
June 13	"Ordinary"	Alex Warren	June 12	"Casablanca"	Sentino and BNP	June 21	"Casablanca"	Sentino and BNP	
June 20	"Ordinary"	Alex Warren	June 19	"Santa Cruz"	Modelki, Qry, Wersow, Świeży and Mortal	June 28	"Santa Cruz"	Modelki, Qry, Wersow, Świeży and Mortal	
June 27	"Ordinary"	Alex Warren	June 26	"Santa Cruz"	Modelki, Qry, Wersow, Świeży and Mortal	July 5	"Santa Cruz"	Modelki, Qry, Wersow, Świeży and Mortal	
July 4	"Azizam"	Ed Sheeran	July 3	"Santa Cruz"	Modelki, Qry, Wersow, Świeży and Mortal	July 12	"Santa Cruz"	Modelki, Qry, Wersow, Świeży and Mortal	
July 11	"Nie mówię tak, nie mówię nie"	Wiktor Dyduła and Kasia Sienkiewicz	July 10	"Tak to lata"	Bungee and Tuszol	July 19	"Tak to lata"	Bungee and Tuszol	
July 18	"Oj, dziewczyno!"	Wiktoria Kida and Księga Żywiołów	July 17	"Tak to lata"	Bungee and Tuszol	July 26	"Tak to lata"	Bungee and Tuszol	
July 25	"Oj, dziewczyno!"	Wiktoria Kida and Księga Żywiołów	July 24	"Tak to lata"	Bungee and Tuszol	August 2	"Tak to lata"	Bungee and Tuszol	
August 1	"Zombie Lady"	Damiano David	July 31	"Tak to lata"	Bungee and Tuszol	August 9	"Tak to lata"	Bungee and Tuszol	
August 8	"Kyoto"	Kuban featuring Zalia	August 7	"Tak to lata"	Bungee and Tuszol	August 16	"Tak to lata"	Bungee and Tuszol	
August 15	"Kyoto"	Kuban featuring Zalia	August 14	"Tak to lata"	Bungee and Tuszol	August 23	"Dopóki się nie znudzisz"	Miü featuring Zalia	
August 22	"Zombie Lady"	Damiano David	August 21	"Dopóki się nie znudzisz"	Miü featuring Zalia	August 30	"Dopóki się nie znudzisz"	Miü featuring Zalia	
August 29	"Zombie Lady"	Damiano David	August 28	"Kamikaze"	Mata featuring Skolim and Khaid	September 6	"Kamikaze"	Mata featuring Skolim and Khaid	
September 5	"Wait So Long"	Swedish House Mafia	September 4	"Kamikaze"	Mata featuring Skolim and Khaid	September 13	"Kamikaze"	Mata featuring Skolim and Khaid	
September 12	"Wait So Long"	Swedish House Mafia	September 11	"Dopóki się nie znudzisz"	Miü featuring Zalia	September 20	"Dopóki się nie znudzisz"	Miü featuring Zalia	
September 19	"Wait So Long"	Swedish House Mafia	September 18	"Dopóki się nie znudzisz"	Miü featuring Zalia	September 27	"Dopóki się nie znudzisz"	Miü featuring Zalia	
September 26	"Wait So Long"	Swedish House Mafia	September 25	"Dopóki się nie znudzisz"	Miü featuring Zalia	October 4	"Dopóki się nie znudzisz"	Miü featuring Zalia	
October 3	"Wait So Long"	Swedish House Mafia	October 2	"Dopóki się nie znudzisz"	Miü featuring Zalia	October 11	"Dopóki się nie znudzisz"	Miü featuring Zalia	
October 10	"Wait So Long"	Swedish House Mafia	October 9	"Dopóki się nie znudzisz"	Miü featuring Zalia	October 18	"Fiku Miku"	Bungee	
October 17	"Zabiorę cię tam"	Fukaj featuring Vito Bambino	October 16	"Fiku Miku"	Bungee	October 25	"Fiku Miku"	Bungee	
October 24	"Zabiorę cię tam"	Fukaj featuring Vito Bambino	October 23	"Dopóki się nie znudzisz"	Miü featuring Zalia	November 1	"Dopóki się nie znudzisz"	Miü featuring Zalia	
October 31	"Zabiorę cię tam"	Fukaj featuring Vito Bambino	October 30	"Dopóki się nie znudzisz"	Miü featuring Zalia	November 8	"Dopóki się nie znudzisz"	Miü featuring Zalia	
November 7	"Zabiorę cię tam"	Fukaj featuring Vito Bambino	November 6	"Dopóki się nie znudzisz"	Miü featuring Zalia	November 15	"Dopóki się nie znudzisz"	Miü featuring Zalia	
November 14	"Zabiorę cię tam"	Fukaj featuring Vito Bambino	November 13	"Dopóki się nie znudzisz"	Miü featuring Zalia	November 22	"Dopóki się nie znudzisz"	Miü featuring Zalia	
November 21	"Zabiorę cię tam"	Fukaj featuring Vito Bambino	November 20	"Dopóki się nie znudzisz"	Miü featuring Zalia	November 29	"Dopóki się nie znudzisz"	Miü featuring Zalia	
November 28	"The Fate of Ophelia"	Taylor Swift	November 27	"Dopóki się nie znudzisz"	Miü featuring Zalia	December 6	"Dopóki się nie znudzisz"	Miü featuring Zalia	
December 5	"The Fate of Ophelia"	Taylor Swift	December 4	"Kamień z serca"	Bedoes and Kubi Producent	December 13	"Kamień z serca"	Bedoes and Kubi Producent	
December 12	"Zabiorę cię tam"	Fukaj featuring Vito Bambino	December 11	"Kamień z serca"	Bedoes and Kubi Producent	December 20	"Kamień z serca"	Bedoes and Kubi Producent	
December 19	"The Fate of Ophelia"	Taylor Swift	December 18	"Last Christmas"	Wham!	December 27	"Last Christmas"	Wham!	
December 26	"Turn the Lights Off"	Justė, Jaxstyle and Jon	December 25	"Last Christmas"	Wham!				

== Number-one artists ==
=== OLiA ===
List of number-one artists by total weeks at number one
Artist	Weeks at No. 1
Fukaj	7
Vito Bambino	7
Damiano David	6
Swedish House Mafia	6
Rosé	4
Bruno Mars	4
Felix Jaehn	4
Shouse	4
Ed Sheeran	4
Lady Gaga	3
Alex Warren	3
Taylor Swift	3
Dawid Podsiadło	2
Wiktoria Kida	2
Księga Żywiołów	2
Kuban	2
Zalia	2
Daria Zawiałow	1
Oskar Cyms	1
Alan Walker	1
Meek	1
Enrique Iglesias	1
Pitbull	1
IAmChino	1
Wiktor Dyduła	1
Kasia Sienkiewicz	1
Justė	1
Jaxstyle	1
Jon	1

=== OLiS – streaming chart ===
List of number-one artists by total weeks at number one
Artist	Weeks at No. 1
Pezet	12
Miü	12
Zalia	12
Bungee	7
Tuszol	6
Sobel	4
Sentino	4
BNP	4
Mata	4
Modelki	3
Qry	3
Wersow	3
Świeży	3
Mortal	3
Skolim	2
Khaid	2
Bedoes	2
Kubi Producent	2
Wham!	2
Kizo	1
Playboi Carti	1

=== Billboard Poland Songs ===
List of number-one artists by total weeks at number one
Artist	Weeks at No. 1
Miü	12
Zalia	12
Pezet	11
Bungee	7
Sentino	5
BNP	5
Tuszol	5
Sobel	4
Mata	4
Modelki	3
Qry	3
Wersow	3
Świeży	3
Mortal	3
Skolim	2
Khaid	2
Bedoes	2
Kubi Producent	2
Wham!	2
Kizo	1
Playboi Carti	1

== See also ==
- Polish music charts
- List of number-one albums of 2025 (Poland)
