= List of number-one albums of 2004 (Poland) =

These are the Polish number one albums of 2004, per the OLiS Chart.

== Chart history ==
Issue Date	Album	Artist(s)	Reference(s)
January 5	Nieprzyzwoite piosenki	Anita Lipnicka & John Porter	
January 12	Nieprzyzwoite piosenki	Anita Lipnicka & John Porter	
January 19	Nieprzyzwoite piosenki	Anita Lipnicka & John Porter	
January 26	Nieprzyzwoite piosenki	Anita Lipnicka & John Porter	
February 2	Nieprzyzwoite piosenki	Anita Lipnicka & John Porter	
February 9	Złota kolekcja (Czas jak rzeka)	Czesław Niemen	
February 16	Złota kolekcja (Czas jak rzeka)	Czesław Niemen	
February 23	Feels Like Home	Norah Jones	
March 1	Feels Like Home	Norah Jones	
March 8	Samotność po zmierzchu	Ania	
March 15	Samotność po zmierzchu	Ania	
March 22	Samotność po zmierzchu	Ania	
March 29	Patience	George Michael	
April 5	Patience	George Michael	
April 13	Znaki szczególne	Maanam	
April 19	Samotność po zmierzchu	Ania	
April 26	Wideoteka	Jeden Osiem L	
May 4	The Girl in the Other Room	Diana Krall	
May 10	Kabaret TEY Vol. 2: Ciąg dalszy	Kabaret TEY	
May 17	Kabaret TEY Vol. 2: Ciąg dalszy	Kabaret TEY	
May 24	Kabaret TEY Vol. 2: Ciąg dalszy	Kabaret TEY	
May 31	Bimbo	Virgin	
June 7	Siła sióstr	Sistars	
June 14	Siła sióstr	Sistars	
June 21	Siła sióstr	Sistars	
June 28	Radio ZET: Tylko wielkie przeboje na lato	Różni wykonawcy	
July 5	Radio ZET: Tylko wielkie przeboje na lato	Różni wykonawcy	
July 12	Radio ZET: Tylko wielkie przeboje na lato	Różni wykonawcy	
July 19	Radio ZET: Tylko wielkie przeboje na lato	Różni wykonawcy	
July 26	Radio ZET: Tylko wielkie przeboje na lato	Różni wykonawcy	
August 2	Radio ZET: Tylko wielkie przeboje na lato	Różni wykonawcy	
August 9	Radio ZET: Tylko wielkie przeboje na lato	Różni wykonawcy	
August 16	To co w życiu ważne	Krzysztof Krawczyk	
August 23	To co w życiu ważne	Krzysztof Krawczyk	
August 30	To co w życiu ważne	Krzysztof Krawczyk	
September 6	To co w życiu ważne	Krzysztof Krawczyk	
September 13	To co w życiu ważne	Krzysztof Krawczyk	
September 20	To co w życiu ważne	Krzysztof Krawczyk	
September 27	Samotna w wielkim mieście	Kasia Kowalska	
October 4	Samotna w wielkim mieście	Kasia Kowalska	
October 11	Czterdziesty pierwszy	Kazik	
October 18	Czterdziesty pierwszy	Kazik	
October 25	Czterdziesty pierwszy	Kazik	
November 2	Czterdziesty pierwszy	Kazik	
November 8	Dear Heather	Leonard Cohen	
November 15	Watra	Wilki	
November 22	Watra	Wilki	
November 29	How to Dismantle an Atomic Bomb	U2	
December 6	How to Dismantle an Atomic Bomb	U2	
December 13	Bravo Hits Zima 2005	Różni wykonawcy	
December 20	Bravo Hits Zima 2005	Różni wykonawcy	
December 27	Bravo Hits Zima 2005	Różni wykonawcy	
