= List of number-one albums of 2008 (Poland) =

These are the Polish number one albums of 2008, per the OLiS Chart.

== Chart history ==
Issue Date	Album	Artist(s)	Reference(s)
January 14	Feel	Feel	
January 21	Feel	Feel	
January 28	Feel	Feel	
February 4	Feel	Feel	
February 11	The Best Love... Ever!	Różni wykonawcy	
February 18	The Best Love... Ever!	Różni wykonawcy	
February 25	The Best Love... Ever!	Różni wykonawcy	
March 3	Ja tu tylko sprzątam	O.S.T.R.	
March 10	Ja tu tylko sprzątam	O.S.T.R.	
March 17	Feel	Feel	
March 25	Oratorium dla świata – Habitat cz. 1	Piotr Rubik	
March 31	Feel	Feel	
April 7	Feel	Feel	
April 14	Feel	Feel	
April 21	Feel	Feel	
April 28	Feel	Feel	
May 5	Feel	Feel	
May 12	Hard Candy	Madonna	
May 19	Feel	Feel	
May 26	Feel	Feel	
June 2	Feel	Feel	
June 9	The Best Kids... Ever!	Różni wykonawcy	
June 16	Feel	Feel	
June 23	Feel	Feel	
June 30	W spodniach czy w sukience?	Ania	
July 7	W spodniach czy w sukience?	Ania	
July 14	Feel	Feel	
July 21	Feel	Feel	
July 28	Feel	Feel	
August 4	Feel	Feel	
August 11	Chant - Music for Paradise	The Cistercian Monks of Stift Heiligenkreuz	
August 18	Feel	Feel	
August 25	Feel	Feel	
September 1	Feel	Feel	
September 8	Mamma Mia!	Muzyka filmowa	
September 15	Mamma Mia!	Muzyka filmowa	
September 22	Death Magnetic	Metallica	
September 29	Death Magnetic	Metallica	
October 6	Maria Awaria	Maria Peszek	
October 13	Death Magnetic	Metallica	
October 20	Mamma Mia!	Muzyka filmowa	
October 27	Mamma Mia!	Muzyka filmowa	
November 3	Black Ice	AC/DC	
November 10	Mamma Mia!	Muzyka filmowa	
November 17	Mamma Mia!	Muzyka filmowa	
November 24	Hipertrofia	Coma	
December 1	Hipertrofia	Coma	
December 8	Chinese Democracy	Guns N' Roses	
December 15	Osiecka	Kasia Nosowska	
December 22	Osiecka	Kasia Nosowska	
