= List of number-one albums of 2006 (Poland) =

These are the Polish number one albums of 2006, per the OLiS Chart.

== Chart history ==
Issue Date	Album	Artist(s)	Reference(s)
January 2	Poligono Industrial	Kult	
January 9	Poligono Industrial	Kult	
January 16	Poligono Industrial	Kult	
January 23	Poligono Industrial	Kult	
January 30	Poligono Industrial	Kult	
February 6	Tylko mnie kochaj	Muzyka filmowa	
February 13	Tylko mnie kochaj	Muzyka filmowa	
February 20	Tylko mnie kochaj	Muzyka filmowa	
February 27	Tylko mnie kochaj	Muzyka filmowa	
March 6	Tylko mnie kochaj	Muzyka filmowa	
March 13	Tylko mnie kochaj	Muzyka filmowa	
March 20	On an Island	David Gilmour	
March 27	Rubikon	Piotr Rubik	
April 3	Rubikon	Piotr Rubik	
April 10	Rubikon	Piotr Rubik	
April 18	Rubikon	Piotr Rubik	
April 24	Rubikon	Piotr Rubik	
May 1	Rubikon	Piotr Rubik	
May 15	10000 Days	Tool	
May 22	Stadium Arcadium	Red Hot Chili Peppers	
May 29	Happiness Is Easy	Myslovitz	
June 5	Happiness Is Easy	Myslovitz	
June 12	Zaprzepaszczone siły wielkiej armii świętych znaków	Coma	
June 19	Zaprzepaszczone siły wielkiej armii świętych znaków	Coma	
June 26	The Best Smooth Jazz... Ever! vol. 3	Różni wykonawcy	
July 3	Radio ZET Przeboje na lato 2006	Różni wykonawcy	
July 10	Radio ZET Przeboje na lato 2006	Różni wykonawcy	
July 17	Radio ZET Przeboje na lato 2006	Różni wykonawcy	
July 24	Radio ZET Przeboje na lato 2006	Różni wykonawcy	
July 31	Ficca	Virgin	
August 7	Ficca	Virgin	
August 14	Ficca	Virgin	
August 21	Ficca	Virgin	
August 28	Ficca	Virgin	
September 4	Ficca	Virgin	
September 11	A Matter of Life and Death	Iron Maiden	
September 18	Piece by Piece	Katie Melua	
September 25	Taniec z gwiazdami	Orkiestra Adama Sztaby	
October 2	Piece by Piece	Katie Melua	
October 9	Piece by Piece	Katie Melua	
October 16	Piece by Piece	Katie Melua	
October 23	Rubikon	Piotr Rubik	
October 30	Kilka historii na ten sam temat	Ania	
November 6	Psałterz Wrześniowy	Zbigniew Książek, Piotr Rubik	
November 13	Psałterz Wrześniowy	Zbigniew Książek, Piotr Rubik	
November 20	Psałterz Wrześniowy	Zbigniew Książek, Piotr Rubik	
November 27	Psałterz Wrześniowy	Zbigniew Książek, Piotr Rubik	
December 4	Psałterz Wrześniowy	Zbigniew Książek, Piotr Rubik	
December 11	Psałterz Wrześniowy	Zbigniew Książek, Piotr Rubik	
December 18	Psałterz Wrześniowy	Zbigniew Książek, Piotr Rubik	
December 27	Psałterz Wrześniowy	Zbigniew Książek, Piotr Rubik	
