= List of number-one albums of 2013 (Poland) =

This is a list of the number-one albums of 2013 in Poland, per the OLiS chart.

== Chart history ==
Issue date	Album	Artist(s)	Reference
7 January	Boso	Zakopower	
14 January	Równonoc. Słowiańska dusza	Donatan	
21 January	Równonoc. Słowiańska dusza	Donatan	
28 January	To co dobre	Andrzej Piaseczny	
4 February	Symfonicznie	Lady Pank	
11 February	Symfonicznie	Lady Pank	
18 February	Marek Sierocki Przedstawia: I Love Ballads	Various artists	
25 February	Marek Sierocki Przedstawia: I Love Ballads	Various artists	
4 March	!TO!	Strachy na Lachy	
11 March	Haos	O.S.T.R. and Hades	
18 March	Haos	O.S.T.R. and Hades	
25 March	The Next Day	David Bowie	
2 April	Delta Machine	Depeche Mode	
8 April	Delta Machine	Depeche Mode	
15 April	The Greatest Hits	Il Divo	
22 April	The Greatest Hits	Il Divo	
29 April	Złota kolekcja: Bal u Posejdona	Anna German	
13 May	Złota kolekcja: Bal u Posejdona	Anna German	
20 May	Złota kolekcja: Bal u Posejdona	Anna German	
27 May	Prosto	Kult	
3 June	40 piosenek Anny German	Anna German	
10 June	Comfort and Happiness	Dawid Podsiadło	
17 June	Marek Sierocki Przedstawia: I Love Italia	Various artists	
24 June	Marek Sierocki Przedstawia: I Love Italia	Various artists	
1 July	Marek Sierocki Przedstawia: I Love France	Various artists	
8 July	Marek Sierocki Przedstawia: I Love France	Various artists	
15 July	RMF Styl Volume 2	Various artists	
22 July	RMF Styl Volume 2	Various artists	
29 July	Old Ideas	Leonard Cohen	
5 August	Old Ideas	Leonard Cohen	
12 August	Marek Sierocki Przedstawia: I Love Latino	Various artists	
19 August	Marek Sierocki Przedstawia: I Love Latino	Various artists	
26 August	Siesta 8 – Muzyka Świata & Stare Radio – Prezentuje Marcin Kydryński	Various artists	
2 September	Siesta 8 – Muzyka Świata & Stare Radio – Prezentuje Marcin Kydryński	Various artists	
9 September	W spodniach czy w sukience?	Ania	
16 September	W spodniach czy w sukience?	Ania	
23 September	The Time	Możdżer Danielsson Fresco	
30 September	The Time	Możdżer Danielsson Fresco	
7 October	The Last Ship	Sting	
14 October	Renovatio	Edyta Bartosiewicz	
21 October	Marek Sierocki Przedstawia: I Love 80's	Various artists	
28 October	Marek Sierocki Przedstawia: I Love 80's	Various artists	
4 November	Perfect	Perfect	
12 November	Perfect	Perfect	
18 November	Violetta: Hoy somos más	Various artists	
25 November	Imperium	Hunter	
2 December	9893	Dawid Kwiatkowski	
9 December	Jestem...	Bednarek	
16 December	Jestem...	Bednarek	
23 December	Czarna biała magia	Sokół and Marysia Starosta	
