= List of number-one albums of 2016 (Poland) =

This is a list of number-one albums of 2016 in Poland, per the OLiS chart.

== Chart history ==
Issue date	Album	Artist(s)	Reference
7 January	25	Adele	
14 January	Twenty Five	George Michael	
21 January	Blackstar	David Bowie	
28 January	Beyoncé	Beyoncé	
4 February	Jump Back: The Best of The Rolling Stones	The Rolling Stones	
11 February	Król Albanii	Popek and Matheo	
18 February	Mówi	Małpa	
25 February	Ułamek tarcia	Kaliber 44	
3 March	Atramentowa... Suplement	Stanisława Celińska	
10 March	Życie po śmierci	O.S.T.R.	
17 March	Dla naiwnych marzycieli	Ania Dąbrowska	
24 March	Życie po śmierci	O.S.T.R.	
31 March	Złota kolekcja: Czas jak rzeka	Czesław Niemen	
7 April	Życie po śmierci	O.S.T.R.	
14 April	Hity na czasie: Wiosna 2016	Various artists	
21 April	1985	Rasmentalism	
28 April	How Big, How Blue, How Beautiful	Florence and the Machine	
5 May	Krime Story	Kali	
12 May	Jazz & The City (Platinum Edition)	Various artists	
19 May	Jazz & The City (Platinum Edition)	Various artists	
26 May	Clashes	Brodka	
2 June	Duety. Tak młodo jak teraz	Magda Umer	
9 June	Kocham życie	Dudek P56	
16 June	Złota kolekcja: Czas jak rzeka	Czesław Niemen	
23 June	Bravo Hits: Lato 2016	Various artists	
30 June	Złota kolekcja: Złoty paw	Dżem	
7 July	Złota kolekcja: Złoty paw	Dżem	
14 July	Byle być sobą	Michał Szpak	
21 July	Byle być sobą	Michał Szpak	
28 July	The Ultimate Collection	Sade	
4 August	The Ultimate Collection	Sade	
11 August	Marek Sierocki przedstawia: I Love France Vol. 1	Various artists	
18 August	Marek Sierocki przedstawia: I Love France Vol. 1	Various artists	
25 August	Niepowstrzymany	Gimpson	
1 September	Greatest Hits	Guns N' Roses	
8 September	H8M4	Białas	
14 September	Back to Black	Amy Winehouse	
22 September	Pamiętajmy o Osieckiej. Kolekcja Okularników	Various artists	
29 September	Trzecie rzeczy	KęKę	
6 October	Trzecie rzeczy	KęKę	
13 October	Forever Child	Agnieszka Chylińska	
20 October	Forever Child	Agnieszka Chylińska	
27 October	Wstyd	Kult	
3 November	Drony	Fisz Emade Tworzywo	
10 November	Forever Child	Agnieszka Chylińska	
17 November	Ała.	Ten Typ Mes	
24 November	You Want It Darker	Leonard Cohen	
1 December	Hardwired... to Self-Destruct	Metallica	
8 December	Ostatni krzyk osiedla	Paluch	
15 December	Keptn'	Tede and Sir Michu	
22 December	Hardwired... to Self-Destruct	Metallica	
29 December	Hardwired... to Self-Destruct	Metallica	

== See also ==
- List of number-one singles of 2016 (Poland)
