= Bawię się świetnie =

Studio album by Ania
- Released: 19 October 2012
- Genre: Pop
- Length: 38:57
- Label: Jazzboy Records

Ania chronology
Ania Movie (2010)	Bawię się świetnie (2012)

Bawię się świetnie is the fifth studio album by Polish singer Ania, released in 2012.

== Background ==
The album, whose title translates I'm Having Great Fun, was a departure from Ania's trademark retro style. Lyrics, written by Ania herself, were more introvertive, referencing the singer's state of mind as a 30-year-old woman.

Bawię się świetnie reached #2 in Polish albums chart and was Ania's first not to become a #1 album. However, it went Platinum for shifting more than 40,000 copies in Poland.

== Track listing ==
1. "Nadziejka" - 5:35
2. "Bawię się świetnie" - 3:47
3. "Sublokatorka" - 4:00
4. "Bez cienia nadziei" - 2:04
5. "Dorosłość oddać musisz albo niepewność" - 4:06
6. "Jej zapach" - 3:11
7. "Przy sąsiednim stoliku" - 3:05
8. "Na oślep" - 4:35
9. "Jeszcze ten jeden raz" - 4:00
10. "Kiedyś mi powiesz kim chcesz być" - 4:34

== Singles ==
- 2012: "Bawię się świetnie"
- 2012: "Kiedyś mi powiesz kim chcesz być"
- 2013: "Jeszcze ten jeden raz"
