= Ania Movie =

Studio album by Ania
- Released: 2 April 2010
- Recorded: 2009–2010
- Genre: Pop
- Length: 40:11
- Label: Sony BMG
- Producer: Kuba Galiński

Ania chronology
W spodniach czy w sukience? (2008)	Ania Movie (2010)	Bawię się świetnie (2012)

Ania Movie is the fourth studio album by Polish singer Ania, released in 2010.

== Background ==
The album consists of cover versions of Ania's favourite movie and TV series themes, including music from MASH, About a Boy, Across 110th Street or Deep Throat II. The album was officially confirmed as the last retro-oriented record in Ania's discography. Ania Movie was initially to be released on 22 March, but due to technical problems the date was postponed.

It debuted at #1 position in Polish albums chart and went Platinum in Poland. The album was promoted by Ania Movie Tour.

== Track listing ==
1. "Bang Bang (My Baby Shot Me Down)" (Sonny Bono) - 3:38
2. "Everybody's Talkin'" (Fred Neil) - 3:44
3. "Give Me Your Love" (Curtis Mayfield) - 3:22
4. "Across 110th Street" (Bobby Womack, Peace) - 3:55
5. "Suicide Is Painless" (Mike Altman, Johnny Mandel) - 2:57
6. "Silent Sigh" (Badly Drawn Boy) - 8:22
7. "Strawberry Fields Forever" (John Lennon, Paul McCartney) - 5:08
8. "Deeper and Deeper" (Tony Bruno) - 4:18
9. "Sound of Silence" (Paul Simon) - 4:47

== Singles ==
- 2010: "Driving All Around"
- 2010: "Suicide Is Painless"
- 2010: "Bang Bang"
- 2010: "Silent Sigh"
