= List of number-one dance singles of 2013 (Poland) =

This is a list of the number-one singles on the Polish Top – Dyskoteki chart in 2013, ranking the most-played songs in nightclubs across Poland. It was compiled by DJ Promotion and published by the Polish Society of the Phonographic Industry (ZPAV). The chart was published on a biweekly basis, with the exception of the first two weeks of the year when no data was published at all.

== List of number ones ==
Issue date	Song	Artist(s)	Source
January 15	"Feel This Moment"	Pitbull featuring Christina Aguilera	
February 1	"I Follow Rivers"	Lykke Li	
February 15	"Feel This Moment"	Pitbull featuring Christina Aguilera	
March 1	"Feel This Moment"	Pitbull featuring Christina Aguilera	
March 15	"Feel This Moment"	Pitbull featuring Christina Aguilera	
April 1	"Feel This Moment"	Pitbull featuring Christina Aguilera	
April 16	"Feel This Moment"	Pitbull featuring Christina Aguilera	
May 1	"Feel This Moment"	Pitbull featuring Christina Aguilera	
May 16	"Feel This Moment"	Pitbull featuring Christina Aguilera	
June 1	"More than Friends"	Inna featuring Daddy Yankee	
June 16	"More than Friends"	Inna featuring Daddy Yankee	
July 1	"More than Friends"	Inna featuring Daddy Yankee	
July 16	"Get Lucky"	Daft Punk featuring Pharrell Williams	
August 1	"Blurred Lines"	Robin Thicke featuring T.I. and Pharrell Williams	
August 16	"Holidays"	Remady & Manu-L	
September 1	"Get Lucky"	Daft Punk featuring Pharrell Williams	
September 16	"Blurred Lines"	Robin Thicke featuring T.I. and Pharrell Williams	
October 1	"Wake Me Up!"	Avicii featuring Aloe Blacc	
October 16	"Wake Me Up!"	Avicii featuring Aloe Blacc	
November 1	"Bałkanica"	Piersi	
November 16	"Bałkanica"	Piersi	
December 1	"Bałkanica"	Piersi	
December 16	"Bałkanica"	Piersi	

== See also ==
- List of number-one singles of 2013 (Poland)
- List of number-one albums of 2013 (Poland)
