= List of number-one albums of 2025 (Poland) =

This is a list of number-one albums of 2025 in Poland, per the OLiS chart.

== Chart history ==
Issue date	Albums		Physical albums		Streaming albums		Ref.
Issue date	Album	Artist(s)	Album	Artist(s)	Album	Artist(s)	Ref.
January 2	Art Brut 1 Remixed	PRO8L3M	Art Brut 1 Remixed	PRO8L3M	Merry Christmas	Mariah Carey	
January 9	Kiedy mówi do mnie wiatr	Pih and DJ Creon	Kiedy mówi do mnie wiatr	Pih and DJ Creon	Hit Me Hard and Soft	Billie Eilish	
January 16	Prophet Ilja	Patriarkh	Prophet Ilja	Patriarkh	Hit Me Hard and Soft	Billie Eilish	
January 23	Hit Me Hard and Soft	Billie Eilish	The Human Fear	Franz Ferdinand	Debí Tirar Más Fotos	Bad Bunny	
January 30	Muzyka końca świata	Kartky	Muzyka końca świata	Kartky	Debí Tirar Más Fotos	Bad Bunny	
February 6	Rockst4r	White 2115	Rockst4r	White 2115	Rockst4r	White 2115	
February 13	Hurry Up Tomorrow	The Weeknd	Zgłowy	Krzysztof Zalewski	Tthe Grind	Otsochodzi	
February 20	Trap or die	Bambi	Trap or die	Bambi	Trap or die	Bambi	
February 27	25	Fisz Emade Tworzywo	25	Fisz Emade Tworzywo	Trap or die	Bambi	
March 6	Połączenia 2	Opał and Gibbs	Połączenia 2	Opał and Gibbs	Połączenia 2	Opał and Gibbs	
March 13	Fugazi	Kuban	Fugazi	Kuban	Fugazi	Kuban	
March 20	Mayhem	Lady Gaga	Mayhem	Lady Gaga	Mayhem	Lady Gaga	
March 27	Blizny	Turbo	Blizny	Turbo	Music	Playboi Carti	
April 3	Nareszcie w domu	Kuqe 2115	Nareszcie w domu	Kuqe 2115	Music	Playboi Carti	
April 10	Trójkąt warszawski	Taco Hemingway	Trójkąt warszawski	Taco Hemingway	Groteska	Jan-rapowanie	
April 17	Tak jak tutaj stoję	Wiktor Dyduła	Tak jak tutaj stoję	Wiktor Dyduła	Hit Me Hard and Soft	Billie Eilish	
April 24	Receptura	Pokahontaz	Receptura	Pokahontaz	Hit Me Hard and Soft	Billie Eilish	
May 1	Vox Veritatis	Tede	Vox Veritatis	Tede	Hit Me Hard and Soft	Billie Eilish	
May 8	Napisz jak będziesz	Sobel	Hard Cock	Bardal and Rów Babicze	Napisz jak będziesz	Sobel	
May 15	Pink Floyd at Pompeii – MCMLXXII	Pink Floyd	Pink Floyd at Pompeii – MCMLXXII	Pink Floyd	Napisz jak będziesz	Sobel	
May 22	The Shit Ov God	Behemoth	The Shit Ov God	Behemoth	Napisz jak będziesz	Sobel	
May 29	Dwoje ludzieńków	Sanah	Dwoje ludzieńków	Sanah	Napisz jak będziesz	Sobel	
June 5	Dwoje ludzieńków	Sanah	Dwoje ludzieńków	Sanah	Napisz jak będziesz	Sobel	
June 12	Kolorowe domy	Hubert.	Kolorowe domy	Hubert.	Napisz jak będziesz	Sobel	
June 19	Tylko haj	Dawid Podsiadło and Kaśka Sochacka	Tylko haj	Dawid Podsiadło and Kaśka Sochacka	Napisz jak będziesz	Sobel	
June 26	Tylko haj	Dawid Podsiadło and Kaśka Sochacka	Tylko haj	Dawid Podsiadło and Kaśka Sochacka	Napisz jak będziesz	Sobel	
July 3	Tylko haj	Dawid Podsiadło and Kaśka Sochacka	Desire: Unleash	Enhypen	Napisz jak będziesz	Sobel	
July 10	Kult Tenerife 29.11.2024	Kult	Kult Tenerife 29.11.2024	Kult	Napisz jak będziesz	Sobel	
July 17	Północ / południe	Quebonafide	Depeche_mood	Peja, Slums Attack and DJ Decks	Północ / południe	Quebonafide	
July 24	Napisz jak będziesz	Sobel	Dwoje ludzieńków	Sanah	KPop Demon Hunters (Soundtrack from the Netflix Film)	Various artists	
July 31	Napisz jak będziesz	Sobel	Breakthrough	Joe Bonamassa	KPop Demon Hunters (Soundtrack from the Netflix Film)	Various artists	
August 7	Futurista	Pidżama Porno	Futurista	Pidżama Porno	KPop Demon Hunters (Soundtrack from the Netflix Film)	Various artists	
August 14	KPop Demon Hunters (Soundtrack from the Netflix Film)	Various artists	Łzy anioła	Cztery Pory Miłowania	KPop Demon Hunters (Soundtrack from the Netflix Film)	Various artists	
August 21	Napisz jak będziesz	Sobel	No More Tears	Ozzy Osbourne	KPop Demon Hunters (Soundtrack from the Netflix Film)	Various artists	
August 28	2039: Złote Piaski	Mata	Hit Me Hard and Soft	Billie Eilish	2039: Złote Piaski	Mata	
September 4	Karma	Stray Kids	Karma	Stray Kids	2039: Złote Piaski	Mata	
September 11	Man's Best Friend	Sabrina Carpenter	Man's Best Friend	Sabrina Carpenter	2039: Złote Piaski	Mata	
September 18	2039: Złote Piaski	Mata	Sentymentalia	Shhieda	2039: Złote Piaski	Mata	
September 25	Play	Ed Sheeran	Play	Ed Sheeran	2039: Złote Piaski	Mata	
October 2	Emophase	Seni and Inee	Emophase	Seni and Inee	2039: Złote Piaski	Mata	
October 9	Światłocienie	Julia Wieniawa	Światłocienie	Julia Wieniawa	2039: Złote Piaski	Mata	
October 16	The Life of a Showgirl	Taylor Swift	The Life of a Showgirl	Taylor Swift	The Life of a Showgirl	Taylor Swift	
October 23	WPR	Avi	WPR	Avi	2039: Złote Piaski	Mata	
October 30	Kult Tenerife 29.11.2024	Kult	Kult Tenerife 29.11.2024	Kult	2039: Złote Piaski	Mata	
November 6	Ex umbra ad libertatem	PRO8L3M	Ex umbra ad libertatem	PRO8L3M	Ex umbra ad libertatem	PRO8L3M	
November 13	Muzyka popularna	Pezet	Muzyka popularna	Pezet	Muzyka popularna	Pezet	
November 20	Friend7	Friendz	Friend7	Friendz	2039: Złote Piaski	Mata	
November 27	Dawid Podsiadło i Artur Rojek na żywo w Katowicach – Zorza 2025	Dawid Podsiadło and Artur Rojek	Dawid Podsiadło i Artur Rojek na żywo w Katowicach – Zorza 2025	Dawid Podsiadło and Artur Rojek	2039: Złote Piaski	Mata	
December 4	Północ / południe	Quebonafide	Północ / południe	Quebonafide	2039: Złote Piaski	Mata	
December 11	Tylko haj	Dawid Podsiadło and Kaśka Sochacka	Tylko haj	Dawid Podsiadło and Kaśka Sochacka	Boks stop	Bungee	
December 18	Męskie Granie 2025	Various artists	Męskie Granie 2025	Various artists	Boks stop	Bungee	
December 25	Kult Tenerife 29.11.2024	Kult	Kult Tenerife 29.11.2024	Kult	Boks stop	Bungee	

== See also ==
- List of number-one singles of 2025 (Poland)
