= Comfort and Happiness =

Studio album by Dawid Podsiadło
- Released: 28 May 2013
- Genres: Pop, pop-rock
- Label: Sony Music
- Producer: Bogdan Kondracki

Dawid Podsiadło chronology
Comfort and Happiness (2013)	Annoyance and Disappointment (2015)

Singles from Comfort and Happiness
- 1. "Trójkąty i kwadraty" Released: 6 May 2013; 2. "Nieznajomy" Released: 16 September 2013; 3. "Powiedz mi, że nie chcesz" Released: 4 November 2013; 4. "No" Released: 16 June 2014

Comfort and Happiness is the debut studio album by Polish singer Dawid Podsiadło. It was released on 28 May 2013 through Sony Music. It was produced by Bogdan Kondracki.

The album debuted at number one of the Polish Albums Chart OLiS, was certified Diamond in Poland, and became the number one best-selling album of 2013 in Poland.

== Release and promotion ==
The album was released on 28 May 2013. It was promoted by the lead single "Trójkąty i kwadraty", released on 6 May 2013, and the second single "Nieznajomy", released on 16 September 2013. Following the release of the album, Podsiadło performed at Open'er Festival on 3 July 2013 as the artist opening the festival, and embarked on a national tour in September 2013.

On 26 November 2013, a re-issue of Comfort and Happiness (called the "Deluxe Edition") was released. It included three bonus tracks: "T.E.A", "Jump", and Podsiadło's third single from the album, "Powiedz mi, że nie chcesz". The Deluxe Edition of the album also included DVD disc containing Comfort and Happiness Tour – Making Of film, and music videos for the singles "Trójkąty i kwadraty" and "Nieznajomy".

On 16 June 2014, the fourth single from the album, titled "No", was released.

== Track listing ==
All tracks are written by Dawid Podsiadło and Karolina Kozak.

No.	Title	Length
1.	"And I"	5:16
2.	"!H.A.P.P.Y!"	3:28
3.	"Nieznajomy" (Stranger)	4:55
4.	"Trójkąty i kwadraty" (Triangles and squares)	4:03
5.	"Elephant"	4:20
6.	"Vitane"	4:01
7.	"No"	4:08
8.	"I'm Searching"	4:13
9.	"Bridge"	3:53
10.	"No, Pt. 2"	4:35
11.	"Little Stranger"	4:57
12.	"S&T"	4:01

Deluxe edition bonus tracks
No.	Title	Length
13.	"T.E.A"
14.	"Jump"
15.	"Powiedz mi, że nie chcesz"

Deluxe edition bonus DVD
No.	Title	Length
1.	"Comfort and Happiness Tour – Making Of" (film)	37:57
2.	"Trójkąty i kwadraty" (music video)
3.	"Nieznajomy" (music video)

== Charts and certifications ==
=== Weekly charts ===
Chart (2013)	Peak position
Polish Albums (ZPAV)	1

=== Year-end charts ===
Chart (2013)	Position
Polish Albums (ZPAV)	1
Chart (2016)	Position
Polish Albums (ZPAV)	34

=== Certifications ===
Region	Certification	Certified units/sales
Poland (ZPAV)	Diamond	150,000^{‡}
^{‡} Sales+streaming figures based on certification alone.

== Release history ==
Region	Date	Label	Format	Edition
Poland	28 May 2013	Sony Music	CD, digital download	Standard Edition
Poland	26 November 2013	Sony Music	CD/DVD, digital download	Deluxe Edition

== See also ==
- List of number-one albums of 2013 (Poland)
