= List of number-one dance singles in Poland =

This is a list of the number-one singles on the Polish Top – Dyskoteki chart, ranking the most-played songs in nightclubs across Poland. It was compiled by DJ Promotion and published by the Polish Society of the Phonographic Industry (ZPAV) between April 2010 and August 2018.

== Lists of number-one dance singles ==
2010 · 2011 · 2013

== See also ==
- Polish music charts
- List of number-one singles in Poland
