= List of number-one albums of 2003 (Poland) =

These are the Polish number one albums of 2003, per the OLiS Chart.

== Chart history ==
Issue date	Album	Artist(s)	Reference(s)
January 13	Upojenie	Anna Maria Jopek & Pat Metheny	
January 20	Upojenie	Anna Maria Jopek & Pat Metheny	
January 27	Upojenie	Anna Maria Jopek & Pat Metheny	
February 3	Upojenie	Anna Maria Jopek & Pat Metheny	
February 10	Upojenie	Anna Maria Jopek & Pat Metheny	
February 17	Hable con ella (Porozmawiaj z nią)	Muzyka filmowa	
February 24	100th Window	Massive Attack	
March 3	Kora Ola Ola!	Kora	
March 10	Kora Ola Ola!	Kora	
March 17	Borysewicz & Kukiz	Jan Borysewicz i Paweł Kukiz	
March 24	RMF FM – Moja i twoja muzyka	Różni wykonawcy	
March 31	RMF FM – Moja i twoja muzyka	Różni wykonawcy	
April 7	RMF FM – Moja i twoja muzyka	Różni wykonawcy	
April 14	RMF FM – Moja i twoja muzyka	Różni wykonawcy	
April 21	Trudno nie wierzyć w nic	Raz, Dwa, Trzy	
April 28	Trudno nie wierzyć w nic	Raz, Dwa, Trzy	
May 12	The Best of Ich Troje	Ich Troje	
May 19	The Best of Ich Troje	Ich Troje	
May 26	The Best of Ich Troje	Ich Troje	
June 2	The Best of Ich Troje	Ich Troje	
June 9	The Matrix Reloaded (Matrix Reaktywacja)	Muzyka filmowa	
June 16	St. Anger	Metallica	
June 23	St. Anger	Metallica	
June 30	St. Anger	Metallica	
July 7	Kabaret TEY (1971-1980)	Kabaret TEY	
July 14	Nie czekaj na jutro	Łzy	
July 21	Kabaret TEY (1971-1980)	Kabaret TEY	
July 28	Kabaret TEY (1971-1980)	Kabaret TEY	
August 4	Kabaret TEY (1971-1980)	Kabaret TEY	
August 11	Kabaret TEY (1971-1980)	Kabaret TEY	
August 18	Kabaret TEY (1971-1980)	Kabaret TEY	
August 25	Kabaret TEY (1971-1980)	Kabaret TEY	
September 1	Stereo typ	Kayah	
September 8	Stereo typ	Kayah	
September 15	Myśli i słowa	Bajm	
September 22	Myśli i słowa	Bajm	
September 29	Myśli i słowa	Bajm	
October 6	Sacred Love	Sting	
October 13	Life for Rent	Dido	
October 20	Life for Rent	Dido	
October 27	Life for Rent	Dido	
November 3	Ladies	Różni wykonawcy	
November 10	Ladies	Różni wykonawcy	
November 24	Ladies	Różni wykonawcy	
December 1	Music, Music	Hey	
December 8	Music, Music	Hey	
December 15	Nieprzyzwoite piosenki	Anita Lipnicka & John Porter	
December 22	Nieprzyzwoite piosenki	Anita Lipnicka & John Porter	
December 29	Nieprzyzwoite piosenki	Anita Lipnicka & John Porter	
