= Gang Albanii =

Polish hip-hop group

- Origin: Poland
- Genre: hip hop
- Years active: 2014–2017
- Label: Step Records
- Members: Popek; Robert M (Rozbójnik Alibaba); Borixon

Gang Albanii was a Polish hip-hop group formed in 2014 by DJ Rozbójnik Alibaba, rapper Popek and rapper Borixon. They released 2 albums and 13 singles before disbanding in 2017.

== Etymology ==
In Polish, Gang Albanii means "Gang of Albania". Popek lived in the United Kingdom, where he met Albakrallet, who influenced him to name his new band after them.

== Career ==
Gang Albanii achieved notable popularity in Poland before disbanding. Their most popular song Dla prawdziwych dam (For the True Ladies) has over 80 million views on YouTube. They are recognized for their obscene lyrics, which are usually about drugs, hookers or bank robberies. Popek, the group's leader, cannot officially appear on stage concerts, as he is on the run from the Polish police. To circumvent this, he performs onscreen through Skype.

Gang Albanii released their first album Królowie życia (Kings of Life) in 2015. The album turned was well-received. It sold more than 90 thousand copies, awarding the group a triple platinum record from ZPAV.

Gang Albanii's second album, Ciężki Gnój (Heavy Dung), was scheduled to be released in 2016.

== Discography ==
Albums

Title	Album details	Peak chart positions	Sales	Certifications
Title	Album details	POL	Sales	Certifications
Królowie życia	Date: April 24, 2015; Label: Step Records	1	POL: 150,000+	POL: 3× Platinum
Ciężki gnój	Data: April 29, 2016; Label: Step Records	2	POL: 50,000+	POL: Platinum

Singles

Year	Title	Peak Chart Positions		Album	Certifications
Year	Title	Eska	POL NEW	Album	Certifications
2015
2015	„Napad na bank”	–	–	Królowie życia	* ZPAV: Diamond
2015	„Albański raj”	–	–	Królowie życia	* ZPAV: Diamentowa płyta
2015	„Dla prawdziwych dam”	1	4	Królowie życia	* ZPAV: Diamond
"—" indicates, the single was not on the list of top music.
