= Samotność po zmierzchu =

Studio album by Ania
- Released: 23 February 2004
- Recorded: 2003
- Genre: Pop; chillout
- Length: 47:25
- Label: Sony BMG
- Producer: Bogdan Kondracki

Ania chronology
| Samotność po zmierzchu (2004) | Kilka historii na ten sam temat (2006) |

Samotność po zmierzchu is the debut studio album by Polish singer Ania, released in 2004.

== Background ==
The album's title translates Solitude After Dusk. Ania worked on it with acclaimed Polish producer, Bogdan Kondracki. Album presented wide range of styles: pop, soul, chillout, rhythm and blues. It contained two reworkings of songs by A Camp and OMD.

It gathered strongly favourable reviews and achieved great commercial success, reaching #1 in Polish albums chart. The album went Gold in Poland and was one of the bestselling records in that country in 2004. It spawned five singles, most notably major hits "Tego chciałam" and "Charlie, Charlie". Samotność po zmierzchu was re-released twice in 2004.

== Track listing ==
1. "Pamiętać chcę" - 3:41
2. "Tego chciałam" - 2:59
3. "Nie ma nic w co mógłbyś wierzyć" - 4:25
4. "Charlie, Charlie" - 2:59
5. "Czy ktoś spytać chce czemu stało się tak" - 3:37
6. "Nie mogę cię zapomnieć" - 3:21
7. "Zima '81" - 5:28
8. "Gangsta" - 3:47
9. "Tylko słowa zostały" - 3:23
10. "Inna" - 5:36
11. "Glory" - 4:18
12. "Souvenir" - 3:47

== Singles ==
- 2004: "Tego chciałam"
- 2004: "Glory"/"Nie ma nic w co mógłbyś wierzyć"
- 2004: "Charlie, Charlie"
- 2004: "Inna"
