= List of number-one albums of 2002 (Poland) =

These are the Polish number one albums of 2002, per the OLiS Chart.

== Chart history ==
Issue date	Album	Artist(s)	Reference(s)
14 January	Ad.4	Ich Troje	
21 January	Ad.4	Ich Troje	
28 January	Ad.4	Ich Troje	
4 February	Ten New Songs	Leonard Cohen	
11 February	Ten New Songs	Leonard Cohen	
25 February	Lord of the Rings – The Fellowship of the Ring	Muzyka filmowa	
4 March	Lord of the Rings – The Fellowship of the Ring	Muzyka filmowa	
11 March	Lord of the Rings – The Fellowship of the Ring	Muzyka filmowa	
18 March	Lord of the Rings – The Fellowship of the Ring	Muzyka filmowa	
25 March	Perła	Edyta Górniak	
2 April	Golec uOrkiestra 3 – Kiloherce prosto w serce	Golec uOrkiestra	
8 April	Nienasycenie	Anna Maria Jopek	
10 April	Nienasycenie	Anna Maria Jopek	
17 April	Nienasycenie	Anna Maria Jopek	
29 April	Nienasycenie	Anna Maria Jopek	
13 May	Nienasycenie	Anna Maria Jopek	
20 May	Nienasycenie	Anna Maria Jopek	
27 May	Po piąte... a niech gadają	Ich Troje	
3 June	Po piąte... a niech gadają	Ich Troje	
10 June	Po piąte... a niech gadają	Ich Troje	
17 June	Po piąte... a niech gadają	Ich Troje	
24 June	Po piąte... a niech gadają	Ich Troje	
1 July	Po piąte... a niech gadają	Ich Troje	
8 July	Po piąte... a niech gadają	Ich Troje	
15 July	Po piąte... a niech gadają	Ich Troje	
22 July	By the Way	Red Hot Chili Peppers	
29 July	By the Way	Red Hot Chili Peppers	
5 August	Po piąte... a niech gadają	Ich Troje	
12 August	Po piąte... a niech gadają	Ich Troje	
19 August	Po piąte... a niech gadają	Ich Troje	
26 August	Po piąte... a niech gadają	Ich Troje	
2 September	200 Po Vstrechnoy	t.A.T.u.	
9 September	Seul	Garou	
16 September	4	Wilki	
23 September	4	Wilki	
30 September	4	Wilki	
7 October	Występ	KaEnŻet (Kazik na żywo)	
14 October	Występ	KaEnŻet (Kazik na żywo)	
21 October	Występ	KaEnŻet (Kazik na żywo)	
28 October	Antidotum	Kasia Kowalska	
4 November	Antidotum	Kasia Kowalska	
11 November	Antidotum	Kasia Kowalska	
18 November	Antidotum	Kasia Kowalska	
25 November	... Bo marzę i śnię	Krzysztof Krawczyk	
2 December	... Bo marzę i śnię	Krzysztof Krawczyk	
9 December	... Bo marzę i śnię	Krzysztof Krawczyk	
16 December	... Bo marzę i śnię	Krzysztof Krawczyk	
23 December	Upojenie	Anna Maria Jopek & Pat Metheny	
