= W spodniach czy w sukience? =

Studio album by Ania
- Released: 16 June 2008
- Recorded: 2008
- Genre: Pop; retro
- Label: Sony BMG
- Producer: Bogdan Kondracki

Ania chronology
Kilka historii na ten sam temat (2006)	W spodniach czy w sukience? (2008)	Ania Movie (2010)

W spodniach czy w sukience? is the third studio album by Polish singer Ania, released in 2008.

== Background ==
The album continued the retro-inspired theme from Ania's previous record, with sleeve photos and arrangements reminiscing 1950s and 1960s style. The album's title translates In Trousers or in Dress?.

W spodniach czy w sukience? managed to repeat the success of two previous albums. It reached #1 in Polish albums chart and received mostly positive feedback from music critics. The album spawned two hit singles: "Nigdy więcej nie tańcz ze mną" and the title track. Three months after its release, W spodniach czy w sukience? was certified Platinum.

== Track listing ==
1. "Turu tu tu..." - 3:40
2. "Smutek mam we krwi" - 3:31
3. "W spodniach czy w sukience" - 5:18
4. "Nigdy więcej nie tańcz ze mną" - 2:58
5. "Znowu przyszło lato" - 3:38
6. "Póki mi starczy sił" - 5:01
7. "Bardzo lubię opowiadania o miłości" - 2:48
8. "Jesteś jak sen o spadaniu" - 3:08
9. "Ciągle mylę cię z nim" - 5:05
10. "Zmieniaj mnie gdy zechcesz" - 4:22

== Singles ==
- 2008: "Nigdy więcej nie tańcz ze mną"
- 2008: "W spodniach czy w sukience"
- 2009: "Smutek mam we krwi"
