= Małomiasteczkowy =

2018 song by Dawid Podsiadło

Single by Dawid Podsiadło

from the album Małomiasteczkowy
- Released: 6 June 2018
- Studio: Sony Music Entertainment Poland
- Genre: indie pop
- Length: 3:23
- Label: Agora
- Songwriter: Dawid Podsiadło
- Producer: Bartosz Dziedzic

Dawid Podsiadło singles chronology
"Pastempomat" (2018)	"Małomiasteczkowy" (2018)	"Nie ma fal" (2018)

Music video
- "Małomiasteczkowy" on YouTube

"Małomiasteczkowy" (Polish: [ma.wɔ.mjas.tɛt͡ʂˈkɔ.vɘ̟]; lit. 'provincial', 'small-town') is a Polish-language indie pop single performed by Dawid Podsiadło. The lyrics were written by Dawid Podsiadło, and the music was composed and produced by Bartosz Dziedzic. The song was released as a single on 6 June 2018 by Sony Music Entertainment Poland label company, and later appeared on the Małomiasteczkowy album which was released on 19 October 2018.

The song was highly listed on numerous music charts in Poland, including having first place on AirPlay – Top and AirPlay – Nowości by the Polish Society of the Phonographic Industry. It was awarded the diamond certification by the Polish Society of the Phonographic Industry. In 2019, it was nominated to the Fryderyk award, in the categories of best song, and best music video of the year.

== Charts ==
Chart (2019)	Peak position
Poland (AirPlay – Top)	1
Poland (AirPlay – Nowości)	1
Poland (AirPlay – TV)	4
Poland (Podsumowanie 2018)	5

== Certifications ==
Region	Certification	Certified units/sales
Poland (ZPAV)	Diamond	100,000^{‡}
^{‡} Sales+streaming figures based on certification alone.

== Awards ==
Year	Award	Category	Result	Ref(s)
2019	Fryderyk	Best song of the year	Nominated	
2019	Fryderyk	Best music video of the year	Nominated	
