= Kilka historii na ten sam temat =

Studio album by Ania
- Released: 16 October 2006
- Recorded: 2006
- Genre: Pop; retro
- Length: 38:46
- Label: Sony BMG
- Producer: Bogdan Kondracki

Ania chronology
Samotność po zmierzchu (2004)	Kilka historii na ten sam temat (2006)	W spodniach czy w sukience? (2008)

Kilka historii na ten sam temat is the second studio album by the Polish singer Ania, released in 2006.

== Background ==
Kilka historii na ten sam temat, whose title translates A Few Stories on the Same Subject, was the first of Ania's albums to reference Polish music history and fully exploit retro style, what would become the trademark of her later works.

The album turned out both commercial and artistic success, gathering favourable reviews and selling even better than her debut release. It reached #1 in Polish album sales chart and went Platinum in that country. The album was promoted by three singles, with "Trudno mi się przyznać" and "Czekam..." becoming major hits.

== Track listing ==
1. "Zostań" - 2:51
2. "Trudno mi się przyznać" - 2:58
3. "Nic się nie stało" - 3:22
4. "Musisz wierzyć" - 3:18
5. "Czekam..." - 3:32
6. "Czego ona chce?" - 3:09
7. "Wiosna" - 3:33
8. "L'ultimo" - 3:41
9. "Opowiedz mi" - 3:47
10. "Już mnie nie ma w twoich planach" - 4:53
11. "Niech zniknie cały świat" - 3:41

== Singles ==
- 2006: "Trudno mi się przyznać"
- 2007: "Czekam..."
- 2007: "Musisz wierzyć"
