= Anita Sokołowska =

Polish actress

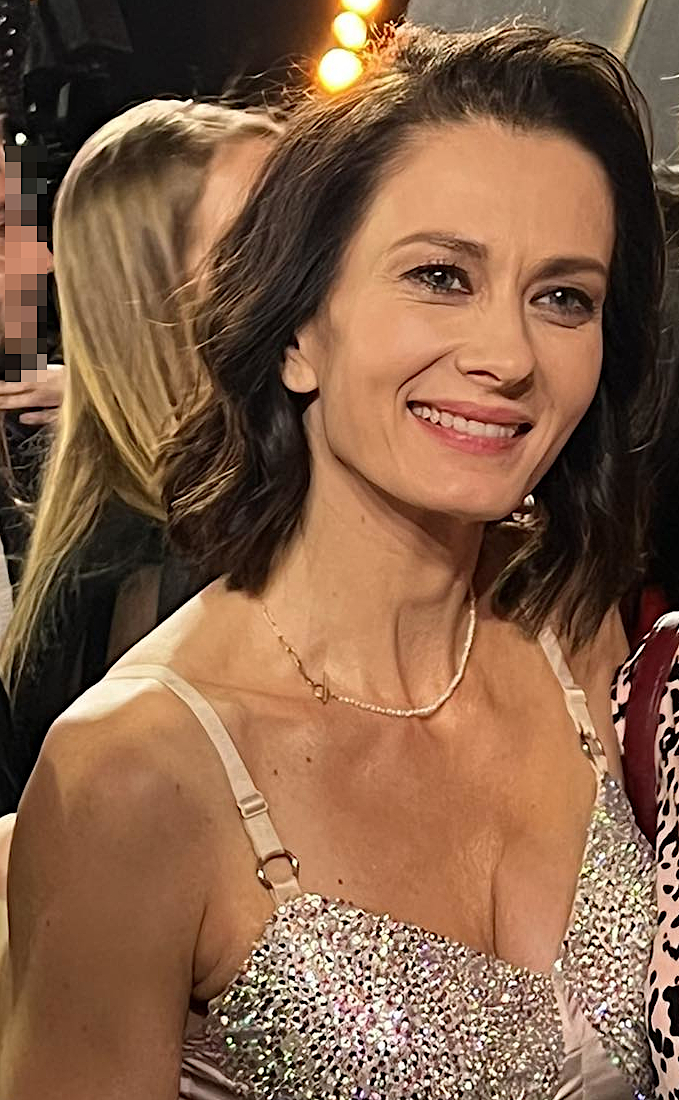
- Born: 25 January 1976 (age 50); Lublin, Poland
- Years active: 1999–present
- Known for: Lena in Na dobre i na złe
- Spouse: actor Rafał Malinowski (until 2009)
- Website: http://www.filmpolski.pl/fp/index.php/1128768

Anita Sokołowska (born 25 January 1976) is a Polish theatrical, movie and television actress.

Sokołowska graduated from the National Film School in Łódź in 1999. She is best known for the role of doctor Lena Starska in Na dobre i na złe, a show that she has been appearing in since 2004. Apart from the below titles, she has appeared in about twenty different theatre-plays.

== Filmography ==
- 2012-2023: Przyjaciółki (TV series) as Zuzanna Markiewicz
- 2004-2018: Na dobre i na złe (TV-series) .... as dr Lena Starska
- 2007: Testosteron .... as Kornel's mother
- 2006: Autonaprawa
- 2006: Mokre bajeczka (short cartoon)
- 2006: Fałszerze - Powrót Sfory (TV-miniseries) .... as Anita Nowicka
- 2005: Pensjonat pod Różą (TV-series) .... as Alina (guest-appearance, x2)
- 2005: Klinika samotnych serc (TV-series) .... as Grażyna Broniecka (guest-appearance, x2)
- 2004: Czego biją się faceci, czyli seks w mniejszym mieście (TV-series) .... as Joanna Wysocka (guest appearance)
- 2003: Polowanie
- 2003: Na dobre i na złe (TV-series) .... as Matylda Różańska (guest-appearance)
- 2003: Miodowe lata (TV-series) .... as Hania Kalicka (guest-appearance)
- 2003: Kasia i Tomek (TV-series) .... as Psychologist (guest-appearance)
- 2001: Znajomi z widzenia
- 2001: Domek dla Julii
- 2001: 0 : 13
- 2000: Sfora (TV-miniseries) .... as Anita Nowicka
- 1999-2000: Trędowata (TV-series) .... as Stefcia Rudecka / Zuzanna Korab-Rudecka
- 1999: Historia jednego dnia
