= Top – Dyskoteki =

Top – Dyskoteki (English: Top – Discotheques) was a record chart ranking the most popular dance songs played in nightclubs across Poland.

== History ==
The chart was launched as Top 50 in April 2010 by the Polish Society of the Phonographic Industry (ZPAV). It was compiled by Polish disc jockey organization DJ Promotion from several hundred play reports. The ranking was published biweekly on both DJ Promotion and ZPAV websites, although not always regularly, and in 2012, only one issue was made available. From February 2014, the chart was published weekly. ZPAV ceased publishing the chart in August 2018, but DJ Promotion has continued to compile it as Polish Dance Chart – DJ Top 50.

== See also ==
- List of number-one dance singles in Poland
- Polish music charts
