= Qry =

Polish rapper

- Born: Patryk Lubaś; March 12, 1999 (age 27); Jasło, Poland
- Origin: Polish
- Genres: hip hop, trap, rap
- Occupations: rapper, songwriter
- Instrument: vocals
- Years active: since 2016
- Past members: Chillwagon (2018–2022), Trzech Króli (2023–)

Qry (born Patryk Lubaś March 12, 1999, in Jasło) is a Polish rapper and songwriter. He is a member of the bands Chillwagon and Trzech Króli.

He has collaborated with artists such as Borixon, Kizo, Smolasty, Żabson, and the group Ekipa. Throughout his career, he has released over 35 singles, with four achieving gold record status, and five platinum.

== Personal life ==
On March 14, 2022, he began dating The Voice Kids participant Hanna Sztachańska. The couple separated in 2022.

Currently, the rapper is dating Julita Różalska, a member of the Genzie project. The singer announced their relationship through a joint performance in his song "Tyrka".
