= Polish music charts =

The Polish music charts are provided by ZPAV, the Polish Society of the Phonographic Industry (Polish: Związek Producentów Audio-Video).

== Albums charts ==
=== Current ===
Name	Publisher	Positions	Date of first chart	Description
OLiS	Polish Society of the Phonographic Industry	100 (Note: 50 until 5 January 2023.)	23 October 2000	List of the most popular albums in Poland based on physical sales and streaming.
OLiS – physical albums	Polish Society of the Phonographic Industry	100	12 January 2023	List of the best-selling physical albums.
OLiS – streaming albums	Polish Society of the Phonographic Industry	100	12 January 2023	List of the most popular albums in streaming services.
OLiS – vinyl albums	Polish Society of the Phonographic Industry	50 (Note: 30 until 5 January 2023)	1 June 2017	List of the best-selling vinyl albums.

=== History ===
In the 1970s and the 1980s, Polish music monthly Non Stop published a year-end list of the best selling albums in Poland. In the mid-1990s, two monthly sales lists were launched and published in music magazines. The first one was a top 50 compiled by ZPAV, based on shipment, not sales, which continues to be published to date. The other was a top 100 called Gorąca Setka (English: Hot 100), printed monthly in Gazeta Muzyczna. This chart was compiled from actual sale figures as reported by over 130 music shops across Poland and included both albums and singles.

From October 1994 to September 1997, journalist Artur Orzech presented a weekly top 20 albums list on Radio Bis which was later extended to 25 and 30 positions. This chart was also based on actual sales data obtained from about 150 music shops, including albums as well as singles as opposed to being two separate lists. As the chart ended when Radio Bis ceased, this meant that Poland was without a weekly chart for two years.

The official weekly albums chart, OLiS, consisting of 50 positions, was launched in October 2000. This chart was strictly based on physical albums sales from selected major retailers. In 2010 monthly OLiS chart was also launched.

In 2017, weekly and monthly vinyl sales charts were launched to reflect the resurgence of popularity of the vinyl format.

On 16 January 2023 ZPAV announced that starting from its current chart OLiS would be based not only on physical sales, but also streaming equivalents from four services: Spotify, YouTube (including YouTube Music and YouTube Premium), Apple Music and Deezer. Apart from that, both monthly charts were defunct and two new weekly charts were created: for physical sale only and for streaming only.

== Singles charts ==
=== Current ===
Name	Publisher	Positions	Date of first chart	Description
OLiA (Official Airplay Chart) (Note: AirPlay Top until 7 January 2023.)	Polish Society of the Phonographic Industry	100 (Note: 5 until 21 September 2013 and 20 from 28 September 2013 to 31 October 2015.)	27 March 2010	List of the most popular singles in Polish radio stations, based on listeners numbers (not amount of plays).
OLiS – streaming singles	Polish Society of the Phonographic Industry	100	12 January 2023	List of the most popular songs in streaming services.
Poland Songs	Billboard	25	22 February 2022	List of the most popular songs in digital sale and streaming services.

=== History ===
There has been no official singles chart in Poland based on actual sales data. In the 1970s and the 1980s, Polish music monthly Non Stop published selected year-end statistics regarding the singles market. The popularity of individual songs has always been reflected by radio polls and hit lists, compiled from the listeners' votes. Some of the most popular were the charts on Rozgłośnia Harcerska (Polish Pathfinder Station) with its top 10 regularly printed in Billboard, and Polish Radio 3's Lista Przebojów Programu Trzeciego.

Not many singles were released and the market instead focused on longplays and 4-track extended plays. The single format has been somewhat substituted with cardboard records which were produced on a massive scale and sold in large quantities. Efforts to boost the sales of CD singles in the 1990s were unsuccessful and Polish artists have rarely released singles in physical format.

In 2010, ZPAV launched the following lists:

- AirPlay Top (Top 100 since 7 November 2015; Top 20 between 28 September 2013 and 31 October 2015; Top 5 between 27 March 2010 and 21 September 2013) – the most popular songs on biggest Polish radio stations
- AirPlay Nowości (Top 5) – the most popular new songs (new entries on the main chart)
- AirPlay Największe Skoki (Top 5) – fastest climbing songs on the chart
- AirPlay TV (Top 5) – Polish video chart presenting the most popular music videos on music TV channels
- Top – Dyskoteki (Top 50) – Polish dance chart presenting the most popular songs in clubs, last updated in 2018
- Top Centra Handlowe (Top 20) – an irregular list of the most popular songs played in stores and shopping centres, last updated in 2014

On 14 February 2022 Billboard announced a new group of lists called Hits of the World, ranking 25 top songs in several countries based on digital sales and streaming services. Poland is one of them.

On 16 January 2023 ZPAV announced launching of new chart called OLiS – streaming singles, listing the most popular songs in four streaming services: Spotify, YouTube (including YouTube Music and YouTube Premium), Apple Music and Deezer. Simultaneously the AirPlay Top was renamed as OLiA (Oficjalna Lista Airplay – Official Airplay Chart), while AirPlay Nowości, AirPlay Największe Skoki and AirPlay TV were defunct.

== See also ==
- List of number-one albums in Poland
- List of number-one singles in Poland
- List of number-one dance singles in Poland
