= Dawid Podsiadło =

Polish singer-songwriter

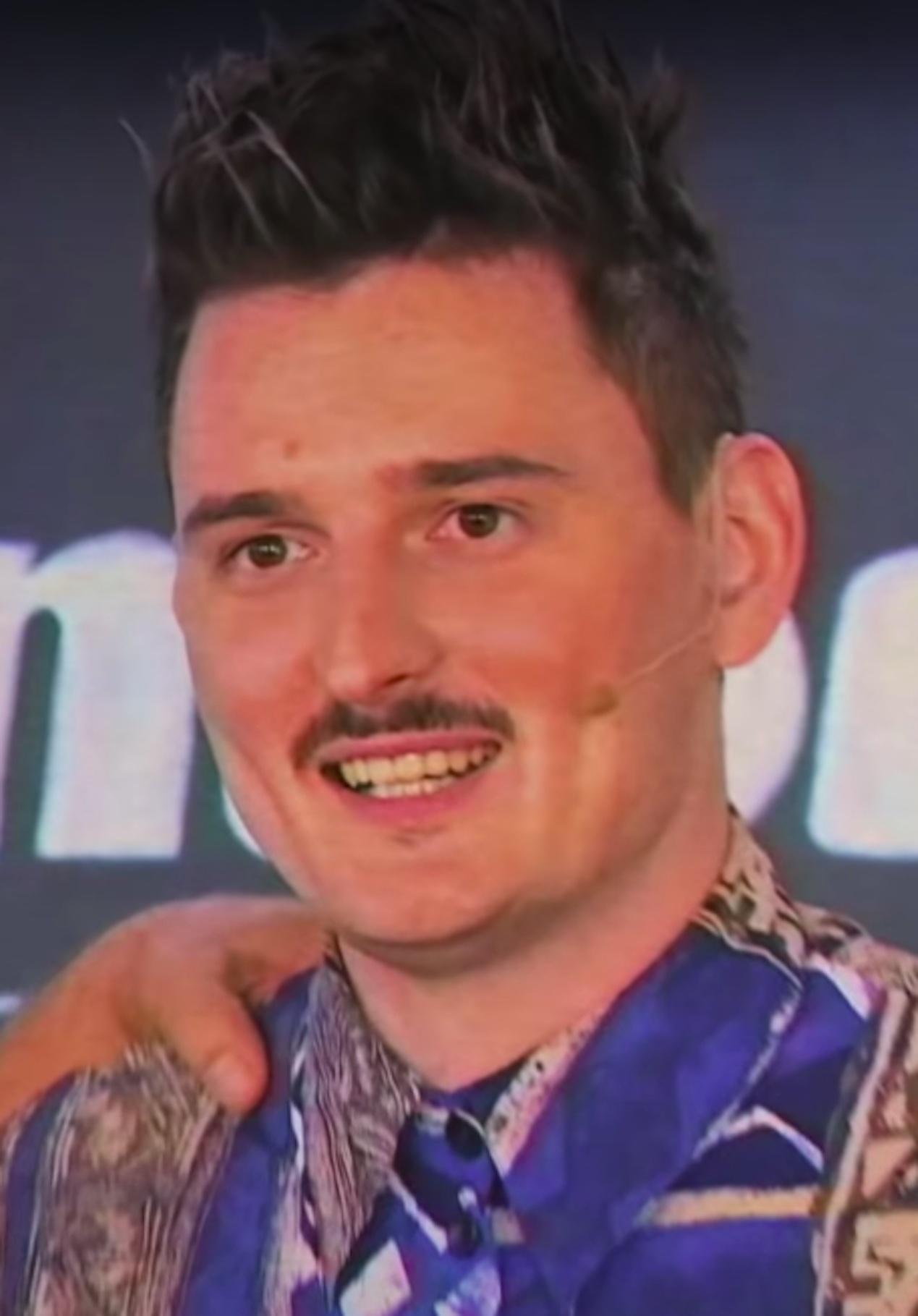
- Podsiadło in 2021

Background information
- Also known as: David Ross
- Born: Dawid Henryk Podsiadło; 23 May 1993 (age 33); Dąbrowa Górnicza, Poland
- Genres: Pop rock; alternative rock; Britpop; blues; indie pop
- Occupations: Singer, songwriter
- Instruments: Vocals, guitar, piano, ukulele
- Years active: 2009–present
- Label: Sony Music Entertainment Poland

Dawid Henryk Podsiadło ([pɔtɕadwɔ]; born 23 May 1993) is a Polish singer-songwriter who won the second series of X Factor in 2012. He received PLN 100,000 and a recording contract with Sony Music. On the show, he was mentored by Tatiana Okupnik.

His debut album, titled Comfort and Happiness, was released on 28 May 2013. It debuted at number one on the Polish Albums Chart and was certified triple Platinum the same year, becoming the best-selling album of 2013 in Poland. The album received Diamond certification in 2015.

In October 2014, Podsiadło released an album with his band Curly Heads. The album, titled Ruby Dress Skinny Dog and produced by Daniel Walczak, debuted at number four on the Polish Albums Chart and was certified Gold. The album was nominated for the 2015 Fryderyk award in the Rock Album of the Year category.

Podsiadło's second solo album, Annoyance and Disappointment, was released on 6 November 2015. The album debuted at number one in Poland and was certified Diamond.

== Biography ==
=== Early life and education ===
Dawid Podsiadło was born and raised in Dąbrowa Górnicza. He attended the Walerian Łukasiński Secondary School and received formal musical education at a music school, where he studied trombone in the class of Grzegorz Pytlik. During his youth, he received vocal training at the Youth Creative Work Center (MOPT). At the age of 12, he performed in an amateur music competition in Tunisia, where he sang a song by the band Myslovitz. In interviews, Podsiadło stated that he was a dedicated student who preferred attending classes, which influenced his early social interactions and a desire for peer acceptance.

=== Career ===
In 2010, Podsiadło formed the rock band Curly Heads with school friends. Before his solo breakthrough, the band performed in local venues and sometimes paid to play in pubs. In 2011, he participated in the first season of the Polish version of The X Factor but was eliminated during the bootcamp stage. He returned in 2012 for the second series, which he ultimately won.

His debut studio album, Comfort and Happiness (2013), was produced by Bogdan Kondracki and reached number one on the Polish Albums Chart. Podsiadło wrote the English lyrics, while Karolina Kozak wrote the Polish lyrics for the singles "Trójkąty i Kwadraty" and "Nieznajomy". The album earned four Fryderyk awards and a nomination for the Paszport Polityki. In 2014, Curly Heads released their debut album Ruby Dress Skinny Dog, which received a Gold certification in Poland.

Following the release of his second Diamond-certified album, Annoyance and Disappointment (2015), Podsiadło took a one-year break from touring in 2017. He returned in 2018 with the album Małomiasteczkowy, produced by Bartosz Dziedzic, which includes songs related to urban life. The record earned him the Paszport Polityki award in the Entertainment Music category.

In September 2019, Podsiadło and rapper Taco Hemingway sold out the PGE Narodowy stadium in Warsaw for over 60,000 attendees, with tickets selling out within hours. In 2022, he released his fourth album, Lata dwudzieste, featuring danceable tracks alongside intimate compositions such as "mori". In 2023, he performed a solo 360-degree concert at the PGE Narodowy for 80,000 people, setting a record for a Polish act at the time. Since 2021, he has co-hosted the Podsiadło Kotarski Podcast.

== Discography ==
=== Studio albums ===
List of studio albums, with selected chart positions, sales figures and certifications
Title	Studio album details	Peak chart positions		Sales	Certifications
Title	Studio album details	POL	POL Streaming	Sales	Certifications
Comfort and Happiness	Released: 28 May 2013; Label: Sony Music Entertainment Poland; Formats: CD, LP, digital download, streaming	1	*	POL: 150,000	ZPAV: Diamond
Annoyance and Disappointment	Released: 6 November 2015; Label: Sony Music Entertainment Poland; Formats: CD, LP, digital download, streaming	1	80	POL: 150,000	ZPAV: Diamond
Małomiasteczkowy	Released: 19 October 2018; Label: Sony Music Entertainment Poland; Formats: CD, LP, digital download, streaming	1	31	POL: 300,000	ZPAV: 2× Diamond
Lata dwudzieste	Released: 21 October 2022; Label: Sony Music Entertainment Poland; Formats: CD, LP, digital download, streaming	1	1	POL: 150,000	ZPAV: Diamond
"*" denotes the chart did not exist at that time.

=== Reissues ===
List of reissues albums
Title	Reissues album details
Annoyance and Disappointment 2.0	Released: 21 October 2016; Label: Sony Music Entertainment Poland; Formats: CD, digital download, streaming
Re: Małomiasteczkowy	Released: 29 November 2019; Label: Sony Music Entertainment Poland; Formats: CD, digital download, streaming
Comfort and Happiness (10th Anniversary Edition)	Released: 26 May 2023; Label: Sony Music Entertainment Poland; Formats: LP, digital download, streaming
Lata dwudzieste z kawałkiem	Released: 10 May 2024; Label: Sony Music Entertainment Poland; Formats: LP, digital download, streaming
Annoyance and Disappointment (10th Anniversary Edition)	Released: 19 December 2025; Label: Sony Music Entertainment Poland; Formats: LP, digital download, streaming

=== Live albums ===
List of live albums, with selected chart positions
Title	Live album details	Peak chart positions		Sales	Certifications
Title	Live album details	POL	POL Streaming	Sales	Certifications
Leśna muzyka (live, czyli na żywo)	Released: 3 December 2021; Label: Sony Music Entertainment Poland; Formats: CD, LP, digital download, streaming	1	*	POL: 30,000	ZPAV: Platinum
Przed i po	Released: 8 December 2023; Label: Sony Music Entertainment Poland; Formats: CD	1	—	POL: 15,000	ZPAV: Gold
Dawid Podsiadło i Artur Rojek na żywo w Katowicach – Zorza 2025 (with Artur Rojek)	Released: 14 November 2025; Label: Sony Music Entertainment Poland; Formats: CD, LP, digital download, streaming	1	10	POL: 30,000	ZPAV: Platinum
"—" denotes a recording that did not chart or was not released in that territory. "*" denotes the chart did not exist at that time.

=== Extended plays ===
List of extended plays, with selected chart positions
Title	Extended play details	Peak chart positions		Sales	Certifications
Title	Extended play details	POL	POL Streaming	Sales	Certifications
EP (na żywo, akustycznie)	Released: 15 November 2019; Label: Sony Music Entertainment Poland; Formats: Digital download, streaming	—	*		
Trójkąty i kwadraty 2013–2023	Released: 5 May 2023; Label: Sony Music Entertainment Poland; Formats: Digital download, streaming	—	—		
Tylko haj (with Kaśka Sochacka)	Released: 6 June 2025; Label: Sony Music Entertainment Poland; Formats: CD, LP, digital download, streaming	1	2	POL: 60,000	ZPAV: 2× Platinum
"—" denotes a recording that did not chart or was not released in that territory. "*" denotes the chart did not exist at that time.

=== Singles ===
List of singles as lead artist, with selected chart positions and certifications, showing year released and album name
Title	Year	Peak chart positions				Certifications	Album
Title	Year	POL Air.	POL Stream.	POL Billb.	CZE Air.	Certifications	Album
"Tu i teraz" (with Tatiana Okupnik)	2012	—	*		—		Non-album single
"Trójkąty i kwadraty"	2013	—	*		—		Comfort and Happiness
"Nieznajomy"	2013	—	*		—		Comfort and Happiness
"Powiedz mi, że nie chcesz"	2013	—	*		—		Comfort and Happiness
"4:30"	2014	—	*		—		Kamienie na szaniec
"No"	2014	3	*		41		Comfort and Happiness
"W dobrą stronę"	2015	1	*		—	ZPAV: Diamond	Annoyance and Disappointment
"Forest"	2016	—	*		—	ZPAV: Gold	Annoyance and Disappointment
"Pastempomat"	2016	46	65	*	—	ZPAV: 4× Platinum	Annoyance and Disappointment
"Tapety"	2016	—	*		—		Annoyance and Disappointment
"Świadomy sen" (with Sokół)	2017	—	*		—	ZPAV: Platinum	Wojtek Sokół
"Małomiasteczkowy"	2018	1	87	*	—	ZPAV: Diamond	Małomiasteczkowy
"Nie ma fal"	2018	3	*		—	ZPAV: Diamond	Małomiasteczkowy
"Trofea"	2019	1	*		—	ZPAV: Diamond	Małomiasteczkowy
"Najnowszy klip"	2019	1	*		—	ZPAV: Diamond	Małomiasteczkowy
"Za krótki sen" (with Daria Zawiałow)	2021	7	*		—	ZPAV: 3× Platinum	Wojny i noce
"Ostatnia nadzieja" (with Sanah)	2022	1	19	3	—	ZPAV: Diamond	Uczta
"Post"	2022	12	*	7	—	ZPAV: 2× Platinum	Lata dwudzieste
"Let You Down"	2022	—	*	—	—	ZPAV: Gold	Cyberpunk: Edgerunners
"To co masz Ty!"	2022	1	12	3	—	ZPAV: Diamond	Lata dwudzieste
"Dobranocpapa"	2023	—	*	—	—		Non-album single
"Mori"	2023	1	3	2	—	ZPAV: Diamond	Lata dwudzieste
"Tazosy"	2023	4	29	5	—	ZPAV: 2× Platinum	Lata dwudzieste
"Diable"	2023	8	64	10	—	ZPAV: Platinum	Lata dwudzieste
"Phantom Liberty" (with P.T. Adamczyk)	2023	—	89	—	—		Cyberpunk 2077: Phantom Liberty
"Halo"	2023	20	—	11	—	ZPAV: Gold	Lata dwudzieste
"Nie lubię Cię"	2024	6	—	8	—	ZPAV: Platinum	Lata dwudzieste
"Pięknie płyniesz"	2024	1	7	8	—	ZPAV: Platinum	Non-album single
"Samoloty" (with Kaśka Sochacka)	2025	2	7	4	—	ZPAV: Platinum	Tylko haj
"Nadprzestrzenie" (with Kaśka Sochacka)	2025	—	13	12	—	ZPAV: Gold	Tylko haj
"W kilometrach" (with Kaśka Sochacka)	2025	4	27	—	—	ZPAV: Gold	Tylko haj
"Sezon"	2026	2	4	2	—	ZPAV: Gold	TBA
"Na błysk"	2026	1	11	8	—	ZPAV: Gold	TBA
"—" denotes items which were not released in that country or failed to chart. "*" denotes the chart did not exist at that time.

=== As featured artist ===
List of singles as a featured artist, with selected chart positions and certifications, showing year released and album name
Title	Year	Peak chart positions			Certifications	Album
Title	Year	POL Air.	POL Stream.	POL Billb.	Certifications	Album
"Elektryczny" (Męskie Granie Orkiestra; Smolik featuring Brodka and Dawid Podsiadło)	2014	—	*			Męskie Granie 2014
"Niedopowieści" (Patrick the Pan featuring Dawid Podsiadło)	2015	—	*			...niczym jak liśćmi
"Codzienność" (Ten Typ Mes featuring Dawid Podsiadło)	2016	—	*			Ała.
"Wataha" (Męskie Granie Orkiestra featuring Tomasz Organek, O.S.T.R. and Dawid Podsiadło)	2016	—	*			Męskie Granie 2016
"BŁYSK.adło" (Hey featuring Dawid Podsiadło)	2017	—	*			Non-album single
"Początek" (Męskie Granie Orkiestra featuring Kortez, Dawid Podsiadło and Krzysztof Zalewski)	2018	2	*		ZPAV: Diamond	Męskie Granie 2018
"Nikt" (Flirtini featuring Bitamina and Dawid Podsiadło)	2018	—	*			Heartbreaks & Promises vol. 4
"Numer" (Rasmentalism featuring Dawid Podsiadło and Vito Bambino)	2020	—	*			Geniusz
"I Ciebie też, bardzo" (Męskie Granie Orkiestra featuring Daria Zawiałow, Dawid Podsiadło and Vito Bambino)	2021	1	49	*	ZPAV: 2× Diamond	Męskie Granie 2021
"Nikt tak pięknie nie mówił, że się boi miłości" (Męskie Granie Orkiestra featuring Daria Zawiałow and Dawid Podsiadło)	2021	—	*		ZPAV: Platinum	Męskie Granie 2021
"Małgośka" (Męskie Granie Orkiestra; Vito Bambino featuring Daria Zawiałow and Dawid Podsiadło)	2021	—	*		ZPAV: Gold	Męskie Granie 2021
"Yeti" (Artur Rojek featuring Dawid Podsiadło)	2026	—	74	—		Chciałbym urodzić się żeby latałem
"—" denotes items which were not released in that country or failed to chart. "*" denotes the chart did not exist at that time.

=== Promotional singles ===
List of promotional singles, showing year released and album name
Title	Year	Album
"Your Song"	2012	Non-album single
"With or Without You"	2012	Non-album single
"Can't Take My Eyes Off You"	2012	Non-album single
"Girl, You'll Be a Woman Soon"	2012	Non-album single
"Cry Me a River"	2012	Non-album single
"One and Only"	2012	Non-album single
"Every Teardrop Is a Waterfall"	2012	Non-album single
"Diagram" (with Flirtini)	2015	Non-album single
"Where Did Your Love Go?"	2016	Annoyance and Disappointment
"Matylda" (Live)	2019	EP (na żywo, akustycznie)
"Najnowszy klip" (Live)	2019	EP (na żywo, akustycznie)
"Trójkąty i kwadraty" (Live)	2019	EP (na żywo, akustycznie)
"Lis" (Pro8l3m Remix)	2019	Non-album single

=== Other charted and certified songs ===
List of other charted songs, with certifications, showing year released and album name
Title	Year	Peak chart positions			Certifications	Album
Title	Year	POL Air.	POL Stream.	POL Billb.	Certifications	Album
"Bela"	2016	—	*		ZPAV: Gold	Annoyance and Disappointment
"Project 19"	2016	—	*		ZPAV: Gold	Annoyance and Disappointment 2.0
"Cantate Tutti"	2018	—	*		ZPAV: Gold	Małomiasteczkowy
"Dżins"	2018	—	*		ZPAV: 2× Platinum	Małomiasteczkowy
"Lis"	2018	—	*		ZPAV: Platinum	Małomiasteczkowy
"Co mówimy?"	2018	—	*		ZPAV: Gold	Małomiasteczkowy
"Nie kłami"	2018	—	*		ZPAV: 2× Diamond	Małomiasteczkowy
"Matylda"	2018	—	*		ZPAV: 3× Platinum	Małomiasteczkowy
"W piątki leżę w wannie" (Taco Hemingway featuring Dawid Podsiadło)	2019	63	*			Pocztówka z WWA, lato '19
"Freon" (PRO8L3M featuring Dawid Podsiadło)	2021	—	*		ZPAV: Platinum	Fight Club
"Kosmiczne energie" (with Ralph Kaminski)	2021	—	*		ZPAV: Gold	Leśna muzyka (live, czyli na żywo)
"Mieć czy być" (Męskie Granie Orkiestra featuring Daria Zawiałow, Dawid Podsiadło and Vito Bambino)	2021	—	*		ZPAV: Gold	Męskie Granie 2021
"Wirus"	2022	—	*	4	ZPAV: Platinum	Lata dwudzieste
"O czym śnisz?" (featuring Sanah)	2022	—	*	6	ZPAV: Platinum	Lata dwudzieste
"Blant"	2022	—	*	16	ZPAV: Gold	Lata dwudzieste
"Millenium"	2022	—	*	12	ZPAV: Platinum	Lata dwudzieste
"Awejniak" (featuring Nosowska)	2022	—	*	18	ZPAV: Gold	Lata dwudzieste
"Szarość i róż"	2022	—	*	14	ZPAV: 2× Platinum	Lata dwudzieste
"Ulek i Dawcia" (Vito Bambino featuring Dawid Podsiadło)	2023	—	41	—	ZPAV: Gold	Pracownia
"Całe lata" (Taco Hemingway featuring Dawid Podsiadło)	2023	—	2	2	ZPAV: 2× Platinum	1-800-Oświecenie
"Długość dźwięku samotności (na żywo, Stadion Śląski 2022)" (with Artur Rojek)	2024	—	—	—	ZPAV: Gold	Lata dwudzieste z kawałkiem
"Mosty" (with Kaśka Sochacka)	2025	—	39	—		Tylko haj
"Tylko haj" (with Kaśka Sochacka)	2025	—	52	—		Tylko haj
"Boysboysboys" (with Kaśka Sochacka)	2025	—	61	—		Tylko haj
"Bluza taty" (Oki featuring Dawid Podsiadło)	2026	—	11	7		Reklamacja'47
"—" denotes items which were not released in that country or failed to chart. "*" denotes the chart did not exist at that time.

=== Guest appearances ===
List of non-single guest appearances, with other performing artists, showing year released and album name
Title	Year	Other artist(s)	Album
"Heart Pounding"	2012	Karolina Kozak	Homemade
"To co czujesz, to co wiesz"	2014	Męskie Granie Orkiestra 2014	Męskie Granie 2014
"Koła"	2016	Taco Hemingway	Wosk
"Synapses"	2016	Duit	Now I'm Here
"Where Did Your Love Go?"	2016	—N/a	Męskie Granie 2016
"Lipstick on the Glass"	2016	Męskie Granie Orkiestra 2016	Męskie Granie 2016
"Butelki z benzyną i kamienie"	2016	Męskie Granie Orkiestra 2016	Męskie Granie 2016
"Nic nie może przecież wiecznie trwać"	2016	Męskie Granie Orkiestra 2016	Męskie Granie 2016
"Co mi Panie dasz"	2016	Męskie Granie Orkiestra 2016	Męskie Granie 2016
"Tamagotchi" (Remix)	2018	Taconafide	0,25 mg
"Spółdzielnia"	2018	Lao Che	Męskie Granie 2018
"Chłopcy"	2018	Męskie Granie Orkiestra 2018	Męskie Granie 2018
"Peron"	2018	Męskie Granie Orkiestra 2018	Męskie Granie 2018
"Sorry Polsko"	2018	Męskie Granie Orkiestra 2018	Męskie Granie 2018
"Keskese"	2018	Męskie Granie Orkiestra 2018	Męskie Granie 2018
"Nie mam dla ciebie miłości"	2018	Męskie Granie Orkiestra 2018	Męskie Granie 2018
"Co tak wyje?"	2018	Męskie Granie Orkiestra 2018	Męskie Granie 2018
"Minus 10 w Rio"	2018	Męskie Granie Orkiestra 2018	Męskie Granie 2018
"Granda"	2018	Męskie Granie Orkiestra 2018	Męskie Granie 2018
"Ostatni"	2018	Męskie Granie Orkiestra 2018	Męskie Granie 2018
"Andrzej Gołota"	2018	Męskie Granie Orkiestra 2018	Męskie Granie 2018
"Wyspa, drzewo, zamek"	2018	Męskie Granie Orkiestra 2018	Męskie Granie 2018
"Niezwyciężony"	2018	Męskie Granie Orkiestra 2018	Męskie Granie 2018
"Szare miraże"	2018	Męskie Granie Orkiestra 2018	Męskie Granie 2018
"Santa Muerte"	2018	Brodka	MTV Unplugged
"W piątki leżę w wannie"	2019	Taco Hemingway	Pocztówka z WWA, lato '19
"Sanatorium"	2019	Taco Hemingway, Rosalie.	Pocztówka z WWA, lato '19
"Dobrze"	2020	Paulina Przybysz	Odwilż
"Freon"	2021	PRO8L3M, Duit	Fight Club
"Ten wasz świat"	2021	Męskie Granie Orkiestra 2021	Męskie Granie 2021
"Warszawa"	2021	Męskie Granie Orkiestra 2021	Męskie Granie 2021
"Mieć czy być"	2021	Męskie Granie Orkiestra 2021	Męskie Granie 2021
"Śpij kochanie, śpij"	2021	Męskie Granie Orkiestra 2021	Męskie Granie 2021
"Psalm stojących w kolejce"	2021	Męskie Granie Orkiestra 2021	Męskie Granie 2021
"Kryzysowa narzeczona"	2021	Męskie Granie Orkiestra 2021	Męskie Granie 2021
"Oczy kamienic"	2021	Męskie Granie Orkiestra 2021	Męskie Granie 2021
"Spokój"	2021	Męskie Granie Orkiestra 2021	Męskie Granie 2021
"Załoga G"	2021	Męskie Granie Orkiestra 2021	Męskie Granie 2021
"Siłacz"	2021	Męskie Granie Orkiestra 2021	Męskie Granie 2021
"Najnowszy klip"	2021	—N/a	Męskie Granie 2021
"Ulek i Dawcia"	2023	Vito Bambino	Pracownia
"Całe lata"	2023	Taco Hemingway	1-800-Oświecenie
"Bluza taty"	2026	Oki	Reklamacja'47
