= Ania (singer) =

Polish singer-songwriter and composer

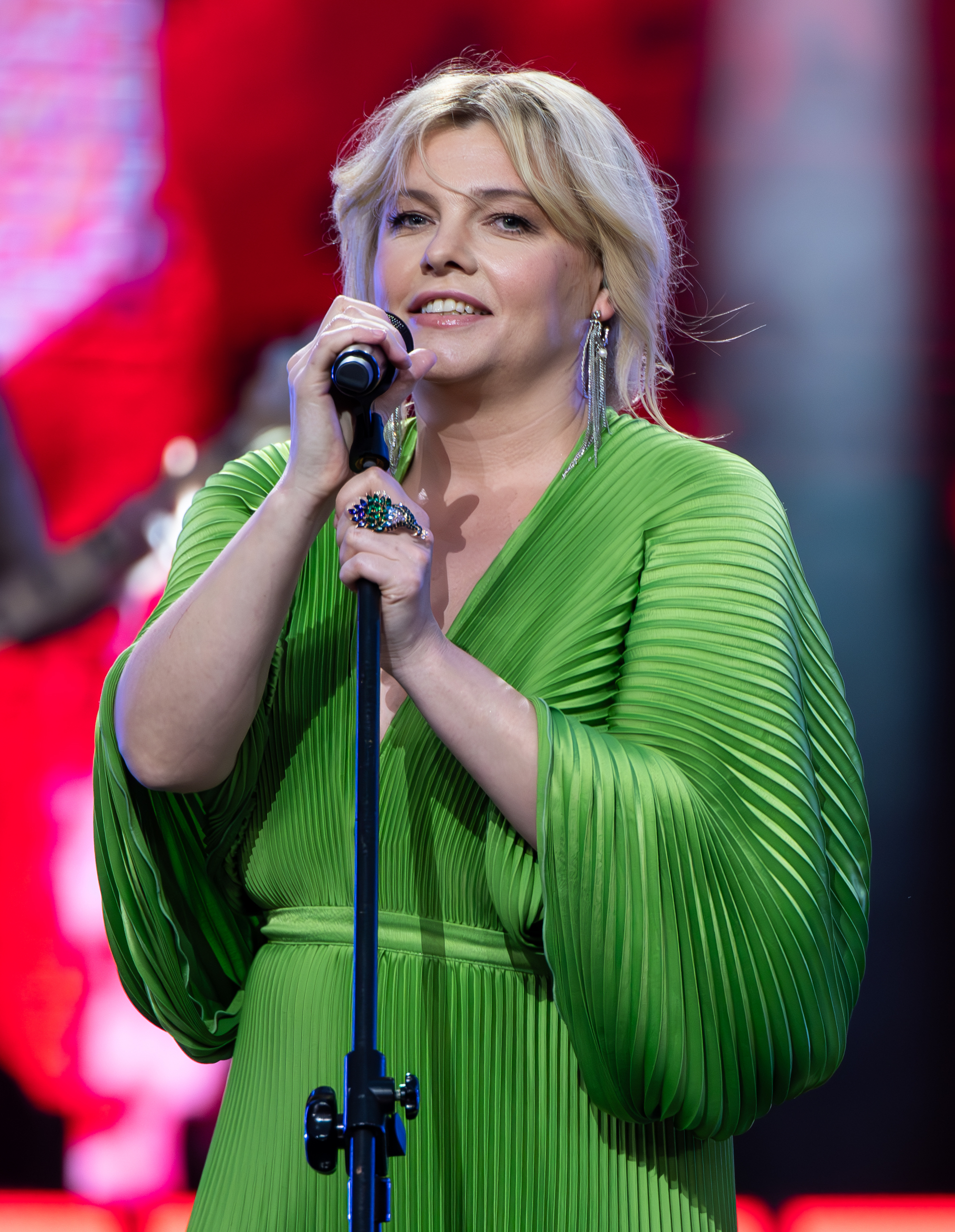
- Ania performing live in 2024
- Born: Anna Dąbrowska; 7 January 1981 (age 45); Chełm, Poland
- Occupations: Singer; songwriter; producer
- Musical career
- Genres: Pop, Soul, Jazz, Blues
- Years active: 2002–present
- Labels: BMG Poland; Sony BMG Music Entertainment Poland; Sony Music Entertainment Poland; Jazzboy Records
- Website: www.aniadabrowska.com

Anna Monika "Ania" Dąbrowska ([ˈaɲa dɔmˈbrɔvska]; born 7 January 1981), usually referred to as Ania ([ˈaɲa]), is a Polish singer, songwriter, and composer performing pop music.

Ania rose to stardom in 2004 with the release of Samotność po zmierzchu which was met with positive critical and commercial reception. The second album, Kilka historii na ten sam temat, was her first to fully incorporate retro style. Ania went on to explore the 1960s aesthetics on two more albums as well as in her visuals and personal image. She is one of the most nominated artists to Fryderyk, the most important music award in Poland, and has been awarded eight times. Ania has released five studio albums, with four of them reaching number one position in Polish albums chart and four going Platinum. As of 2011, the singer has sold more than 200,000 albums in Poland.

== Biography ==
Dąbrowska was born in Chełm, Poland, and started her musical education as a teenager. When in high school, Ania also attended music school where she learned to play contrabass and participated in numerous vocal competitions. She later studied in Warsaw School of Social Sciences and Humanities. Dąbrowska first appeared publicly in 2002, as a participant of the vocal talent show Idol which was the first Polish edition of Pop Idol. She managed to reach the final top 10, but was eliminated while in eighth place. In the same year, she collaborated with Polish singer Krzysztof Krawczyk on his hit album ...bo marzę i śnię. In 2003, Ania released her first solo single, "I See", which was a very modest success.

In February 2004, Dąbrowska released her debut album, Samotność po zmierzchu, which was a blend of pop, soul and jazz. The record, preceded by a hit single "Tego chciałam", was a commercial and critical success. The singer took part in National Festival of Polish Song in Opole with "Glory", followed by even more successful singles, "Charlie, Charlie", which was a cover of an A Camp song, and "Inna", a song about an alienated girl. In the fall 2004, Samotność po zmierzchu achieved Gold certification in Poland for the overall sales exceeding 40,000 copies. Dąbrowska earned the status of one of the most popular Polish singers and was awarded with three Fryderyks and one Eska Award.

Having contributed vocals and written songs for such artists as Maryla Rodowicz and Monika Brodka, Dąbrowska released her second album Kilka historii na ten sam temat in autumn 2006. The album referenced 1960s both musically and visually, with Ania introducing her retro-inspired image on the cover of the record as well as in the music video for the first single "Trudno mi się przyznać". The song became a major radio hit in Poland and was followed by an equally successful "Czekam...". The album matched the success of the debut record and was praised by both the critics and the public. It became Platinum by shifting more than 50,000 copies and earned the singer four Fryderyks and one Eska Award.

Ania's third album, W spodniach czy w sukience?, was released in June 2008. "Nigdy więcej nie tańcz ze mną" was chosen as the first single, with the music video directed by Dąbrowska herself, and enjoyed considerable success in Poland. The album reached number one in Polish albums chart and eventually went Platinum. The title song and "Smutek mam we krwi" were released as singles and met with minor success. In 2009, Ania collaborated with a French band Nouvelle Vague and contributed vocals for their cover of Robert Palmer's classic song "Johnny and Mary". The song was a radio single in Poland and was included on the Polish edition of Nouvelle Vague's album 3. In the fall, her next solo single was released, "Nigdy nie mów nigdy", from the movie of the same name, and became a radio hit.

In April 2010, Dąbrowska released her fourth studio album, Ania Movie, which included interpretations of her favourite movie and TV series tracks, and declared it her last retro-inspired album. Ania Movie debuted at number one in Polish albums chart and remained atop for seven weeks. The first music video was shot for Cher's "Bang Bang (My Baby Shot Me Down)" and second for Badly Drawn Boy's "Silent Sigh". The promotional Ania Movie tour was postponed due to a number of reasons, including pregnancy and health problems, but eventually turned out a great success later in 2010. In July, her first child, Stanisław, was born. In 2011, Ania became a judge in The Voice of Poland.

Autumn 2012 saw the release of Ania's fifth studio album, Bawię się świetnie. It received positive reviews and a Platinum certification, although was her first not to reach the top of the chart. The first single became "Bawię się świetnie" which met with success on Polish radio and in March 2013 second official single was released, "Jeszcze ten jeden raz". Ania's second child, Mela, was born later in 2013. 2014 saw her embark on a successful tour commemorating the 10th anniversary of the release of Samotność po zmierzchu.

== Discography ==
=== Studio albums ===
Title	Album details	Peak chart positions	Sales	Certifications
Title	Album details	POL	Sales	Certifications
Samotność po zmierzchu	Released: 23 February 2004; Label: BMG Poland; Formats: CD(+CD), LP, digital download	1	POL: 50,000+	POL: Gold
Kilka historii na ten sam temat	Released: 16 October 2006; Label: Sony BMG Music Entertainment Poland; Formats: CD, LP, digital download	1	POL: 50,000+	POL: Platinum
W spodniach czy w sukience?	Released: 16 June 2008; Label: Sony BMG Music Entertainment Poland; Formats: CD, LP, digital download	1	POL: 50,000+	POL: Platinum
Ania Movie	Released: 2 April 2010; Label: Sony Music Entertainment Poland; Formats: CD(+CD), LP, digital download	1	POL: 60,000+	POL: Platinum
Bawię się świetnie	Released: 19 October 2012; Label: Jazzboy Records; Formats: CD(+CD), LP, digital download	2	POL: 30,000+	POL: Platinum
Dla naiwnych marzycieli	Released: 4 March 2016; Label: Sony Music Entertainment Poland	1	POL: 60,000+	POL: 2× Platinum
"—" denotes a recording that did not chart or was not released in that territory.

=== EPs ===
Title	EP details
Live	Released: 10 April 2010; Label: Jazzboy Records; Formats: CD
Bang Bang	Released: 10 April 2010; Label: Jazzboy Records; Formats: CD

=== Compilation albums ===
Title	EP details
The Best of	Released: 10 November 2017; Label: Sony Music Entertainment; Formats: CD, LP

=== Music videos ===
Year	Title	Director	Album
2004	"Tego chciałam"	Bo Martin	Samotność po zmierzchu
2004	"Glory"	Iza Poniatowska	Samotność po zmierzchu
2004	"Nie ma nic w co mógłbyś wierzyć"	Marta Pruska	Samotność po zmierzchu
2006	"Trudno mi się przyznać"	Kama Czudowska and Miguel Nieto	Kilka historii na ten sam temat
2007	"Musisz wierzyć"	Adrian Panek	Kilka historii na ten sam temat
2008	"Nigdy więcej nie tańcz ze mną"	Ania Dąbrowska	W spodniach czy w sukience?
2008	"W spodniach czy w sukience"	Ania Dąbrowska	W spodniach czy w sukience?
2009	"Smutek mam we krwi"	Ania Dąbrowska and Bo Martin	W spodniach czy w sukience?
2009	"Nigdy nie mów nigdy"	Mirosław Kuba Brożek	Nigdy nie mów nigdy (soundtrack)
2010	"Bang Bang"	2 DajREKTORS	Ania Movie
2010	"Silent Sigh"	Bo Martin	Ania Movie
2012	"Bawię się świetnie"	Marta Pruska	Bawię się świetnie
2013	"Jeszcze ten jeden raz"	Artur Faryna	Bawię się świetnie
2016	"W głowie"	Ania Dąbrowska	Dla naiwnych marzycieli
2016	"Poskładaj mnie"	Małgorzata Suwała	Dla naiwnych marzycieli
2017	"Porady na zdrady (Dreszcze)"	Mirosław Kuba Brożek	Porady na zdrady (soundtrack) / The Best of
2017	"Nieprawda"	Grupa 13	The Best of
2018	"Serce nie sługa"	Pascal Pawliszewski	Serce nie sługa (soundtrack)
2019	"Lęk"	Sebastian Graboś	Out

=== Other appearances ===
Song(s)	Year	Album
"Nothing Is Forever" "Now" "Eyes Without a Face" "So Close to Say I'm Happy"	2006	Silver Rocket – Unhappy Songs
"I Say a Little Prayer"	2006	Gala duetów (V/A)
"W biegu"	2006	Liroy – L Niño vol. 1
"Płyń"	2007	Jacek Lachowicz – Za morzami
"Bonnie & Clyde"	2007	Tomasz Makowiecki – Ostatnie wspólne zdjęcie
"Johnny and Mary"	2009	Nouvelle Vague – 3
"Nigdy nie mów nigdy"	2009	Nigdy nie mów nigdy (soundtrack)
"Babskie gad-anie"	2011	Ania Rusowicz – Mój Big-Bit
"Niebieski parasol"	2012	Kielich – Dziecko szczęścia
"Waitin'"	2012	June – July Stars
"Leather and Lace"	2013	L.Stadt – You Gotta Move
"On ciągle walczył"	2017	Krzysztof Krawczyk – Duety
