= OLiS =

Polish albums sales chart

OLiS (Oficjalna Lista Sprzedaży; English: Official Sales Chart) is the official chart of the 100 highest selling music albums in Poland. The chart exists since 23 October 2000 and is provided by ZPAV.

Until January 2023 the chart consisted of 50 albums, based only on physical sale. Since January 2023 the chart consists of 100 albums and is based on both physical sale (compiled by Kantar Polska) and listeners in four streaming services (compiled by Ranger agency): Spotify, YouTube (including YouTube Music and YouTube Premium), Apple Music and Deezer.

== List of number-one albums ==
2000	2001	2002	2003	2004	2005	2006	2007	2008	2009
2010	2011	2012	2013	2014	2015	2016	2017	2018	2019
2020	2021	2022	2023	2024	2025	2026

== See also ==
- Polish music charts
- List of number-one singles in Poland
- List of number-one dance singles in Poland
