= Romantic Psycho =

Studio album by Quebonafide
- Released: 1 April 2020
- Recorded: 2017–2020
- Genres: Hip hop, pop, pop-rap
- Length: 61:23 (EU Edition) 71:09 (Japan Edition) 41:07 (Romantic Psycho)
- Label: QueQuality

Quebonafide chronology
0,25 mg (2018)	Romantic Psycho (2020)	Północ / południe (2025)

Romantic Psycho (stylized in all caps) is the fourth studio album by Polish rapper Quebonafide. It was released on April 1, 2020 by his own label QueQuality.

Romantic Psycho debuted at number one on Polish sales list OLiS. The album was the best-selling album of 2020 in Poland. It sold 30,000 copies in pre-sales, earning platinum status. The album would go on to sell over 150,000 copies and be certified diamond.

As part of the promotion, Quebonafide embarked on a tour entitled Romantic Psycho Experience.

== Background ==
In September 2018, the rapper disappeared from social media, and in an interview he spoke about his new album, "Now I'm planning a very exhibitionist album - much more than anything I've recorded so far, a kind of "Zorza" times ten, and I'll have to focus a lot and remember certain events and emotions. Writing such things has a therapeutic effect on me, and I think that's how it should work." The rapper returned in 2018 with the release of an album with Taco Hemingway titled Soma 0.5 mg, which sold 150,000 copies and was certified diamond, as well as ending the year with a joint tour selling out the largest halls in Poland titled Ekodiesel Tour. In September 2018, rapper Mac Miller, of whom the musician was a big fan, passed away. In the wake of his death, the rapper wrote on Instagram that he was devastated by it and announced another career break.

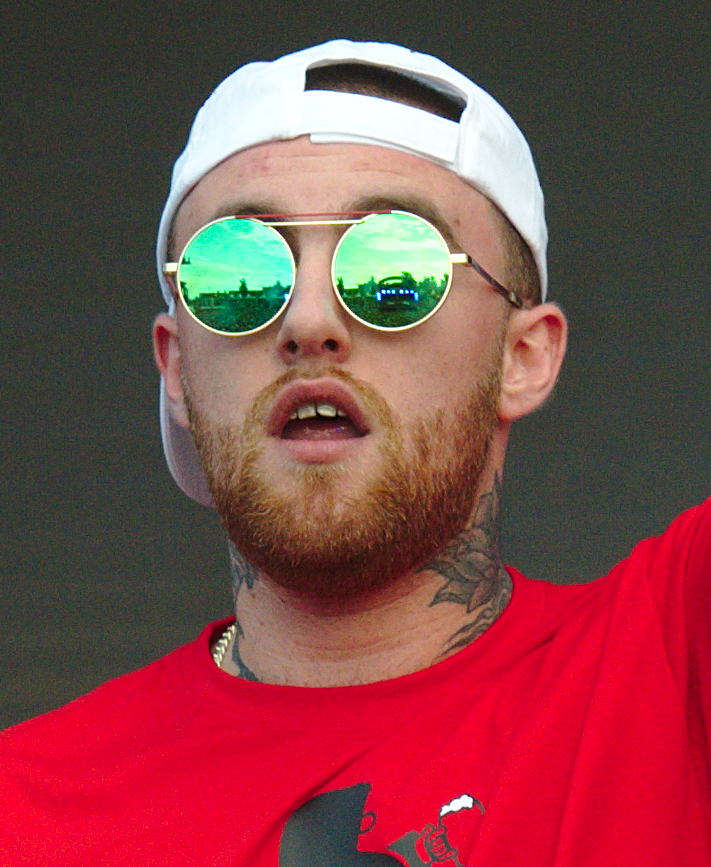
Mac Miller's death was the cause of Quebonafide's mental breakdown and career break.

On 7 February 2020 he released the first single "Romantic Psycho" in which, together with Taco Hemingway, the rapper settled his past and talked about his relationship with Natalia Szroeder. On 10 February he released another single in a depressive climate, along with a music video "Jesień" with a guest appearance by Natalia Szroeder, and pre-sales of the album titled Romantic Psycho have begun. The rapper in the music video and on the album cover showed a completely changed image, the tattoos disappeared from his body, and by the very look he resembled himself in his student days. On 15 February 2020 the musician appeared on Dzień Dobry TVN, where he presented his new image. The rapper, usually known for his crazy and explosive character, presented himself as a quiet and shy boy. The rapper also announced his tour to promote his album titled Romantic Psycho Experience, which he himself called an "experience" rather than a tour. The rapper also announced his participation in the Jeden z dziesięciu show and an appearance on Kuba Wojewódzki's talk show. However, due to a coronavirus outbreak, the tour as well as the episodes were postponed. The rapper also presented his new image on Instagram by showing comical and ill-fitting photos of the star, with him appearing in the same clothes in each photo. As part of the promotion, the cover photo of the artist appeared on the cover of the publisher Technopol's crossword puzzles, and the cover photo appeared on a mural at the Politechnika subway station in Warsaw. On 19 February the rapper gave an interview to newonce in which he freestyled live; the interview video has garnered a couple of million views on YouTube. On 13 March he released a single "Przytobie", where the rapper chastised Polish stand-ups, celebrities and the divisions in Polish hip-hop. The musician initially announced the album's release on 20 March, but after a few days he said that he had mistaken the release date and the album would be released on 27 March 2020. Also on 17 March he appeared in an Allegro commercial, where he donated the entire proceeds of the ad, one million zlotys, to charity.

On 1 April 2020 he released a single "Szubienicapestycydybroń", with a music video in which Quebonafide abandons his quiet boy style and tattoos appear on his body again. In the single, he attacks the actor Sebastian Fabijański, among others. Thus, it turns out that the first album was only a limited release, and the actual album is starting to reach the public and has appeared on streaming services. The album has been divided into two versions, the first Japanese version with three additional songs, available for pre-order on the rapper's label website. The second is the European version, and was available for purchase at all music stores. As part of the promotion of the album, the rapper released a documentary film titled Quebonafide: Romantic Psycho Film, in which the artist shows the work of creating the new album and behind the scenes of the promotional campaign. The film has been screened in theaters, and tickets have already sold out in advance.

== Track listing ==
Romantic Psycho (EU Edition)
No.	Title	Writer(s)	Producer(s)	Length
1.	"Romantic Psycho" (featuring Taco Hemingway)	Kuba Grabowski, Filip Szcześniak	Mr. Krime	3:36
2.	"Jesień" (featuring Natalia Szroeder)	K. Grabowski	FRXST	3:33
3.	"Przytobie"	K. Grabowski	Patr00	3:31
4.	"Szubienicapestycydybroń"	K. Grabowski, F. Szcześniak	Mr. Krime	4:23
5.	"Tęskniezastarymkanye" (featuring Natalia Szroeder)	K. Grabowski, Natalia Szroeder	Emade	3:05
6.	"Aspartam" (featuring Mata)	K. Grabowski, Michał Matczak	Kacperczyk	3:26
7.	"Cojestmałpy" (featuring Smarki Smark)	K. Grabowski, Jerzy Buczkowski	Kixnare	3:54
8.	"Rumpelstilskin" (featuring Vito Bambino)	K. Grabowski	Emade	3:29
9.	"Gazprom" (featuring Sokół)	K. Grabowski, Jerzy Buczkowski	Czarny HIFI	3:15
10.	"Świattomójplaczabaw" (featuring Sentino)	K. Grabowski, Sebastian Enrique Alvarez	Iad Aslan	2:46
11.	"Ajetlagtomójnowydrag" (featuring Kiełas)	K. Grabowski	Kiełas, FORXST	4:33
12.	"Tokyo2020" (featuring Taco Hemingway)	K. Grabowski, F. Szcześniak	FORXST	3:14
13.	"Niepłaczęponotredame" (featuring Bedoes)	K. Grabowski, Borys Przybylski	Iad Aslan	3:33
14.	"Łajza" (featuring Mrozu)	K. Grabowski	Mrozu	4:03
15.	"Bubbletea" (featuring Daria Zawiałow)	K. Grabowski, Daria Zawiałow	Duit	4:45
16.	"Towszytskobyłodlaciebie" (featuring Ralph Kaminski)	K. Grabowski	Ralph Kaminski	6:17
Total length:				1:01:23

Romantic Psycho (Japan Edition)
No.	Title	Writer(s)	Producer(s)	Length
1.	"Romantic Psycho" (featuring Taco Hemingway)	Kuba Grabowski, Filip Szcześniak	Mr. Krime	3:36
2.	"Jesień" (featuring Natalia Szroeder)	K. Grabowski	FRXST	3:33
3.	"Przytobie"	K. Grabowski	Patr00	3:31
4.	"Szubienicapestycydybroń"	K. Grabowski, F. Szcześniak	Mr. Krime	4:23
5.	"Tęskniezastarymkanye" (featuring Natalia Szroeder)	K. Grabowski, Natalia Szroeder	Emade	3:05
6.	"Aspartam" (featuring Mata)	K. Grabowski, Michał Matczak	Kacperczyk	3:26
7.	"Cojestmałpy" (featuring Smarki Smark)	K. Grabowski, Jerzy Buczkowski	Kixnare	3:54
8.	"Rumpelstilskin" (featuring Bitamina)	K. Grabowski	Emade	3:29
9.	"Gazprom" (featuring Sokół)	K. Grabowski, Jerzy Buczkowski	Czarny HIFI	3:15
10.	"Świattomójplaczabaw" (featuring Sentino)	K. Grabowski, Sebastian Enrique Alvarez	Iad Aslan	2:46
11.	"Ajetlagtomójnowydrag" (featuring Kiełas)	K. Grabowski	Kiełas, FORXST	4:33
12.	"Tokyo2020" (featuring Taco Hemingway)	K. Grabowski, F. Szcześniak	FORXST	3:14
13.	"Niepłaczęponotredame" (featuring Bedoes)	K. Grabowski, Borys Przybylski	Iad Aslan	3:33
14.	"Łajza" (featuring Mrozu)	K. Grabowski	Mrozu	4:03
15.	"Bubbletea" (featuring Daria Zawiałow)	K. Grabowski, Daria Zawiałow	Duit	4:45
16.	"Towszytskobyłodlaciebie" (featuring Ralph Kaminski)	K. Grabowski	Ralph Kaminski	6:17
17.	"Jestemkurwaczarodziejem"	K. Grabowski	Mr. Krime	2:41
18.	"Złotegloby" (featuring Kukon)	K. Grabowski, Jakub Konopka	FORXST	3:02
19.	"Człowiekzksiężyca"	K. Grabowski	Hatti Vatti	4:19
Total length:				1:11:25

== Charts ==
Chart (2020)	Peak position
Polish Albums (OLiS)	1
