= Orange Warsaw Festival =

Polish annual music festival

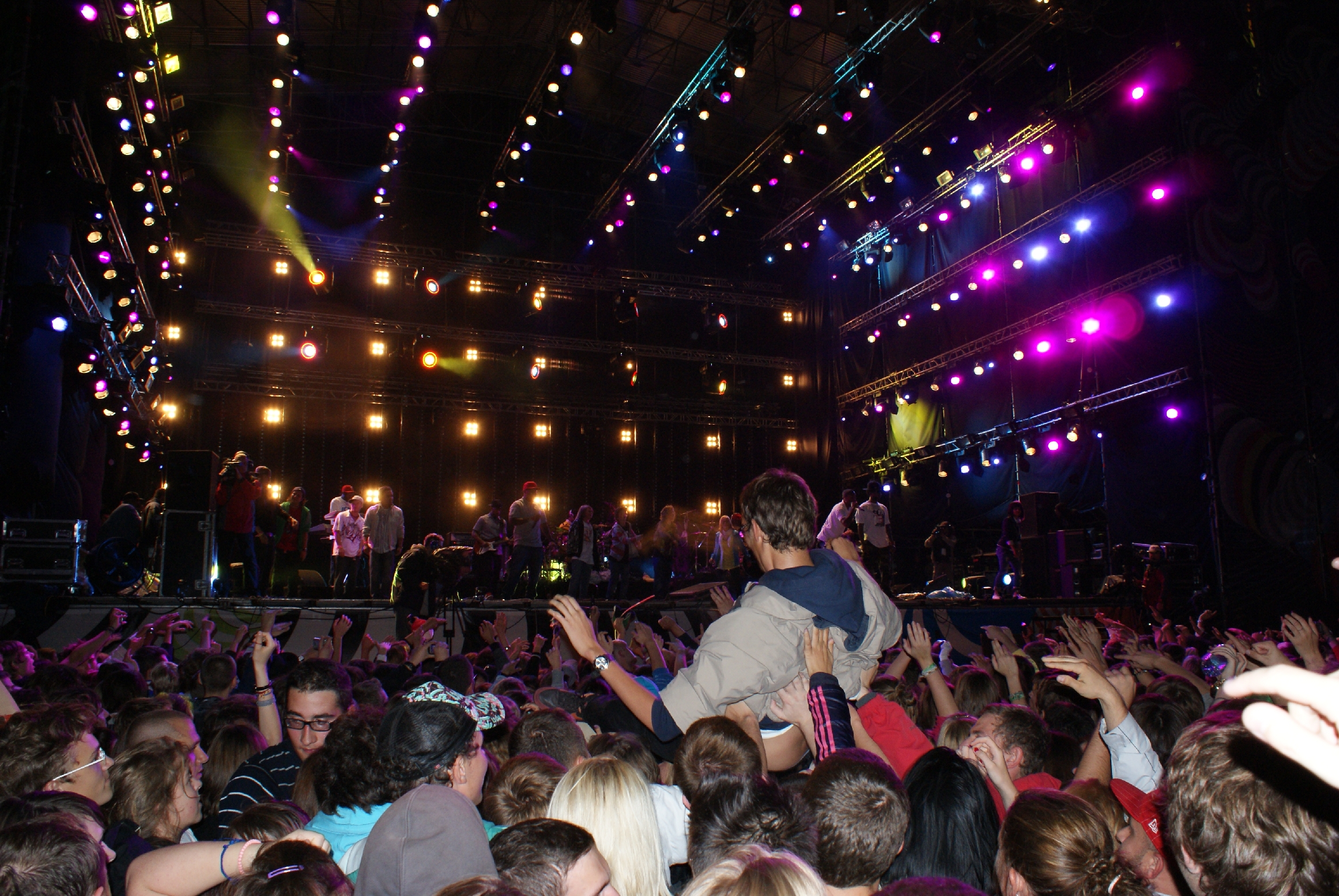
- Orange Warsaw Festival in 2009
- Locations: Parade Square (2008–2009); Racetrack Służewiec (2010; 2015–present); Polish Army Stadium (2011); Stadion Narodowy (2013–2014)
- Years active: 2008–present
- Founders: Orange; TVN
- Website: orangewarsawfestival.pl

Orange Warsaw Festival is a Polish annual music festival. As of 2026, it has been held seventeen times since its inception in 2008. (Note: The 2020 and 2021 editions were cancelled due to the COVID-19 pandemic) Since 2015, it has been taking place at the Racetrack Służewiec, where it was also held in 2010; previous venues include Parade Square (2008–2009), the Polish Army Stadium (2011) and Stadion Narodowy (2013–2014). Television broadcasts have been provided by TVN since 2010.

== Artists ==
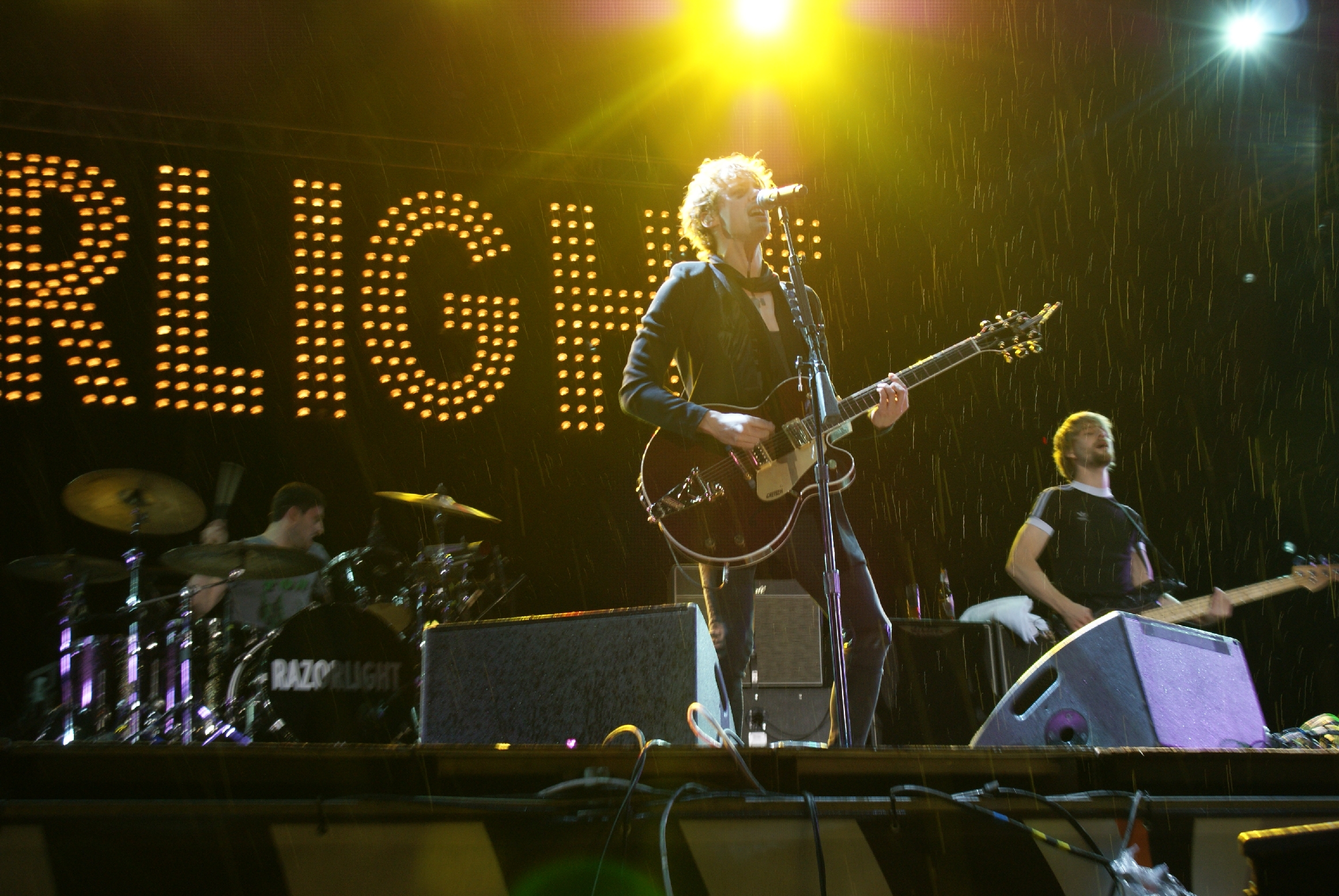
Razorlight at the 2009 edition of Orange Warsaw Festival

=== 2008 ===
Saturday 6 September:
Stage A: Apollo 440, Wyclef Jean, Kelly Rowland, a tribute to Tadeusz Nalepa (Jan Borysewicz, Maciej Silski, Piotr Nalepa, Piotr Cugowski)
Stage B: Teddybears, Cafe Fogg, Rita

=== 2009 ===
Friday 4 September:
Main Stage: Maria Sadowska, Ja Confetti, Smolik Project Big Band, Razorlight

Saturday 5 September:
Main Stage: Afromental, June, The Crystal Method, N.E.R.D., Groove Armada Live
Young Stage: Orange Passion, Out of Tune, Skinny Patrini, Plastic, Calvin Harris, MGMT

=== 2010 ===
Saturday 28 August:
Kumka Olik, Kim Nowak, White Lies, Courtney Love & Hole, Edyta Bartosiewicz

Sunday 29 August:
Aura Dione, Lisa Hannigan, Monika Brodka, Mika, Agnieszka Chylińska, Nelly Furtado

=== 2011 ===
Saturday 17 June:
Piotr Lisiecki, FOX, Michał Szpak, My Chemical Romance, Skunk Anansie, Moby

Sunday 17 June:
Sistars, Plan B, The Streets, Jamiroquai

=== 2012 ===
Saturday 9 June:
Fisz Emade Tworzywo, De La Soul, Garbage, Linkin Park

Sunday 10 June:
Clock Machine, Power of Trinity, Kamp!, Ms Lauryn Hill, The Prodigy, Groove Armada DJ Set

=== 2013 ===
Saturday 25 May:
OCN, Tinie Tempah, Basement Jaxx, Beyoncé

Sunday 26 May:
Lipali, Cypress Hill, The Offspring, Fatboy Slim

=== 2014 ===
Friday 13 June:
Orange Stage: French Films, Pixies, Queens of the Stone Age, Kings of Leon
Warsaw Stage: The Pretty Reckless, Jamal, Ska-P, Lily Allen, Snoop Dogg, Martin Garrix
Rochstar Crew Tent: Fair Weather Friends

Saturday 14 June:
Orange Stage: Bombay Bicycle Club, The Wombats, The Kooks, Florence + The Machine
Warsaw Stage: Ella Eyre, Skubas, Rita Ora, Hurts, The Prodigy, Chase & Status DJ Set
Rochstar Crew Tent: Organek

Sunday 15 June:
Orange Stage: Miles Kane, The 1975, Kasabian, Outkast, David Guetta
Warsaw Stage: Chemia, I Am Giant, Bring me the Horizon, Jurassic 5, Limp Bizkit
Rochstar Crew Tent: Xxanaxx

=== 2015 ===
Friday 12 June:
Orange Stage: Wolf Alice, Twin Atlantic, Crystal Fighters, Hey, Noel Gallagher's High Flying Birds, The Chemical Brothers
Warsaw Stage: Sheppard, Mela Koteluk, Afromental, Three Days Grace, Papa Roach
Rochstar Crew Tent: Terrific Sunday, Agyness B Marry, We Draw A, Kari, Gooral

Saturday 13 June:
Orange Stage: RusT, Palma Violets, Łąki Łan, Paloma Faith, Big Sean, Mark Ronson
Warsaw Stage: Bibobit, Kamp!, Organek, Nosowska, FKA Twigs
Rochstar Crew Tent: Rusty Cage, Young Stadium Club (Mizumono feat. Funk Rockass), Coria, Carrion, Baasch, Molesta Ewenement

Sunday 14 June:
Orange Stage: Birth of Joy, Benjamin Clementine, Metronomy, Bastille, Incubus, Muse
Warsaw Stage: Kadebostany, Bokka, Maria Peszek, Asking Alexandria, Parkway Drive
Rochstar Crew Tent: Zagi, K Bleax (Mizumono feat. Funk Rockass), Lari Lu, Cosovel

=== 2016 ===
Friday 3 June:
Orange Stage: Marcelina, Skunk Anansie, Lana Del Rey, Die Antwoord
Warsaw Stage: Sorry Boys, Xxanaxx, Blossoms, Kaliber 44

Saturday 4 June:
Orange Stage: Tom Odell, MØ, Editors, Schoolboy Q, Skrillex
Warsaw Stage: Bovska, Julia Marcell, Ten Typ Mes, Natalia Przybysz, Daughter

=== 2017 ===
Friday 2 June:
Orange Stage: Kodaline, Years & Years, Kings Of Leon, Martin Garrix
Warsaw Stage: Suumoo, Little Simz, Łona i Webber, Maria Peszek, Kamp!

Saturday 3 June:
Orange Stage: Daria Zawiałow, Two Door Cinema Club, Imagine Dragons, Justice
Warsaw Stage: Rosalie, Lor, Miuosh, You Me At Six, Natalia Nykiel

=== 2018 ===
Friday 1 June:
Orange Stage: Sam Smith, LCD Soundsystem, Dua Lipa, O.S.T.R.
Warsaw Stage: Rasmentalism, Ralph Kamiński, Nines, Sonar, Rebeka

Saturday 2 June:
Orange Stage: Florence + The Machine, Tyler, the Creator, Axwell Λ Ingrosso, Taco Hemingway
Warsaw Stage: Mela Koteluk, The Dumplings, Mery Spolsky, Marcelina, Baranovski

=== 2019 ===
Friday 31 May:
Orange Stage: Marshmello, Solange Knowles, Rita Ora, Quebonafide
Warsaw Stage: Otsochodzi, Bitamina, SG Lewis, Łona i Webber + The Pimps

Saturday 1 June:
Orange Stage: Miley Cyrus, (Note: Cardi B was originally set to headline, but cancelled) Troye Sivan, The Raconteurs, Miles Kane
Warsaw Stage: Julia Pietrucha, Jan-rapowanie, Terrific Sunday, Lor, MIN t

=== 2020 ===
The 2020 edition of the festival was cancelled due to the COVID-19 pandemic. The following are the original dates and headliners:

Friday 5 June: Camila Cabello, 5 Seconds of Summer, Tyler, the Creator, Young Thug
Saturday 6 June: Brockhampton

=== 2021 ===
The 2021 edition of the festival supposed to be held on Friday, June 4 and Saturday June 5. Tyler, The Creator, Young Thug and Brockhapmton were set to perform, however the festival was cancelled due to the COVID-19 pandemic.

=== 2022 ===
Friday, 3 June:
Orange Stage: Tyler, The Creator, Nas, Charli XCX, Joey Badass
Warsaw Stage: Żabson x Young Igi, Szczyl, Kinny Zimmer, Julia Wieniawa, Zalia

Saturday, 4 June:
Orange Stage: Florence + The Machine, Stormzy, Foals, Rosalie.
Warsaw Stage: Sigrid, Karaś/Rogucki, (Note: Earl Sweatshirt was originally set to perform, but cancelled due to flight delay) Kacperczyk, Kukon, Kasia Lins

=== 2023 ===
Friday, 2 June:
Orange Stage: Thirty Seconds To Mars, (Note: Sam Smith was originally set to headline, but cancelled) The Kid Laroi, Zara Larsson, Aurora
Warsaw Stage: Ralph Kamiński, Vito Bambino, Jan-rapowanie, Alina Pash, Daria ze Śląska

Saturday, 3 June:
Orange Stage: Martin Garrix, Ellie Goulding, The 1975, Igo
Warsaw Stage: Oki, Daria Zawiałow, Jann, Otsochodzi, Faustyna Maciejczuk

=== 2024 ===
Friday, 7 June:
Orange Stage: The Prodigy, Skepta, Yungblud, Ken Carson
Warsaw Stage: Kenya Grace, Tommy Cash, Mrozu, Kwiat Jabłoni, Dawid Tyszkowski

Saturday, 8 June:
Orange Stage: Nicki Minaj, Troye Sivan, Jungle, Omar Apollo
Warsaw Stage: Jessie Ware, Libianca, Yeat, PRO8L3M, Kaśka Sochacka, Nita

=== 2025 ===
Friday, 30 May:
Orange Stage: Chappell Roan, Jamie XX, Michael Kiwanuka, Loreen
Warsaw Stage: Jude York, Bambi, Chivas, Hubert., Lordofon

Saturday, 31 May:
Orange Stage: Charli XCX, Marina, Bladee, Szczyl
Warsaw Stage: Barry Can't Swim, Sara James, Margaret, Kuban

=== 2026 ===
Friday, 29 May:
Orange Stage: Lewis Capaldi, Dominic Fike, TV Girl, Pezet
Warsaw Stage: Alessi Rose, Kaz Bałagane, Kasia Lins, Livka, Sarah Julia

Saturday, 30 May:
Orange Stage: Olivia Dean, Blood Orange, FKA Twigs, Jan-rapowanie
Warsaw Stage: Loyle Carner, Bbno$, Sokół, Ganna, Daniel Godson
