= List of number-one singles of 2024 (Poland) =

This is a list of the songs that reached number-one position in official Polish single charts in 2024:

- OLiA (official airplay chart), published by ZPAV
- OLiS – streaming singles, published by ZPAV
- Poland Songs, published by Billboard (as a part of Hits of the World)

== Chart history ==
OLiA – airplay singles			OLiS – streaming singles			Billboard Poland Songs			
Issue date (Note: Last day of week covered by the chart (Saturday to Friday). The chart is published next Monday.)	Song	Artist(s)	Issue date (Note: Last day of week covered by the chart (Friday to Thursday). The chart is published next Thursday.)	Song	Artist(s)	Issue date (Note: Issue date by Billboard (Saturday). The chart covers week starting 15 days earlier (Friday to Thursday).)	Song	Artist(s)	Ref.
						January 6	"Last Christmas"	Wham!	
January 5	"Stumblin' In"	Cyril	January 4	"Erotyczne Pif-Paf"	Figo i Samogony	January 13	"Miki Maus"	Figo i Samogony	
January 12	"Stumblin' In"	Cyril	January 11	"Plaster"	Szpaku	January 20	"Plaster"	Szpaku	
January 19	"Stumblin' In"	Cyril	January 18	"Plaster"	Szpaku	January 27	"Plaster"	Szpaku	
January 26	"Stumblin' In"	Cyril	January 25	"Plaster"	Szpaku	February 3	"Plaster"	Szpaku	
February 2	"Houdini"	Dua Lipa	February 1	"Młody Manson"	Young Multi featuring Szpaku	February 10	"Młody Manson"	Young Multi featuring Szpaku	
February 9	"Stumblin' In"	Cyril	February 8	"Plaster"	Szpaku	February 17	"Plaster"	Szpaku	
February 16	"Stumblin' In"	Cyril	February 15	"Plaster"	Szpaku	February 24	"Plaster"	Szpaku	
February 23	"Stumblin' In"	Cyril	February 22	"Hero"	Kizo and Bletka	March 2	"Hero"	Kizo and Bletka	
March 1	"Stumblin' In"	Cyril	February 29	"Hero"	Kizo and Bletka	March 9	"Hero"	Kizo and Bletka	
March 8	"Stumblin' In"	Cyril	March 7	"Hero"	Kizo and Bletka	March 16	"Hero"	Kizo and Bletka	
March 15	"Motyle"	Sylwia Grzeszczak	March 14	"Hero"	Kizo and Bletka	March 23	"Hero"	Kizo and Bletka	
March 22	"Motyle"	Sylwia Grzeszczak	March 21	"Hero"	Kizo and Bletka	March 30	"Hero"	Kizo and Bletka	
March 29	"Ne rozumiju"	Vixen	March 28	"Drive"	Gibbs featuring Opał	April 6	"Drive"	Gibbs featuring Opał	
April 5	"Ne rozumiju"	Vixen	April 4	"I Like the Way You Kiss Me"	Artemas	April 13	"I Like the Way You Kiss Me"	Artemas	
April 12	"Ne rozumiju"	Vixen	April 11	"Chyba że z Tobą"	Modelki	April 20	"I Like the Way You Kiss Me"	Artemas	
April 19	"Motyle"	Sylwia Grzeszczak	April 18	"Chyba że z Tobą"	Modelki	April 27	"Chyba że z Tobą"	Modelki	
April 26	"Un ragazzo una ragazza"	The Kolors	April 25	"Chyba że z Tobą"	Modelki	May 4	"Chyba że z Tobą"	Modelki	
May 3	"Hip hip hura!"	Sanah	May 2	"Chyba że z Tobą"	Modelki	May 11	"Chyba że z Tobą"	Modelki	
May 10	"The Sound of Silence" (Cyril remix)	Disturbed	May 9	"Chyba że z Tobą"	Modelki	May 18	"Ile lat?"	Oki featuring Sobel	
May 17	"The Sound of Silence" (Cyril remix)	Disturbed	May 16	"Chyba że z Tobą"	Modelki	May 25	"Ile lat?"	Oki featuring Sobel	
May 24	"Złamane serce jest ok"	Daria Zawiałow	May 23	"Chyba że z Tobą"	Modelki	June 1	"Woda księżycowa"	Kubi Producent featuring Stickxr, Bambi and Fukaj	
May 31	"Złamane serce jest ok"	Daria Zawiałow	May 30	"Chyba że z Tobą"	Modelki	June 8	"Chyba że z Tobą"	Modelki	
June 7	"Złamane serce jest ok"	Daria Zawiałow	June 6	"Chyba że z Tobą"	Modelki	June 15	"Chyba że z Tobą"	Modelki	
June 14	"I Like the Way You Kiss Me"	Artemas	June 13	"Chyba że z Tobą"	Modelki	June 22	"Chyba że z Tobą"	Modelki	
June 21	"I Like the Way You Kiss Me"	Artemas	June 20	"100 BPM"	Kizo and Bletka	June 29	"100 BPM"	Kizo and Bletka	
June 28	"I Like the Way You Kiss Me"	Artemas	June 27	"100 BPM"	Kizo and Bletka	July 6	"100 BPM"	Kizo and Bletka	
July 5	"Too Sweet"	Hozier	July 4	"100 BPM"	Kizo and Bletka	July 13	"100 BPM"	Kizo and Bletka	
July 12	"Belong Together"	Mark Ambor	July 11	"100 BPM"	Kizo and Bletka	July 20	"Chyba że z Tobą"	Modelki	
July 19	"Och i ach"	Sylwia Grzeszczak	July 18	"1 na 100"	Mata and White 2115	July 27	"1 na 100"	Mata and White 2115	
July 26	"Belong Together"	Mark Ambor	July 25	"Róż"	Jonatan, Bletka and Gibbs	August 3	"Róż"	Jonatan, Bletka and Gibbs	
August 2	"Och i ach"	Sylwia Grzeszczak	August 1	"Róż"	Jonatan, Bletka and Gibbs	August 10	"Róż"	Jonatan, Bletka and Gibbs	
August 9	"Och i ach"	Sylwia Grzeszczak	August 8	"Róż"	Jonatan, Bletka and Gibbs	August 17	"Róż"	Jonatan, Bletka and Gibbs	
August 16	"Och i ach"	Sylwia Grzeszczak	August 15	"Och i ach"	Sylwia Grzeszczak	August 24	"Róż"	Jonatan, Bletka and Gibbs	
August 23	"Było, minęło"	Sanah	August 22	"Róż"	Jonatan, Bletka and Gibbs	August 31	"Róż"	Jonatan, Bletka and Gibbs	
August 30	"Było, minęło"	Sanah	August 29	"Taki mały ja"	Kuqe 2115	September 7	"Taki mały ja"	Kuqe 2115	
September 6	"Było, minęło"	Sanah	September 5	"Taki mały ja"	Kuqe 2115	September 14	"Taki mały ja"	Kuqe 2115	
September 13	"Tam słońce, gdzie my"	Wiktor Dyduła	September 12	"Madonna"	Bambi	September 21	"Madonna"	Bambi	
September 20	"Tam słońce, gdzie my"	Wiktor Dyduła	September 19	"Madonna"	Bambi	September 28	"Madonna"	Bambi	
September 27	"Tam słońce, gdzie my"	Wiktor Dyduła	September 26	"Lloret de Mar"	Mata	October 5	"Lloret de Mar"	Mata	
October 4	"Tam słońce, gdzie my"	Wiktor Dyduła	October 3	"Lloret de Mar"	Mata	October 12	"Lloret de Mar"	Mata	
October 11	"Róż"	Jonatan, Bletka and Gibbs	October 10	"Lloret de Mar"	Mata	October 19	"Lloret de Mar"	Mata	
October 18	"Róż"	Jonatan, Bletka and Gibbs	October 17	"Lloret de Mar"	Mata	October 26	"Lloret de Mar"	Mata	
October 25	"Róż"	Jonatan, Bletka and Gibbs	October 24	"Lloret de Mar"	Mata	November 2	"Lloret de Mar"	Mata	
November 1	"Ready for Your Love"	Felix Jaehn featuring Sophie Ellis-Bextor	October 31	"Lloret de Mar"	Mata	November 9	"Lloret de Mar"	Mata	
November 8	"Good Luck, Babe!"	Chappell Roan	November 7	"Dolce vita"	Kizo and Bletka featuring Szpaku	November 16	"Dolce vita"	Kizo and Bletka featuring Szpaku	
November 15	"Good Luck, Babe!"	Chappell Roan	November 14	"Dolce vita"	Kizo and Bletka featuring Szpaku	November 23	"Dolce vita"	Kizo and Bletka featuring Szpaku	
November 22	"I Like It"	Alesso and Nate Smith	November 21	"Dolce vita"	Kizo and Bletka featuring Szpaku	November 30	"Dolce vita"	Kizo and Bletka featuring Szpaku	
November 29	"I Like It"	Alesso and Nate Smith	November 28	"Futurama 3 (fanserwis)"	Quebonafide	December 7	"Futurama 3 (fanserwis)"	Quebonafide	
December 6	"Miłość jest ślepa"	Sanah	December 5	"Futurama 3 (fanserwis)"	Quebonafide	December 14	"Futurama 3 (fanserwis)"	Quebonafide	
December 13	"We Pray"	Coldplay featuring Little Simz, Burna Boy, Elyanna and Tini	December 12	"Last Christmas"	Wham!	December 21	"Last Christmas"	Wham!	
December 20	"Bad Dreams"	Teddy Swims	December 19	"Last Christmas"	Wham!	December 28	"Last Christmas"	Wham!	
December 27	"Apt."	Rosé and Bruno Mars	December 26	"Last Christmas"	Wham!				

== Number-one artists ==
=== OLiA ===
List of number-one artists by total weeks at number one
Artist	Weeks at No. 1
Cyril	9
Sylwia Grzeszczak	7
Sanah	5
Wiktor Dyduła	4
Vixen	3
Daria Zawiałow	3
Artemas	3
Jonatan	3
Bletka	3
Gibbs	3
Disturbed	2
Mark Ambor	2
Chappell Roan	2
Alesso	2
Nate Smith	2
Dua Lipa	1
The Kolors	1
Hozier	1
Felix Jaehn	1
Sophie Ellis-Bextor	1
Coldplay	1
Little Simz	1
Burna Boy	1
Elyanna	1
Tini	1
Teddy Swims	1
Rosé	1
Bruno Mars	1

=== OLiS – streaming chart ===
List of number-one artists by total weeks at number one
Artist	Weeks at No. 1
Bletka	16
Kizo	12
Modelki	10
Szpaku	9
Mata	7
Gibbs	5
Jonatan	4
Wham!	3
Kuqe 2115	2
Bambi	2
Quebonafide	2
Figo i Samogony	1
Young Multi	1
Opał	1
Artemas	1
White 2115	1
Sylwia Grzeszczak	1

=== Billboard Poland Songs ===
List of number-one artists by total weeks at number one
Artist	Weeks at No. 1
Bletka	16
Kizo	11
Szpaku	9
Modelki	7
Mata	7
Gibbs	6
Jonatan	5
Bambi	3
Wham!	3
Artemas	2
Oki	2
Sobel	2
Kuqe 2115	2
Quebonafide	2
Figo i Samogony	1
Young Multi	1
Opał	1
Kubi Producent	1
Stickxr	1
Fukaj	1
White 2115	1

== See also ==
- Polish music charts
- List of number-one albums of 2024 (Poland)
