= List of number-one singles of 2026 (Poland) =

This is a list of the songs that reached number-one position in official Polish single charts in 2026:

- OLiA (official airplay chart), published by ZPAV
- OLiS – streaming singles, published by ZPAV
- Poland Songs, published by Billboard (as a part of Hits of the World)

== Chart history ==
OLiA – airplay singles			OLiS – streaming singles			Billboard Poland Songs			
Issue date (Note: Last day of week covered by the chart (Saturday to Friday). The chart is published next Monday.)	Song	Artist(s)	Issue date (Note: Last day of week covered by the chart (Friday to Thursday). The chart is published next Thursday.)	Song	Artist(s)	Issue date (Note: Issue date by Billboard (Saturday). The chart covers week starting 15 days earlier (Friday to Thursday).)	Song	Artist(s)	Ref.
						January 3	"Last Christmas"	Wham!	
January 2	"Turn the Lights Off"	Justė, Jaxstyle and Jon	January 1	"Za kogo mnie masz?"	Sobel	January 10	"Za kogo mnie masz?"	Sobel	
January 9	"Turn the Lights Off"	Justė, Jaxstyle and Jon	January 8	"Za kogo mnie masz?"	Sobel	January 17	"Za kogo mnie masz?"	Sobel	
January 16	"Turn the Lights Off"	Justė, Jaxstyle and Jon	January 15	"After"	Tax Free, Malik Montana and Kazior	January 24	"After"	Tax Free, Malik Montana and Kazior	
January 23	"Turn the Lights Off"	Justė, Jaxstyle and Jon	January 22	"After"	Tax Free, Malik Montana and Kazior	January 31	"After"	Tax Free, Malik Montana and Kazior	
January 30	"Turn the Lights Off"	Justė, Jaxstyle and Jon	January 29	"After"	Tax Free, Malik Montana and Kazior	February 7	"After"	Tax Free, Malik Montana and Kazior	
February 6	"Turn the Lights Off"	Justė, Jaxstyle and Jon	February 5	"Temacik"	Ekipa, Friz, Wersow and Kostek	February 14	"Jet ski"	Ekipa, Kostek, Julita Różalska and Wujek Łuki	
February 13	"Obejmuję noce"	Jonatan, Pezet and Livka	February 12	"O jak miło"	Ekipa, Wujek Łuki, Wiktoria Niekało, Michu Kontrabas, $okolica and KuzynMichu	February 21	"After"	Tax Free, Malik Montana and Kazior	
February 20	"Obejmuję noce"	Jonatan, Pezet and Livka	February 19	"Frisbee"	Sentino and BNP	February 28	"Frisbee"	Sentino and BNP	
February 27	"Obejmuję noce"	Jonatan, Pezet and Livka	February 26	"Frisbee"	Sentino and BNP	March 7	"Frisbee"	Sentino and BNP	
March 6	"Komu miałabym powiedzieć?"	Bletka	March 5	"O jak miło"	Ekipa, Wujek Łuki, Wiktoria Niekało, Michu Kontrabas, $okolica and KuzynMichu	March 14	"Frisbee"	Sentino and BNP	
March 13	"Komu miałabym powiedzieć?"	Bletka	March 12	"Arigato"	Ekipa, Hi Hania, Mortal, Świeży, Fusialka, Julita Różalska and Ola Bryja	March 21	"Arigato"	Ekipa, Hi Hania, Mortal, Świeży, Fusialka, Julita Różalska and Ola Bryja	
March 20	"Galaxy"	Kungs and Theophilus London	March 19	"Ostatni raz"	Sentino and BNP featuring Kaz Bałagane	March 28	"Ostatni raz"	Sentino and BNP featuring Kaz Bałagane	
March 27	"Galaxy"	Kungs and Theophilus London	March 26	"Fantazje"	Miü featuring Pezet and Bedoes	April 4	"Fantazje"	Miü featuring Pezet and Bedoes	
April 3	"Galaxy"	Kungs and Theophilus London	April 2	"Fantazje"	Miü featuring Pezet and Bedoes	April 11	"Fantazje"	Miü featuring Pezet and Bedoes	
April 10	"Galaxy"	Kungs and Theophilus London	April 9	"Fantazje"	Miü featuring Pezet and Bedoes	April 18	"Fantazje"	Miü featuring Pezet and Bedoes	
April 17	"Galaxy"	Kungs and Theophilus London	April 16	"Fantazje"	Miü featuring Pezet and Bedoes	April 25	"Fantazje"	Miü featuring Pezet and Bedoes	
April 24	"Galaxy"	Kungs and Theophilus London	April 23	"Fantazje"	Miü featuring Pezet and Bedoes	May 2	"Fantazje"	Miü featuring Pezet and Bedoes	
May 1	"Galaxy"	Kungs and Theophilus London	April 30	"Fantazje"	Miü featuring Pezet and Bedoes	May 9	"Ciągle tutaj jestem (diss na raka)"	Bedoes and Maja Mecan	
May 8	"New Religion"	Bebe Rexha and Faithless	May 7	"Fantazje"	Miü featuring Pezet and Bedoes	May 16	"Fantazje"	Miü featuring Pezet and Bedoes	
May 15	"New Religion"	Bebe Rexha and Faithless	May 14	"Nareszcie"	Męskie Granie Orkiestra 2026	May 23	"Saudi"	Tax Free, Malik Montana and Kazior featuring Tyk	
May 22	"New Religion"	Bebe Rexha and Faithless	May 21	"Nareszcie"	Męskie Granie Orkiestra 2026	May 30	"Nareszcie"	Męskie Granie Orkiestra 2026	
May 29	"New Religion"	Bebe Rexha and Faithless	May 28	"Nareszcie"	Męskie Granie Orkiestra 2026	June 6	"Nareszcie"	Męskie Granie Orkiestra 2026	
June 5	"New Religion"	Bebe Rexha and Faithless	June 4	"Nareszcie"	Męskie Granie Orkiestra 2026	June 13	"Nareszcie"	Męskie Granie Orkiestra 2026	
June 12	"Nareszcie"	Męskie Granie Orkiestra 2026	June 11	"Nareszcie"	Męskie Granie Orkiestra 2026	June 20	"Nareszcie"	Męskie Granie Orkiestra 2026	
June 19	"Nareszcie"	Męskie Granie Orkiestra 2026	June 18	"Nareszcie"	Męskie Granie Orkiestra 2026	June 27	"Nareszcie"	Męskie Granie Orkiestra 2026	
June 26	"Nareszcie"	Męskie Granie Orkiestra 2026	June 25	"California Love"	White 2115, VVSimon and Palar	July 4	"Nareszcie"	Męskie Granie Orkiestra 2026	
July 3	"Nareszcie"	Męskie Granie Orkiestra 2026	July 2	"California Love"	White 2115, VVSimon and Palar	July 11	"Nareszcie"	Męskie Granie Orkiestra 2026	
July 10	"Nareszcie"	Męskie Granie Orkiestra 2026	July 9	"Nareszcie"	Męskie Granie Orkiestra 2026	July 18	"Red Bull 64 Bars"	Avi and Favst	
July 17	"Nareszcie"	Męskie Granie Orkiestra 2026	July 16	"Nareszcie"	Męskie Granie Orkiestra 2026	July 25	"Red Bull 64 Bars"	Avi and Favst	
July 24	"Nareszcie"	Męskie Granie Orkiestra 2026	July 23	"Nareszcie"	Męskie Granie Orkiestra 2026	August 1	"Nareszcie"	Męskie Granie Orkiestra 2026	
July 31	"Nareszcie"	Męskie Granie Orkiestra 2026	July 30	"Nareszcie"	Męskie Granie Orkiestra 2026	August 8	"Red Flag"	White 2115	
August 7	"Nareszcie"	Męskie Granie Orkiestra 2026	August 6	"Nareszcie"	Męskie Granie Orkiestra 2026	August 15	"Abi Mosa"	Malik Montana	
August 14	"Nareszcie"	Męskie Granie Orkiestra 2026	August 13	"Koszt bycia Boss"	Kubi Producent featuring Sapi Tha King, Kuqe 2115, Bedoes and Szpaku	August 22	"Koszt bycia Boss"	Kubi Producent featuring Sapi Tha King, Kuqe 2115, Bedoes and Szpaku	
August 21	"Na błysk"	Dawid Podsiadło	August 20	"Dai Dai"	Shakira and Burna Boy	August 29	"Więcej nieba"	Otsochodzi featuring Oki	
August 28	"Self Aware"	Temper City	August 27	"Deli Supreme"	MJ Deli	September 5	"Deli Supreme"	MJ Deli	
September 4	"Self Aware"	Temper City	September 3	"Deli Supreme"	MJ Deli	September 12	"Deli Supreme"	MJ Deli	
September 11	"Self Aware"	Temper City	September 10	"Deli Supreme"	MJ Deli	September 19	"Deli Supreme"	MJ Deli	
September 18	"Tylko kochaj mnie"	Zalia	September 17	"Deli Supreme"	MJ Deli	September 26	"RMB (Ring My Bell) – Polish Remix"	Aitch and Mata	
September 25	"Ostatni dzień lata"	Gibbs featuring Igo	September 24	"Nienawidzę Warszawy"	Otsochodzi	October 3	"Nienawidzę Warszawy"	Otsochodzi	
October 2	"Tylko kochaj mnie"	Zalia	October 1	"Nienawidzę Warszawy"	Otsochodzi	October 10	"Nienawidzę Warszawy"	Otsochodzi	
October 9	"Tylko kochaj mnie"	Zalia	October 8	"Nienawidzę Warszawy"	Otsochodzi	October 17	"Nienawidzę Warszawy"	Otsochodzi	
October 16	"Tylko kochaj mnie"	Zalia	October 15	"Mami"	730 Huncho featuring Malik Montana	October 24	"Mami"	730 Huncho featuring Malik Montana	
October 23	"Bez końca"	Oskar Cyms	October 22	"Mami"	730 Huncho featuring Malik Montana	October 31	"Mami"	730 Huncho featuring Malik Montana	
October 30	"What If?"	Neptunica	October 29	"Mami"	730 Huncho featuring Malik Montana	November 7	"Mami"	730 Huncho featuring Malik Montana	
November 6	"Chłopaki"	Kuba i Kuba	November 5	"Mami"	730 Huncho featuring Malik Montana	November 14	"Mami"	730 Huncho featuring Malik Montana	
November 13	"Chłopaki"	Kuba i Kuba	November 12	"Blackberry"	Hellfield and Sentino	November 21	"Mami"	730 Huncho featuring Malik Montana	

== Number-one artists ==
=== OLiA ===
List of number-one artists by total weeks at number one
Artist	Weeks at No. 1
Męskie Granie Orkiestra 2026	10
Kungs	7
Theophilus London	7
Justė	6
Jaxstyle	6
Jon	6
Bebe Rexha	5
Faithless	5
Zalia	4
Jonatan	3
Pezet	3
Livka	3
Temper City	3
Bletka	2
Kuba i Kuba	2
Dawid Podsiadło	1
Gibbs	1
Igo	1
Oskar Cyms	1
Neptunica	1

=== OLiS – streaming chart ===
List of number-one artists by total weeks at number one
Artist	Weeks at No. 1
Męskie Granie Orkiestra 2026	11
Bedoes	8
Miü	7
Pezet	7
Malik Montana	7
Ekipa	4
MJ Deli	4
730 Huncho	4
Sentino	4
Tax Free	3
Kazior	3
BNP	3
Otsochodzi	3
Sobel	2
Wujek Łuki	2
Wiktoria Niekało	2
Michu Kontrabas	2
$okolica	2
KuzynMichu	2
White 2115	2
VVSimon	2
Palar	2
Friz	1
Wersow	1
Kostek	1
Hi Hania	1
Mortal	1
Świeży	1
Fusialka	1
Julita Różalska	1
Ola Bryja	1
Kaz Bałagane	1
Kubi Producent	1
Sapi Tha King	1
Kuqe 2115	1
Szpaku	1
Shakira	1
Burna Boy	1
Hellfield	1

=== Billboard Poland Songs ===
List of number-one artists by total weeks at number one
Artist	Weeks at No. 1
Malik Montana	11
Męskie Granie Orkiestra 2026	8
Bedoes	8
Miü	6
Pezet	6
Tax Free	5
Kazior	5
730 Huncho	5
Sentino	4
BNP	4
Otsochodzi	4
MJ Deli	3
Sobel	2
Ekipa	2
Julita Różalska	2
Avi	2
Favst	2
Wham!	1
Kostek	1
Wujek Łuki	1
Hi Hania	1
Mortal	1
Świeży	1
Fusialka	1
Ola Bryja	1
Kaz Bałagane	1
Maja Mecan	1
Tyk	1
White 2115	1
Kubi Producent	1
Sapi Tha King	1
Kuqe 2115	1
Szpaku	1
Oki	1
Aitch	1
Mata	1

== See also ==
- Polish music charts
- List of number-one albums of 2026 (Poland)
