= Jak nie my to kto =

2013 single by Mrozu

Single by Mrozu featuring Tomson

from the album Rollercoaster
- Released: 18 December 2013
- Recorded: 2013
- Genre: Blues, rock and roll
- Length: 3:42
- Songwriters: Jacek Maciej Graniecki, Michael Kozuchowski

Mrozu singles chronology
"1000 m nad ziemią" (2012)	"Jak nie my to kto" (2013)	"Nic do stracenia" (2014)

Music video
- "Jak nie my to kto" on YouTube

"Jak nie my to kto" (Polish: [ˈjak ˈɲɛ ˈmɘ̟ ˈtɔ ˈktɔ]; lit. 'If Not Us, Then Whom') is a Polish-language single recorded by Mrozu and featuring Tomson. The song mostly features elements of blues and rock and roll, with inspirations from the 1960s music. It was released on the YouTube platform on 18 December 2013, and was later included on the platinum-certified album Rollercoaster, which was released on 11 March 2014.

The recording was directed by Mrozu and Robert "DrySkull" Krawczyk, with the artistic supervision of Marcin Bors. It additionally featured the chorus by Patrycja Gola.

It reached high placements on various record charts in Poland, including a first place on the RMF FM's Poplista. By July 2021, the song's music video had almost 15.8 million views.

== In popular culture ==
The song was used in 2019 films Robbery and Miszmasz, czyli kogel-mogel 3.

== Chart performance ==
=== Weekly and daily charts ===
Chart (2019)	Peak position
Poland (AirPlay – Top)	13
Poland (AirPlay – Nowości)	2
Poland (Poplista)	1
Poland (SLiP)	9

== Personnel ==
- vocals: Mrozu, Tomson
- chorus: Patrycja Gola
- Direction: Mrozu, Robert "DrySkull" Krawczyk
- Artistic supervision: Marcin Bors
