= Daria Zawiałow =

Polish singer-songwriter (born 1992)

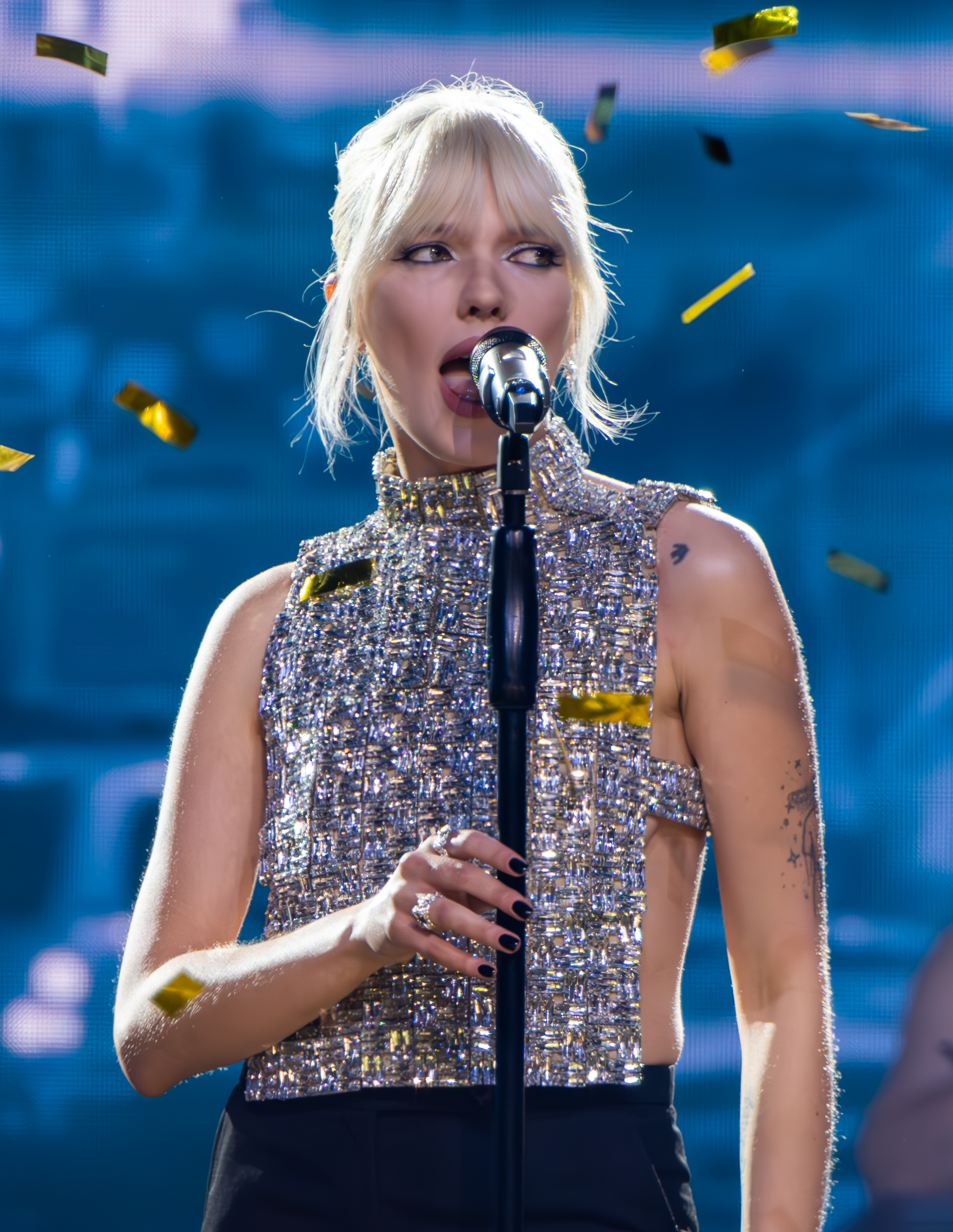
- Zawiałow in 2024
- Born: Daria Barbara Zawiałow; August 18, 1992 (age 34); Koszalin, Poland
- Other name: Daria Kaczmarek
- Occupations: singer-songwriter, composer
- Years active: 2007–present
- Spouse: Tomasz Kaczmarek (m. 2016; div. 2022)
- Musical career
- Genres: indie pop, rock, pop-rock
- Instrument: guitar
- Labels: Sony Music, Kayax

Daria Barbara Zawiałow (pronounced: [zaˈvjawɔf]; born August 18, 1992) is a Polish singer-songwriter, composer, and a music journalist. She won the "Debuts" competition at the National Festival of Polish Song in Opole in 2009. She received 7 Fryderyk Awards conferred by the Polish Society of the Phonographic Industry. In 2021, she was awarded the Best Polish Act at the 2021 MTV Europe Music Awards.

== Career ==
=== Early life and career ===
She was born on 18 August 1992 in Koszalin in the north of Poland where she grew up. In 2007, she won the Tukan Junior Award at the Children's Competition of Dramatic Interpretation of Song in Wrocław. In 2008, she moved to Warsaw in order to attend a music high school. She graduated from the John III Sobieski High School No. 75. in Warsaw. In 2009, she won the Szansa na Sukces music talent show broadcast on TVP2 channel. This enabled her to take part in the "Debuts" competition at the 46th edition of the National Festival of Polish Song in Opole where she performed Kasia Nosowska's song "Era retuszera" and ultimately won the 1st Prize. She subsequently won an audition for a backing vocalist for Maryla Rodowicz. She performed at Rodowicz concerts for the next two years. In 2011, Zawiałow took part in the Mam talent show, the Polish version of the Got Talent series, where she reached the semifinal.

In 2012, she released two singles under the alias D.A.R.I.A titled "Half Way to Heaven" and "Dwa światy" from her unpublished album Half Way to Heaven. In 2014, she was the winner of the Pejzaż bez Ciebie music contest. In 2016, she won the Review of Film Songs and Ballads competition in Toruń. In the same year, she returned to the National Festival of Polish Song in Opole where she performed her song "Malinowy chruśniak". She received the Anna Jantar Award as well as the Polish Radio Award at the festival.

=== 2017-present: Musical debut ===
Zawiałow released six pre-release singles in preparation for the release of her debut album, "A Kysz" (stylised as "A Kysz!)", "Malinowy Chrusniak", "Lwy", "Kundel Bury", "Chameleon", "Miłostki", and "Na Skróty." The album was released on 3 March 2017. She wrote the lyrics to all of the songs featured on the album and was also the co-composer to all of the songs. On 3 June, she performed at the Orange Warsaw Festival.

Her second album, "Helsinki" was released on 8 March 2019 and is her most commercially successful album as of October 2023. In June 2019, Zawiałow released a single "Czy Ty słyszysz mnie?" with guest appearances from Schafter and Ralph Kaminski as part of the Talent Is Not A Crime project. In 2020, she made a guest appearance in rapper Quebonafide's single entitled "Bubbletea". On 8 April 2021, she released a single featuring Dawid Podsiadło entitled "Za krótki sen", which received a double platinum certification. Her third album, "Wojny i noce" was released on 11 June 2021 and features a Japanese-inspired production. In the same year, she collaborated with Dawid Podsiadło and Vito Bambino and established together with them the 2021 Męskie Granie Orchestra releasing the single "I Ciebie też" promoting the 2021 Męskie Granie Tour.

On 20 March 2022, she participated in the Together with Ukraine charity concert organized at the Atlas Arena in Łódź, whose aim was to raise funds for the Ukrainian war refugees fleeing the country amid the ongoing Russian invasion of Ukraine. At the concert, she paired with Polish singer Igo and performed an interpretation of BAJM's 1982 song "Co mi Panie dasz". The concert featured many Polish and Ukrainian artists including Kayah, Tina Karol, Jerry Heil, Andrzej Seweryn, Stanisław Sojka and Krzysztof Zalewski. Her fourth album, "Dziewczyna Pop" was released on 20 October 2023 and features a pop-rock production. "A Kysz", "Helsinki", and "Wojny i noce" have been certified platinum, and "Dziewczyna Pop" has been certified gold by the Polish Society of the Phonographic Industry. Her single "Złamane serce jest ok" from the album, reached the number 1 position on the official Polish single charts.

In 2024, she participated in the annual Męskie Granie concert tour. The 15th edition of the event was promoted by a single Wolne duchy alongside a music video, which she recorded with Mrozu and the Kacperczyk Brothers.

== Personal life ==
Zawiałow's great-grandfather on her father's side hailed from Russia, which is the reason behind her Russian surname. Her great-grandmother on her mother's side was Polish of Czech descent and lived in Warsaw.

On 21 May 2016, she married guitarist Tomasz Kaczmarek (born 1983), known for his performances in Cała Gora Barwinków, who currently plays in the singer's band. The couple met while participating in the fourth edition of the X Factor program. After the wedding she adopted her husband's surname, but continued to pursue her artistic career under her maiden name. In June 2022, after initially denying claims that she and Tomasz had separated, Daria eventually confirmed that they were no longer together. In July 2022, it was reported that she had entered a relationship with guitarist and singer-songwriter Piotr "Rubens" Rubik.

== Discography ==
=== Studio albums ===
Year	Album details	Peak chart positions		Certificates	Sales
Year	Album details	POL	POL (vinyl)	Certificates	Sales
2017	A kysz!: Released: 3 March 2017; Label: Sony Music; Format: CD, LP, digital download	7	–	POL: Platinum	POL: 30 000+
2019	Helsinki: Released: 8 March 2019; Label: Sony Music; Format: CD, LP, digital download	1	1	POL: 2× Platinum	POL: 60 000+
2021	Wojny i noce: Released: 11 June 2021; Label: Sony Music; Format: CD, LP, digital download	2	1	POL: Platinum	POL: 30 000+
2023	Dziewczyna Pop: Released: 20 October 2023; Label: Sony Music; Format: CD, LP, digital download	2	3	POL: Gold	POL: 15 000+
"–" means that the album was not listed on the given chart.

== Awards and nominations ==
Award Ceremony	Year	Work	Category	Result
Berlin Music Video Awards	2023	Laura	Best Narrative	Nominated
