= List of number-one albums of 2026 (Poland) =

This is a list of number-one albums of 2026 in Poland, per the OLiS chart.

== Chart history ==
Issue date	Albums		Physical albums		Streaming albums		Ref.
Issue date	Album	Artist(s)	Album	Artist(s)	Album	Artist(s)	Ref.
January 1	Latarnie wszędzie dawno zgasły	Taco Hemingway	Szukamy guza	Luxtorpeda	Latarnie wszędzie dawno zgasły	Taco Hemingway	
January 8	Latarnie wszędzie dawno zgasły	Taco Hemingway	Friend7	Friendz	Latarnie wszędzie dawno zgasły	Taco Hemingway	
January 15	Latarnie wszędzie dawno zgasły	Taco Hemingway	Friend7	Friendz	Latarnie wszędzie dawno zgasły	Taco Hemingway	
January 22	Latarnie wszędzie dawno zgasły	Taco Hemingway	Friend7	Friendz	Latarnie wszędzie dawno zgasły	Taco Hemingway	
January 29	WPR	Avi	WPR	Avi	Latarnie wszędzie dawno zgasły	Taco Hemingway	
February 5	Megadeth	Megadeth	Megadeth	Megadeth	Latarnie wszędzie dawno zgasły	Taco Hemingway	
February 12	Latarnie wszędzie dawno zgasły	Taco Hemingway	Stranger Things: Soundtrack from the Netflix Series, Season 5	Various artists	Latarnie wszędzie dawno zgasły	Taco Hemingway	
February 19	Debí Tirar Más Fotos	Bad Bunny	Przesilenie	Kwiat Jabłoni	Latarnie wszędzie dawno zgasły	Taco Hemingway	
February 26	Wolny wybieg	Dezerter	Wolny wybieg	Dezerter	Latarnie wszędzie dawno zgasły	Taco Hemingway	
March 5	Full H.D.	Spięty	Full H.D.	Spięty	Latarnie wszędzie dawno zgasły	Taco Hemingway	
March 12	Sobie potrzebni	Dżem	Sobie potrzebni	Dżem	Latarnie wszędzie dawno zgasły	Taco Hemingway	
March 19	Latarnie wszędzie dawno zgasły	Taco Hemingway	Latarnie wszędzie dawno zgasły	Taco Hemingway	Kiss All the Time. Disco, Occasionally	Harry Styles	
March 26	Kult Tenerife 29.11.2024	Kult	Kult Tenerife 29.11.2024	Kult	Zabójstwo liryczne 5	Sentino and BNP	
April 2	Zrobiłem to dla siebie	Gibbs	Zrobiłem to dla siebie	Gibbs	Ü Up? mixtape	Miü	
April 9	Dwadzieściasiedem	Chivas	Dwadzieściasiedem	Chivas	Ü Up? mixtape	Miü	
April 16	Arirang	BTS	Przesilenie	Kwiat Jabłoni	Nie dla wszystkich	Majki and Major SPZ	
April 23	Eternia	Eldo	Eternia	Eldo	California Love EP	White 2115	
April 30	JWP Krew	JWP/BC	JWP Krew	JWP/BC	California Love EP	White 2115	
May 7	California Love EP	White 2115	California Love EP	White 2115	Nie dla wszystkich	Majki and Major SPZ	
May 14	Hit Me Hard and Soft: The Tour (Live)	Billie Eilish	Hit Me Hard and Soft: The Tour (Live)	Billie Eilish	Nie dla wszystkich	Majki and Major SPZ	
May 21	Latarnie wszędzie dawno zgasły	Taco Hemingway	Latarnie wszędzie dawno zgasły	Taco Hemingway	Nie dla wszystkich	Majki and Major SPZ	
May 28	Stromo	Donguralesko	Stromo	Donguralesko	Nie dla wszystkich	Majki and Major SPZ	
June 4	Multiverse	Ekipa	Multiverse	Ekipa	Nie dla wszystkich	Majki and Major SPZ	
June 11	Nurt	Gibbs	Nurt	Gibbs	Nie dla wszystkich	Majki and Major SPZ	
June 18	PCC 3.0	Paluch and Chris Carson	PCC 3.0	Paluch and Chris Carson	Nie dla wszystkich	Majki and Major SPZ	
June 25	Reklamacja'47	Oki	Reklamacja'47	Oki	You Seem Pretty Sad for a Girl So in Love	Olivia Rodrigo	
July 2	Xxende Mylffon	Tede	Xxende Mylffon	Tede	Nie dla wszystkich	Majki and Major SPZ	
July 9	Nie dla wszystkich	Majki and Major SPZ	Podróże z i pod prąd	Happysad	Nie dla wszystkich	Majki and Major SPZ	
July 16	Sie porobiło...	Hubert.	Splat!	Deep Purple	Nie dla wszystkich	Majki and Major SPZ	
July 23	Foreign Tongues	The Rolling Stones	Kult Tenerife 29.11.2024	Kult	Nie dla wszystkich	Majki and Major SPZ	
July 30	Nie dla wszystkich	Majki and Major SPZ	Coraz mocniej 3ma EP	CielOG	Nie dla wszystkich	Majki and Major SPZ	
August 6	Nie dla wszystkich	Majki and Major SPZ	Music, Fashion, Film	Charli XCX	Nie dla wszystkich	Majki and Major SPZ	
August 13	Petal	Ariana Grande	Petal	Ariana Grande	Petal	Ariana Grande	
August 20	This & That	Stray Kids	This & That	Stray Kids	Jezu Chryste Kubi	Kubi Producent	
August 27	OPA7	Opał	OPA7	Opał	Nie dla wszystkich	Majki and Major SPZ	
September 3	Nie dla wszystkich	Majki and Major SPZ	Petal	Ariana Grande	Nie dla wszystkich	Majki and Major SPZ	
September 10	Nie dla wszystkich	Majki and Major SPZ	This & That	Stray Kids	Nie dla wszystkich	Majki and Major SPZ	
September 17	I, Scvlptor	Behemoth	I, Scvlptor	Behemoth	Nie dla wszystkich	Majki and Major SPZ	
September 24	Nie dla wszystkich	Majki and Major SPZ	This & That	Stray Kids	Nie dla wszystkich	Majki and Major SPZ	
October 1	RioTT	Otsochodzi	RioTT	Otsochodzi	RioTT	Otsochodzi	
October 8	RioTT	Otsochodzi	Kraków, Marzec 2020	Kukon	RioTT	Otsochodzi	
October 15	Południe	Dawid Kwiatkowski	Południe	Dawid Kwiatkowski	RioTT	Otsochodzi	
October 22	96	Skolim	96	Skolim	RioTT	Otsochodzi	
October 29	B	Bambi	B	Bambi	RioTT	Otsochodzi	
November 5	RioTT	Otsochodzi	Illusion 9	Illusion	RioTT	Otsochodzi	
November 12	RioTT	Otsochodzi	Sanah na stadionach Live, część 2	Sanah	RioTT	Otsochodzi	
November 19	RioTT	Otsochodzi	Requiem for a Village	Steven Wilson	RioTT	Otsochodzi	

== See also ==
- List of number-one singles of 2026 (Poland)
