= Ralph Kaminski =

Polish singer-songwriter

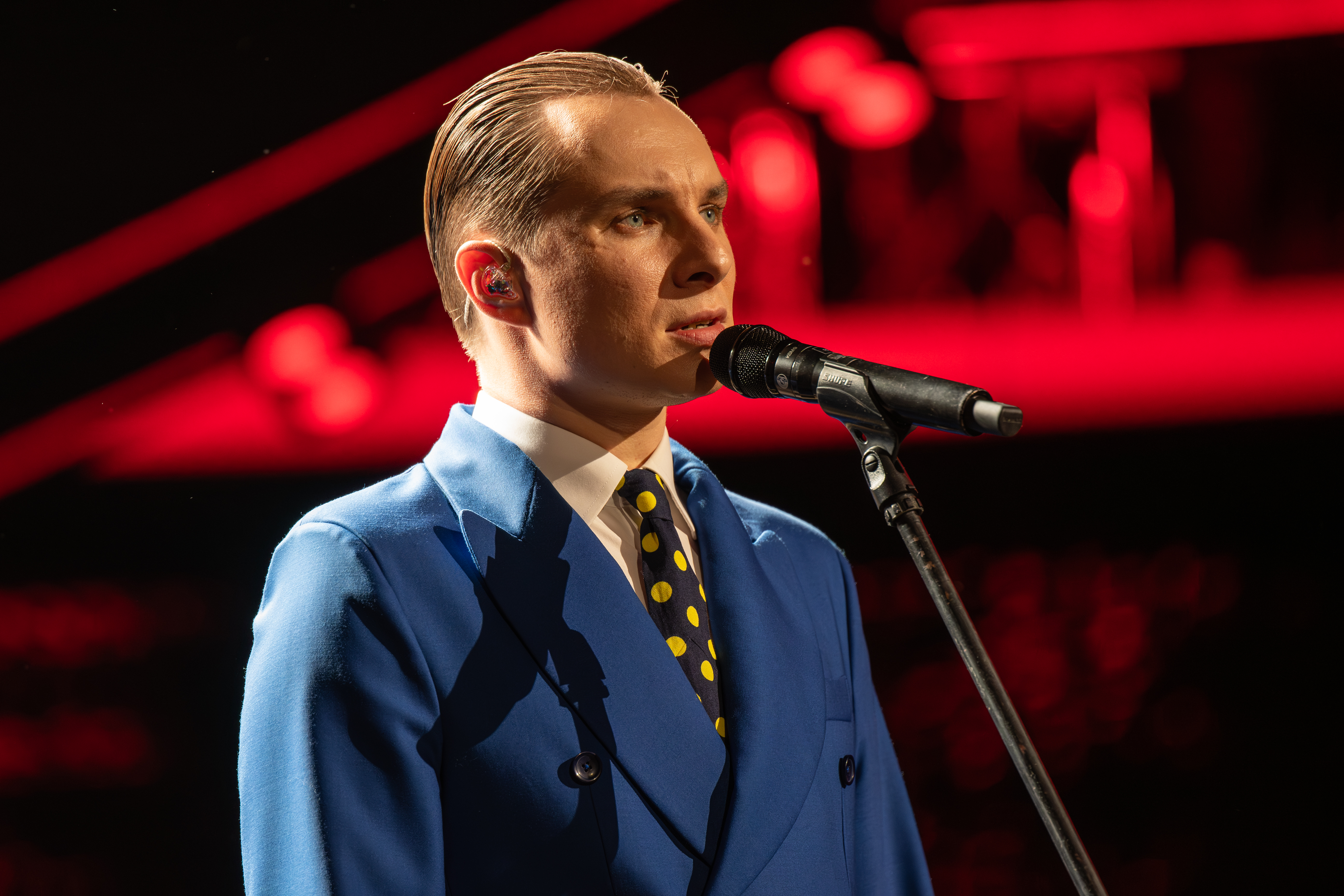
- Kaminski in 2025
- Born: Rafał Stanisław Kamiński; November 8, 1990 (age 35); Jasło, Poland
- Education: Stanisław Moniuszko Academy of Music in Gdańsk, Codarts University for the Arts
- Occupations: Singer-songwriter; record producer
- Years active: 2010–present
- Musical career
- Genres: Alternative pop; electronic music; chamber music
- Instruments: Vocals; piano; violin; Hammond organ
- Label: Fonobo
- Website: ralphkaminski.com

Rafał Stanisław Kamiński (Polish pronunciation: [ˈrafaw kaˈmiɲskʲi]; born 8 November 1990), known professionally as Ralph Kaminski, is a Polish singer-songwriter, record producer and multi-instrumentalist. His works are often characterized by experimentation with musical styles, including alternative pop and chamber music. He received two Fryderyk Awards at the 2022 Fryderyk Awards Gala as well as Best Polish Act at the 2022 MTV Europe Music Awards.

== Early life ==
He was born and raised in Jasło in southern Poland. His mother is a teacher. He has a younger brother, Wiktor. His cousin is a fellow singer Michał Szpak, Kaminski himself confirmed this on the Kuba Wojewódzki talk show.

He developed an interest in music as a child. At the age of 11, Kaminski started attending vocal classes at the Jasło Cultural Centre. He studied art and music before embarking on a professional career as a musician in 2010. Kaminski graduated from the Jazz and Popular Music Department at the Stanisław Moniuszko Academy of Music in Gdańsk. He also studied at the Pop Department of Codarts University for the Arts in Rotterdam. In 2010, he composed his first song entitled "The Hill". In 2011, he performed the song at the International Carpathia Festival and won the Grand Prix. In 2012, he released his first single "Don't Know Why" and one year later started performing with his band consisting of seven members called My Best Band in the World.

== Career ==
=== Talent shows ===
In 2009, he appeared in one of the episodes of TVP2 programme Szansa na Sukces, performing a song by Perfect "Objazdowe nieme kino". In 2012 he took part in the second edition of the TVN talent show X Factor; he performed Norah Jones' song "Don't Know Why" during the auditions. He was eliminated at the bootcamp stage.

=== Breakthrough ===
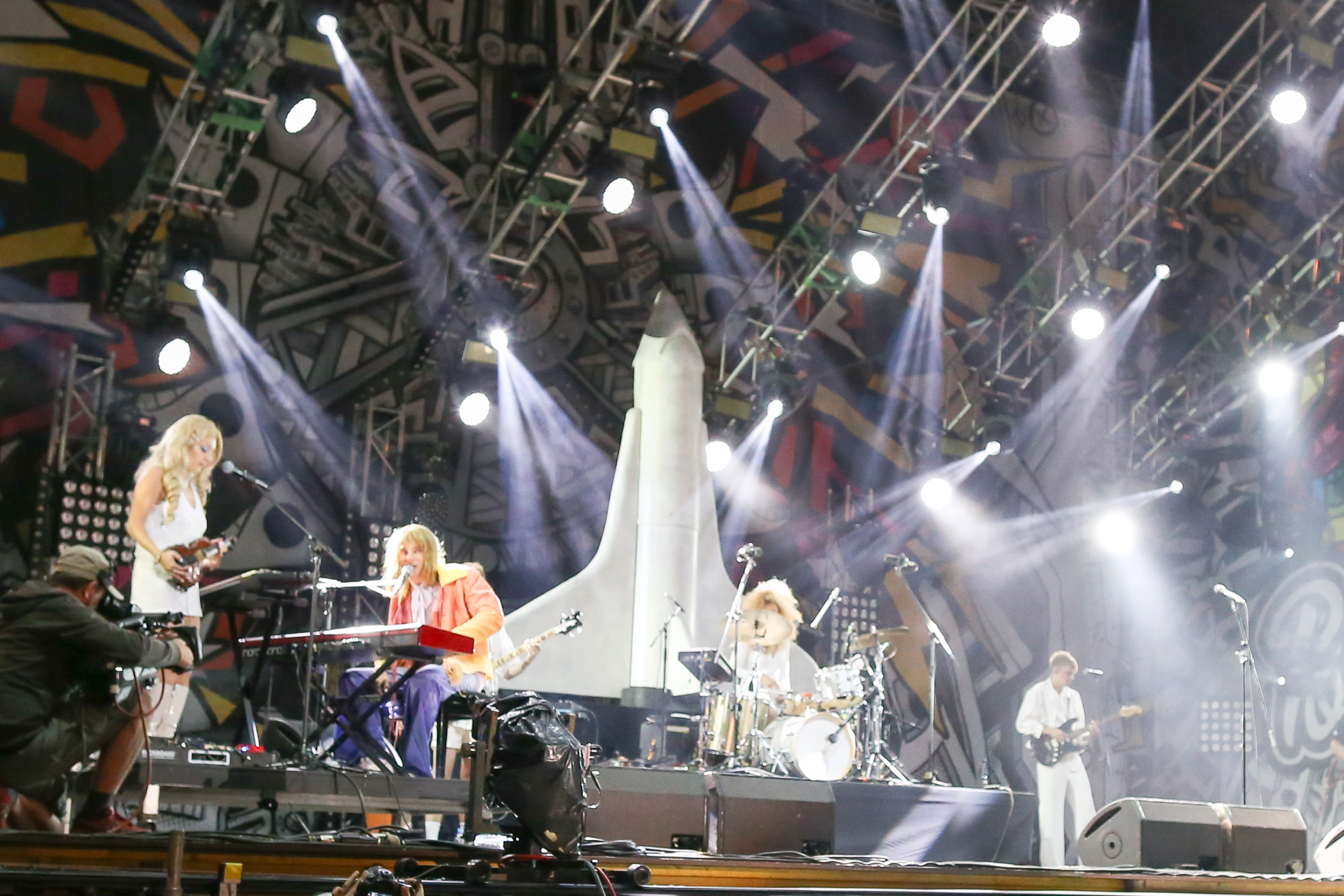
Kaminski performing with his band at the Pol'and'Rock Festival in 2019

On 6 June 2016, he performed at the "Alternative Stage" concert during the 53rd National Festival of Polish Songs in Opole. On 14 November, he released his debut studio album entitled "Morze". The album was promoted with the singles: "Podobno", "Zawsze", and "Meybick Song". In 2017, he performed at the Open'er Festival, and in June 2018, he performed at the Orange Warsaw Festival.

In 2019, he won the final of the 40th Actor Song Review (Polish: Przegląd Piosenki Aktorskiej) in Wrocław, thanks to his "Welcome To Our Fairytale" performance from the musical based on Academy of Mr. Kleks, and "On the Corner" written by Agnieszka Osiecka. In August that year, he performed at the Pol'and'Rock Festival. On 22 November, he released his second studio album entitled "Młodość" (Youth), which reached number 17 on the official sales list in Poland. The album is seen as a nostalgic journey to the 1980s music and contains autobiographical and queer elements. He also participated in the Talent Is Not A Crime project recording a song "Czy ty słyszysz mnie?" (Can You Hear Me?) with Daria Zawiałow, Michał Kush and Schafter.

In 2020, he became a recipient of the Grzegorz Ciechowski Artistic Award of the City of Toruń.

In 2021, he released his third solo album entitled Kora, which is a tribute to Olga Jackowska, the lead vocalist of Maanam rock band and an icon of Polish New wave music who died in 2018. The same year he won the Paszport Polityki conferred by the Polityka weekly news magazine in the Popular Music category.

In 2022, he received two Fryderyk Awards for his 2021 album Kora. He won in the Artist of the Year and Sung poetry categories. The same year, he also won Best Polish Act at the 2022 MTV Europe Music Awards.

== Private life ==
In the spring of 2017, he fell ill with depression. He talked about the illness and two years of psychotherapy in the song "D Club" from his album Młodość. He is a vegetarian.

He mentioned ABBA, Amy Winehouse, Culture Club, David Bowie, George Michael, Tom Odell, Diana Ross and MGMT among the artists whose music he values the most. He also named Abel Korzeniowski and Zbigniew Preisner among his favourite film score composers.

== Discography ==
- Morze (2016), ZPAV: Gold
- Młodość (2019), ZPAV: Gold
- Kora (2021), ZPAV: Gold
- Bal u Rafała (2022), ZPAV: Gold

== See also ==
- Music of Poland
- List of Polish music artists
