= The Dumplings (duo) =

Polish electropop music duo

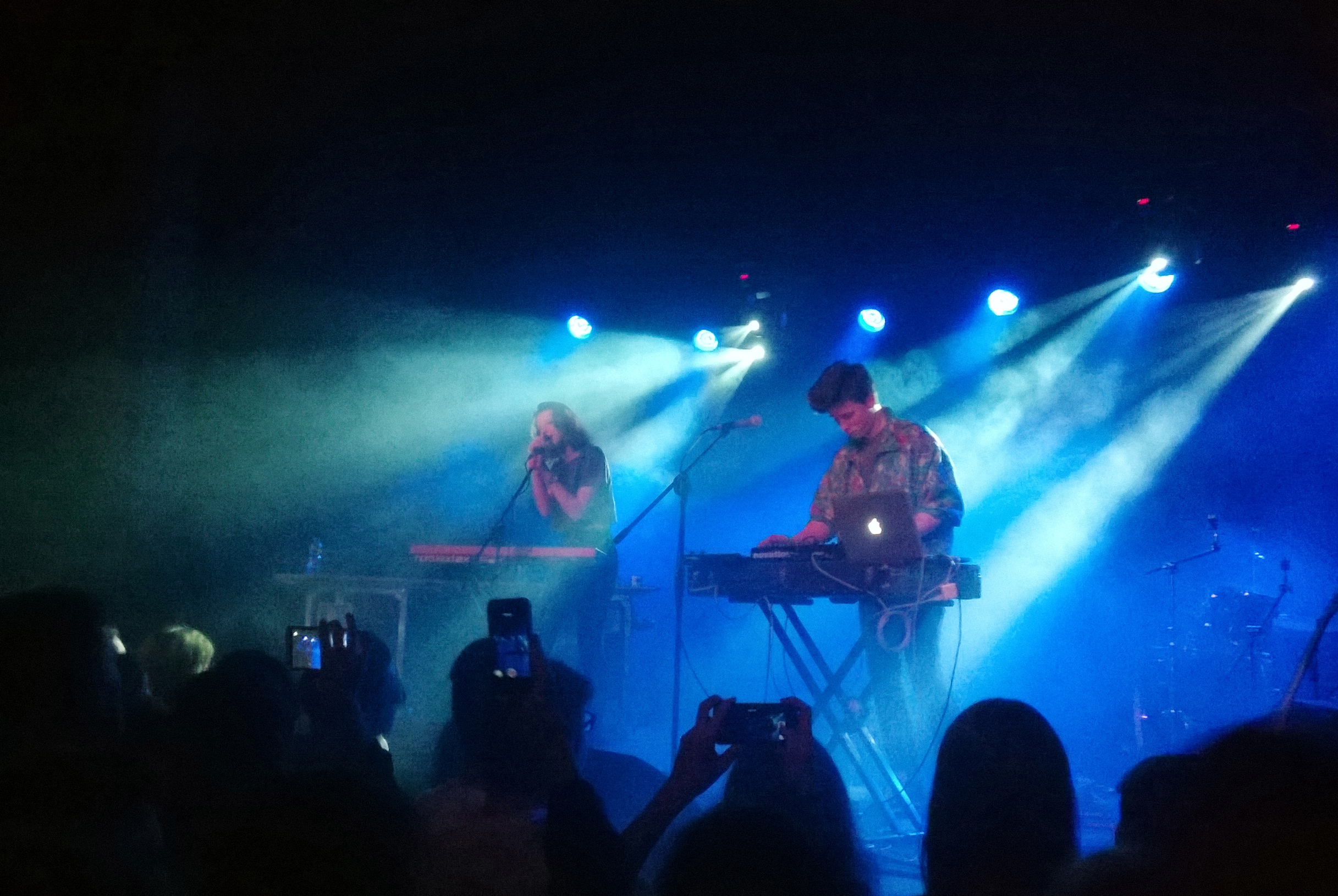
- The Dumplings performing in Kraków, 2015

Background information
- Origin: Zabrze, Poland
- Genres: Electropop
- Years active: 2011–present
- Labels: Warner Music Poland
- Members: Justyna Święs; Kuba Karaś

The Dumplings are a Polish electropop duo from Zabrze, consisting of Justyna Święs and Kuba Karaś. As of 2016, they have released two studio albums. Their debut studio album No Bad Days was released in May 2014 through Warner Music. It has been hailed one of the greatest musical sensations of 2014 by the Polish media, receiving an exclusive Fryderyk award for phonographic debut of the year.

== History ==
Justyna Święs and Kuba Karaś first met in 2011 at a song competition and decided to start playing together. Initially, they were playing indie rock acoustic songs, but then decided to go in a more electronic direction. During the Summer 2013, they composed several songs and mailed them to Łukasz Jakóbiak who has a popular Internet talk-show 20m2 Łukasza. The band became an Internet phenomenon, and in November 2013 they began their first sold-out tour, playing concerts in clubs in Poland.

In January 2014, they entered a studio owned by music producer Bartosz Szczęsny and recorded songs for their debut album. The Dumplings were signed to Warner Music Poland in February 2014. Their debut studio album No Bad Days, produced by Szczęsny, was released on 13 May 2014 through Warner Music. They performed at Open'er Festival in July, and at Off Festival in August 2014.

Their second studio album Sea You Later, produced by popular Polish drummer and hip-hop producer Piotr "Emade" Waglewski, was released on 13 November 2015. A concert tour to promote the album started on 6 November in Opole and will end on 6 December in London.

== Discography ==
=== Studio albums ===
Title	Album details	Peak chart positions
Title	Album details	POL
No Bad Days	Released: 13 May 2014; Label: Warner Music Poland; Format: CD, digital download	28
Sea You Later	Released: 13 November 2015; Label: Warner Music Poland; Format: CD, digital download	8
Raj	Released: 21 September 2018; Label: Warner Music Poland; Format: CD, digital download	4

=== Extended plays ===
Title	Album details
Technicolor Yawn (Remixes)	Released: 1 July 2014; Label: Warner Music Poland

=== Singles ===
Title	Year	Album
"I Love You So"	2013	non-album single
"Mewy" (radio-only)	2014	No Bad Days
"Technicolor Yawn"	2014	No Bad Days
"Betonowy las" (radio-only)	2014	No Bad Days
"Betonowy las" (Ptaki remix)	2014	non-album single
"Nie gotujemy"	2015	Sea You Later

=== Music videos ===
Title	Year	Director
"Technicolor Yawn"	2014	Arkadiusz Nowakowski
"Betonowy las"	2015	Arkadiusz Nowakowski
"Nie gotujemy"	2015	Filip Szmidt
