= Bletka =

Polish singer and songwriter

- Born: Aleksandra Bletek
- Origin: Kraków, Poland
- Occupations: Singer; songwriter
- Years active: 2023–present

Aleksandra Bletek, known professionally as Bletka, is a Polish singer and songwriter.

== Early life and education ==
Bletek comes from Kraków. She studied at the University School of Physical Education in Kraków.

== Career ==
In February 2023, Bletka released her debut single "Teraz Ziemi". She gained prominence with the release the single "Taxi", in which she recorded with rapper Kizo, The single was certified triple diamond domestically. On 13 February 2024, Kizo and Bletka released another hit, entitled "Hero", and the single was certified triple platinum.

Since September 2023, Bletka has been associated with the spacerange agency.

== Discography ==
=== Singles ===
Year	Title	Certification	Sales
2023	"Teraz wiem"		
2023	"Taxi" (with Kizo)	ZPAV: 3× Diamond	POL: 750,000+
2023	"Trochę lżej"		
2023	"Chcę zapomnieć"		
2024	"Melatoninka"		
2024	"Hero" (with Kizo)	ZPAV: 3× Platinum	POL: 150,000+
2024	"B012"		
2024	"BOOMBOO" (with Kizo)		
2024	"AWAYY"		
2024	"NA BRZEGU" (with Kizo)		
2024	"STER"		
