= Quebonafide =

Polish rapper and singer

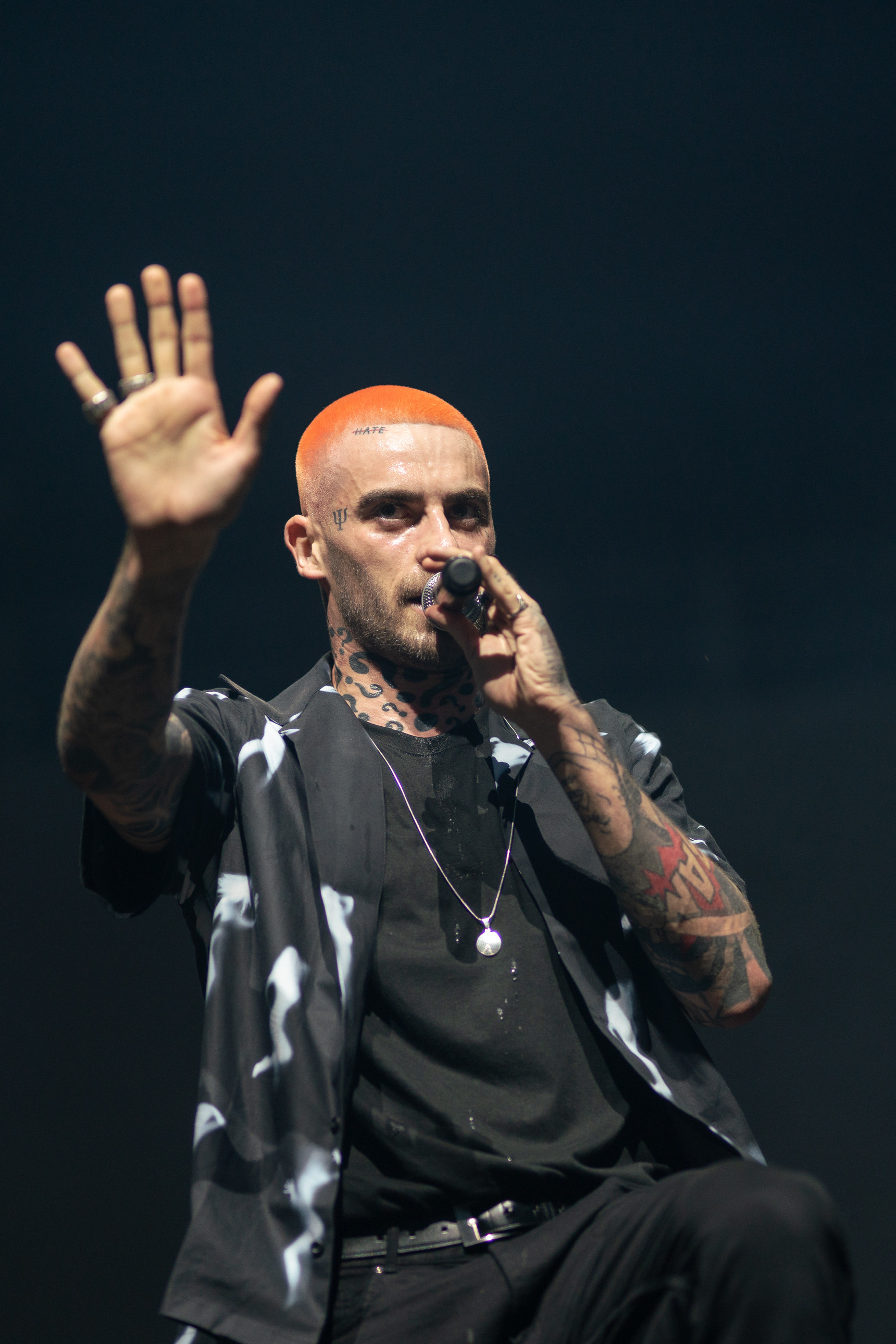
- Quebonafide performing in Warsaw in 2018.

Background information
- Also known as: Quebo, Que
- Born: Kuba Grabowski; 7 July 1991 (age 35); Ciechanów, Poland
- Origin: Warsaw, Poland
- Genres: Hip hop; pop; trap
- Occupations: Rapper; singer; songwriter
- Years active: 2008–2025
- Labels: QueQuality; Taconafidex
- Member of: Yochimu, Taconafide
- Website: queshop.pl

Kuba Grabowski (born 7 July 1991), better known by his stage names Quebonafide and Jakub Grabowski, is a Polish rapper, singer and songwriter. He is a member of the duos Yochimu and Taconafide, and the founder of the record label QueQuality.

With over 350 thousand albums sold, he is one of Poland's best-selling rappers. His biggest success thus far – the Soma 0.5 mg album, recorded with the rapper Taco Hemingway – has sold more than 150 thousand copies. Also his solo album Egzotyka proved successful, selling over 150 thousand copies. His albums have repeatedly won the status of platinum, gold and diamond records. The rapper has authored such hits as 'Candy', 'Bubbletea' or 'Tamagotchi'. Five-time nominee for the Fryderyk award, with one victory for Soma 0,5 mg in the Hip-Hop Album of the Year category. In 2018, his album Egzotyka was nominated for Empik Bestseller award in the Polish Music category.

== Education ==
He studied philosophy at the University of Warsaw.

== Music career ==
=== 2008–2014: Career beginnings ===
Initially, he was a member of the duo Yochimu, together with the rapper and producer Fuso. Since 2008, they have released three albums: Pierwsze cięcie, Drugie cięcie and Flow witam. In 2012, he took part in several freestyle battles. Over time, he captured the attention of the hip-hop community. He won the Battle for the End of the World and was a finalist in the Grand Battle of Warsaw. He also ranked second in the Raciąż Freestyle Battle and the Battle of September. In 2013, he earned popularity by releasing Eklektyka mixtape on 31 July, with the SB Maffija label. The mixtape gave Quebo recognition in the Polish hip-hop community, and translated into invitations to concert tours with SB Maffija. More and more often he was featured as a guest rapper, and eventually on 18 November 2013 he released the single 'Tarot' with the guest appearance of Justyna Kuśmierczyk, followed by the unlicensed 'Album of the Year' released on 31 December 2013 together with the rapper Eripe. The album enjoyed a positive response from the audience. In 2014, Quebonafide became even more popular after appearing on Pawbeats's Utopia, on the track 'Euforia'. The song was broadcast on RMF, Eska, Polskie Radio Szczecin and Polskie Radio Trójka radio stations, reached the 3rd position on the RMF Hop Bęc chart.

=== 2014–2015: Ezoteryka ===
In 2014, he released the single 'Żadnych zmartwień' featuring Kuban and Kuba Knap, thus announcing his first official album. On 1 April 2014, the second single 'Hype' was released. On 15 July, he published the 'Hype' video and founded the QueQuality label together with a clothing store, and on 28 July, the third single 'Ciernie' was released, with a guest appearance by Deys. The next singles were Carnival (release date 19 November) and 'Trip' (2 December 2014). On 20 December, during the rapper's concert in the Warsaw-based niePowiem club, the rapper known as Pih forced his way onto the stage and, grabbed a microphone and shouted, "This is not hip-hop and never will be!", after which he was escorted off the stage security staff. On 22 December 2014, Quebo's album was illegally published online in an unfinished version, due to producers' negligence. Despite attempts to remove the tracks from the Internet, the album remained available for download. On 17 February 2015, the pre-sale of the album began, the date of its release was revealed, and the rapper announced that the Erotyka mixtape will be added to the album. Also on 17 February, four singles premiered: 'Voodoo', 'Kyrie Eleison' featuring Guzior, 'Powszechny i śmiertelny', and 'Ile Mogłem' with the guest appearance of K-Leah.

His debut album entitled Ezoteryka was released on 27 March 2015, becoming no. 1 of Poland's Official Sales Chart (OLiS). With over 15 thousand copies sold, it received a gold record award. The album was nominated for the title of the 2015 Polish Rap Album of the Year in the WuDoo and Hip-hop.pl plebiscite. The single from the 'Hype' album was nominated for the 2014 Sztos award and the 2014 Polish Rap Single by WuDoo and Hip-hop.pl. After the album's release, the rapper went on his first tour entitled Ezoteryka Tour. The album was ranked 41 st best-selling record in Poland. On 2 December 2015, the rapper recorded a minialbum with rapper Białas, making it available free of charge on YouTube. The CD version was included in the pre-sale of Białas' album Rehab. Initially released in one thousand copies, the minialbum went up to 3 thousand copies due to high interest.

=== 2015–2018: Egzotyka ===
On 1 April 2015, Quebo revealed that his new album would be entitled Egzotyka, with each song describing a different part of the world, including a music video recorded in a given region. On 18 November 2015, the first single 'Oh my Buddha' was released, with a video made in Thailand, followed by the second single 'Quebahombre' (on 18 February 2016) with a video recorded in Mexico. The song reached the 14 th place in the RMF radio charts. On 17 May 2016, two singles were released: 'Szejk' and 'Bollywood', with the guest appearance of Czesław Mozil, the former shot in Dubai and the latter in India. On 17 June 2016, the Hip-hop 2.0 compilation album of the QueQuality label was issued, making its debut on the 3 rd place of the OLiS chart. On 10 July 2016, the album's fifth single, 'Luís Nazário de Lima', was released with a video recorded in Brazil.

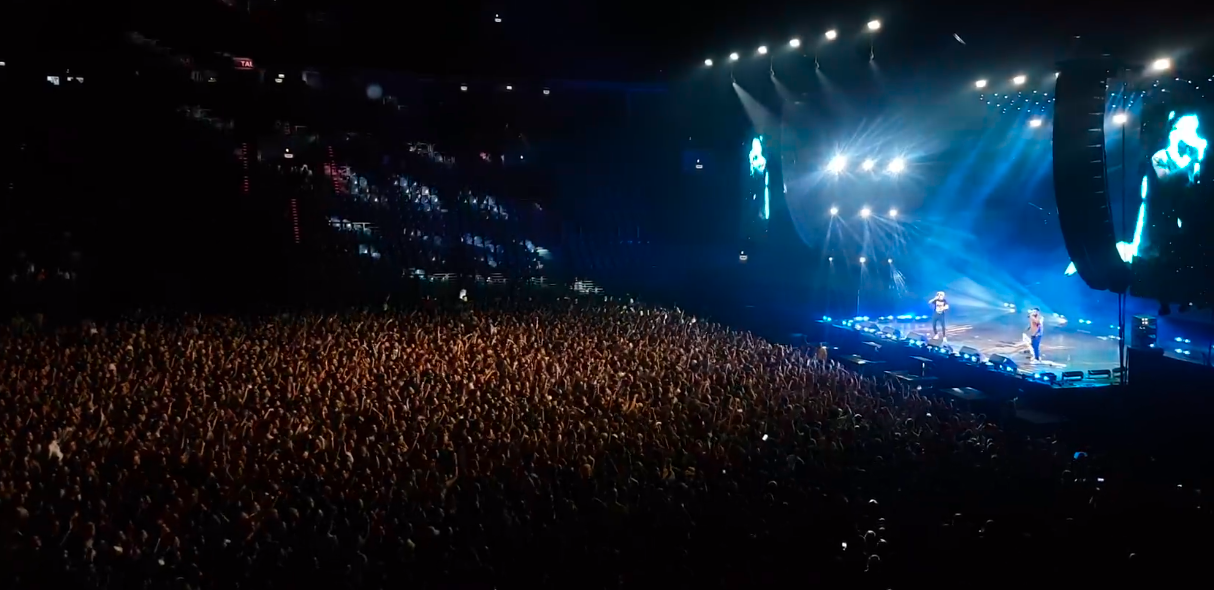
Rapper during the Ekodiesel Tour in 2018.

On 27 October 2016, Quebo released the single 'Madagascar', with a clip shot in Madagascar. The song reached the 1st place in the Hip-hop.tv station's charts. On 11 November, he made a guest appearance with the African rapper iFani in 'Sushi Dip', which was broadcast on MTV. On 11 April 2017, he released a single ''Changa' featuring rapper iFani, with a video shot in South Africa. On the same day, the pre-sale of the album began, the date of the album's release was announced and the album's cover with the tracklist was presented.

On 18 April 2017, another single 'C'est la vie' was released, together with a clip recorded in Paris, and on 28 April, yet another single 'Zorza' shot in Iceland. The song reached the first place in Hip-hop.tv station's charts. On 2 May, Quebo released the single 'Między słowami' together with the Canadian rapper Young Lungs, with a video shot in Japan. A week later, he presented the single 'Arabska noc' with guest appearances by rappers Solar and Wac Toja, with a video recorded in Morocco. On 16 May, he released the single 'To nie jest hip-hop' featuring the American rapper KRS-One, together with a video shot in the United States. A week later, on 23 May, he presented the single 'Bumerang' shot in Australia, and on 6 June, the single 'Odyseusz' with a video made in Poland; thus the entire album was released as singles.

The album was pre-ordered by 30 000 people, thus gaining a platinum status. It debuted as no. 1 best-selling album in Poland in OLiS charts and remained in 1 st place for three weeks. It was also the best-selling album in Poland in June and the second best-selling album in July 2017. The pre-ordered album was accompanied by mixtapes 'For male fans of Eklektyka EP' and 'For female fans of Euforia EP' enclosed according to gender. On 30 August, Quebo released a minialbum entitled No To Bajka EP, recorded with producer Matheo. The leading theme of the album are elements from Disney stories. The whole edition sold out in record time – less than an hour. Egzotyka was Poland's best-selling album in 2017 and was nominated for 2017 Empik Bestsellers award in the category of Polish Music. The rapper was not nominated for the 2018 Fryderyk awards for Egzotyka in the 'Hip-Hop Album of the Year' category, which was widely criticised in the media and social media.

=== 2018–2019: Taconafide, original book and a career break ===
In October 2017, Quebo announced a temporary suspension of social media presence. As he explained in an interview, this was expected to help him work on his new album. In 2018, the media reported that the artist was to record a joint album with the rapper Taco Hemingway. In March 2018, the rumours were confirmed by the rappers themselves. On 16 March 2018, the QueQuality YouTube channel featured the first single 'Art-B' promoting the joint album, and revealed the name of the album, SOMA 0.5 mg, the premiere being scheduled for 13 April 2018, with pre-order on a dedicated website. Within a few hours after its release, the song reached the first place on YouTube's 'Trending' tab. The artists decided to release the album under the name Taconafide, as a combination of their stage names. They announced a joint tour promoting the album in Poland, called Ekodiesel Tour. On 22 March 2018, they released their second single 'Tamagotchi' together with a video. The song broke Ed Sheeran's record in the category of Spotify's most-streamed singles in Poland. For a week, the song was a number 1 hit of YouTube's ';Trending' tab, reaching over 2 million views in 24 hours. On 27 March, the rappers revealed extras to the limited edition along with mysterious graphics announcing guest appearances on the bonus album. On 1 April, they released the entire tracklist of the main album and the bonus called 0,25 mg. They also revealed the names of producers and guests on the bonus CD: Bedoes, Kękę, Paluch, Kaz Bałagane, Dawid Podsiadło and Białas. On 4 April, they released another single, 'Metallica 808', and five days later, a single 'Kryptowaluty' with a video. On 13 April, the album Soma 0,5 mg premiered. A few days later, the bonus material entitled 0,25 mg was also made available on streaming services and artists' YouTube channels.

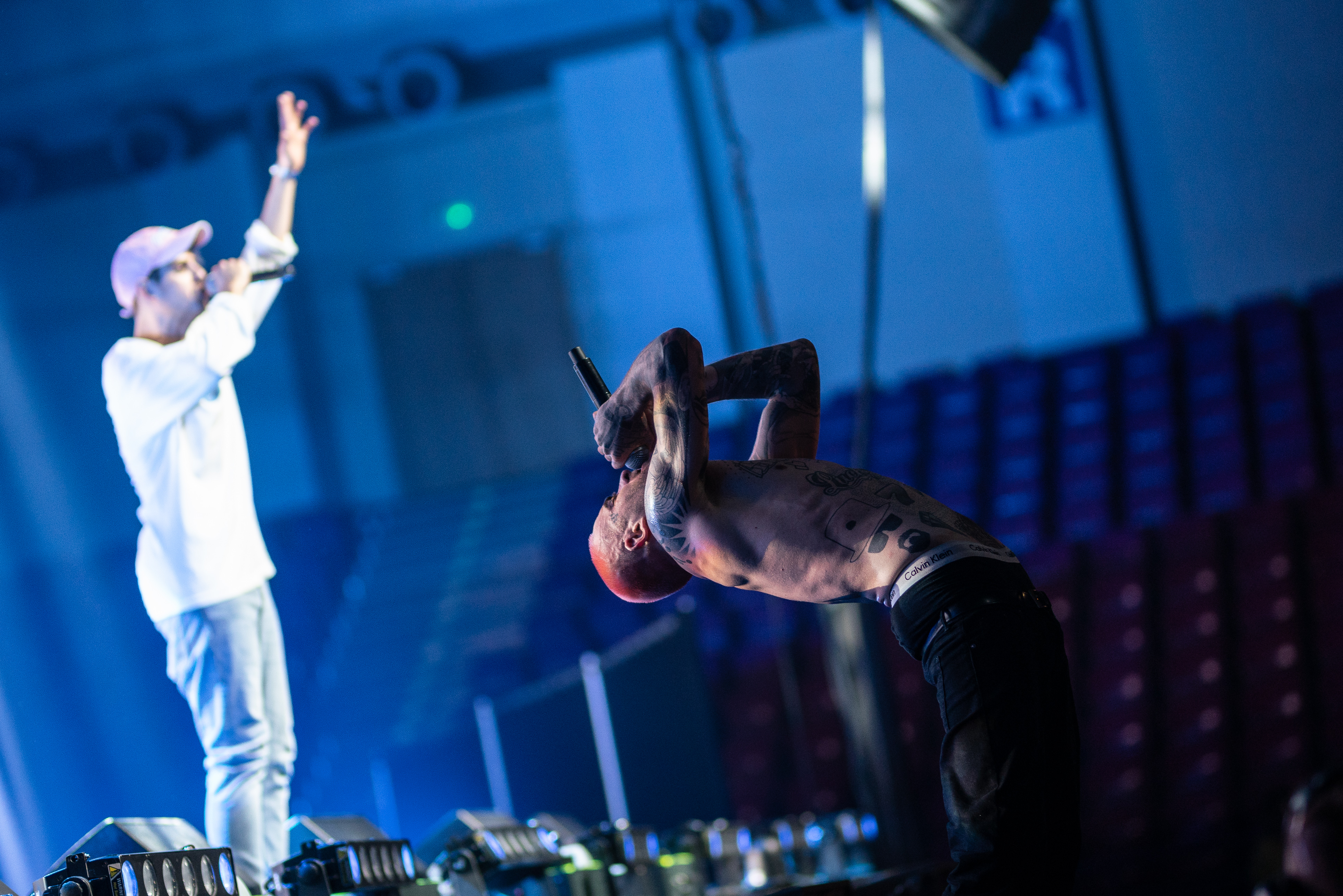
Quebonafide with Taco Hemingway in 2018.

The album made its debut on the 1st place of Poland's Official Sales Chart (OLiS), selling over 30 000 copies and gaining the status of a platinum record. It was also the best-selling album in Poland in April and May 2018. On 4 July, the album was awarded double platinum status for selling 60 000 copies. It was also the best-selling album of the first half of the year in Poland. On 6 July, the rappers performed at the Open'er Festival in Gdynia, earlier having announced that it would be their last concert as a duo. According to media reports, the rappers attracted an audience of several dozen thousand, comparable to the evening's star Gorillaz, making it the largest audience for a Polish performer in the history of Open'er.

On 8 September 2018, Quebonafide announced a career break because of the death of Mac Miller – a very important person in his life to whom, as Quebo noted in his post, heowes who he is, "A person without whom all the things in my life would never exist". On 13 October, during the Quefestival in Katowice, he received a triple platinum certificate for selling over 90 000 copies of Egzotyka. On 19 October 2019, during the Quefestival in Katowice, he received a diamond status certificate for selling over 150 000 copies of Egzotyka. Also in 2019, the Soma 0.5 mg reached a diamond status. On 28 September 2019, Quebo made a guest appearance at Dawid Podsiadło and Taco Hemingway's concert at the sold-out National Stadium in Warsaw.

=== 2020–2021: Romantic Psycho and an original documentary ===
On 7 February 2020, the first single entitled 'Romantic Psycho' was released, featuring Taco Hemingway, where the rapper comes to terms with the past. On 10 February, another single 'Jesień' was released, accompanied by a video – in a similarly depressive mood, with the guest appearance of Natalia Szroeder. It also launched the pre-sale of the album Romantic Psycho. In the video and on the cover of the album, the rapper showed a completely different image – the characteristic tattoos disappeared from his body, and the overall appearance resembled that of his college days. On 15 February 2020, the musician performed on the morning show Dzień Dobry TVN, where he presented the new image. Usually known for his crazy and explosive character, the rapper introduced himself as a quiet and shy guy. He also announced his tour promoting the album Romantic Psycho Experience, calling it an 'experience' rather than a tour. The artist also announced his participation in Ten to One show and an appearance in Kuba Wojewódzki's talk show. Due to the coronavirus epidemic, the tour as well as the production of shows featuring the rapper were postponed. The musician also posted his new image on the Instagram, with comical photos contrasting with his former style.

On 13 March, the third single 'Przytobie' was released, where the rapper criticised Polish stand-up comedians, celebrities and divisions in the Polish hip-hop community. The premiere of the album was originally announced for 20 March, but after a few days Quebo admitted a mistake and announced that the album would be released on 27 March 2020. On 27 March, the album was issued, receiving very negative reviews, while the tracks sounded as if they had not been properly completed.

On 1 April 2020, a single entitled 'Szubienicapestycydybroń' was released, with a music video in which Quebonafide abandons the shy boy's style and tattoos reappear on his body. The single addresses actor Sebastian Fabijański, among others, and between the second verse and the chorus there is a fragment mocking talk shows. Janusz Chabior, as the host, tried interview Quebo. Thus, it is revealed that the first album was only a limited bonus and the actual album began to reach the audience and appeared on streaming platforms. The album was published in two versions. The first one – Japanese – with three additional tracks, available to order from the rapper's website. The second – European – available for purchase in all music shops.

Romantic Psycho made its debut on the first place of the OLiS chart, and Quebo scooped top three positions, with Egzotyka in second place and Ezoteryka ranking third. A total of Quebo's five albums made it to the OLiS charts at the same time. Only Taco Hemingway has had more – seven. Romantic Psycho topped the charts five times, which is a historical result in Polish hip-hop. Like the two previous albums (Egzotyka and Soma 0,5 mg), the new record sold 30 000 copies even before the official release, gaining a platinum status. The official platinum album certificate was awarded on 30 April 2020, and on 13 August a double platinum status was reached for over 60 000 copies sold. It was also Poland's best-selling album in April, and the second best-selling album in May. The record also enjoyed high streaming results – each track has over one million views on YouTube ('Bubbletea' with 31 million views and 'Szubienicapestycydybroń' with 19 million). As part of the promotion campaign, the rapper released a documentary entitled Quebonafide: Romantic Psycho Film, presenting the creative process behind the new album and the backstage of the promotional campaign. The film was screened in cinemas and tickets sold out in pre-orders.

Later in 2020 and 2021 he released standalone singles: 'Teen Kasia', 'Matcha Latte', and 'Utwór z okazji dwóch milionów na Spotify'. He was also featured on Tommy Cash's 'Benz Dealer', Mata's 'Papuga', and Kinny Zimmer's 'Beanz Dealer'.

=== 2021–2022: MISS TI 蒂小姐 and alter ego Jakub Grabowski ===
On February 9, 2022, Quebonafide and DJ and producer Forxst launched the Miss Ti 蒂小姐 project. It is a brand of vegan matcha latte and milk tea, which firstly appeared in the offer of Lidl store.

On June 5, 2022, Quebonafide released a song called 'Refren trochę jak Lana Del Rey'. Along with the release of the song, he tweeted that he no longer has anything planned as a Quebonafide, however, we can still expect the singles he's been recording for the past 24 months to be released in a more messy mixtape form. He also wrote, "starting in September, I'm going to start medical school, devote myself to academics, healthy food production and the MISS TI 蒂小姐 concept, playing the piano and most importantly gluing this whole conglomerate of items together."

On August 23, 2022, he released a song called 'Mój przykry life (Jakub On Stage)' adopting a new stage name – Jakub Grabowski.

On October 11, 2022, he and other artists participating in SB Starter competition released a song called 'Łapacz snów'.

=== 2024–2025: the single “Futurama 3 (fanserwis)”, the album and film Północ / Południe, and the final concert ===
On 21 November 2024, he released the single “Futurama 3 (fanserwis)” along with a music video directed by Andrzej Dragan. The song reached the number one position on the OLiS – single w streamie chart and was awarded the Fryderyk Award 2025 in the category of Hip Hop Single of the Year.

On 26 June 2025, a ticketed online broadcast of the musical film Północ / Południe was held, in which he performed and presented new songs. The television premiere of the film is scheduled for November 22, 2025 on Canal+. On 27 and 28 June 2025, he played two farewell concerts at the stadium PGE Narodowy in Warsaw. On 4 July 2025, he released the studio album Północ / Południe.

== Activities outside music ==
On 12 September 2016, he acted as a sports commentator on the Canal+ Sport channel. In August 2018, he joined the KTS Weszło Warsaw football club. He appeared in an ad promoting a new clothing campaign of Nike (2017). In spring 2019, together with Kuba Stemplowski, he published a book entitled 'Egzotyka. Wywiad-rzeka', describing the rapper's journey through the 70 countries he visited while working on his album Egzotyka.

On 1 April 2020, Quebonafide was a guest of Kuba Wojewódzki in his show '250m² of Kuba Wojewódzki'. In an interview, Kuba talked about his career break, his life in quarantine and about the album Romantic Psycho. On 3 April 2020, he was a guest of Tomasz Smokowski on the YouTube 'Sports Channel, where he answered questions from the host and from the audience – mainly about his musical activity and passion for sports.

He appeared in the show 'Creeps' of Ciechanowska Telewizja Kablowa (CTK), where he earned 1 million PLN from the Allegro platform. All the income from the campaign and the income from the sale of his clothing collection at allegro.pl was allocated for the purchase of instruments for children from a brass band in Ciechanów, as well as for supporting an animal shelter in Pawłowo, for the purchase of equipment for non-invasive breathing support in newborns at the Specialist Hospital in Ciechanów, for renovation and furnishing of the Society of Children's Friends in Ciechanów, and for supporting the foundation 'Giving strength to children'.

In the first half of 2022 he signed his Instagram, Snapchat and TikTok profiles with a pseudonym 'vetulani'.

== Private life ==
He was in an eleven-year relationship with Roksana, with whom he later got engaged. He dedicated several songs to her, including 'Love', 'Candy' or 'Bogini', the latter accompanied by a video of the artist together with his partner in an erotic setting. Used to be in a relationship with polish singer Natalia Szroeder, who has made guest appearances in such Quebonafide songs as 'JESIEŃ' or 'TĘSKNIEZASTARYMKANYE'.

== Awards and nominations ==
Five nominations for the Fryderyk Award, with one victory in the Hip-Hop Album of the Year for Soma 0,5 mg. Two nominations for the Empik Bestseller award in the Polish Music category for Soma 0.5 mg and Egzotyka. Three nominations for Onet's Best title and twelve nominations in the WuDoo/Hip-Hop plebiscite, including one victory for Soma 0.5 mg.

Berlin Music Video Awards

The Berlin Music Video Awards is an international festival that promotes the art of music videos. In 2025 Quebonafide's music video Futurama 3 won the category 'Best Visual Effects'.

== Discography ==
=== Studio albums ===
| Title | Album details | Peak chart positions | Sales | Certifications |
| Title | Album details | POL | Sales | Certifications |
|---|---|---|---|---|
| Pierwsze cięcie (with Fuso as Yochimu) | Released: 2 May 2009; Type: bootleg | | | |
| Drugie cięcie (with Fuso as Yochimu) | Released: 20 August 2010; Type: bootleg | | | |
| Eklektyka | Released: 31 July 2013; Label: SB Maffija; Format: CD, LP, digital download | | POL: 600 | |
| Płyta roku (with Eripe) | Released: 31 December 2013; Label: Patokalipsa; Format: CD, LP, digital download | | | |
| Ezoteryka | Released: 27 March 2015; Label: QueQuality; Format: CD, LP, digital download | 1 | POL: 30,000+ | ZPAV: Platinum |
| Egzotyka | Released: 9 June 2017; Label: QueQuality; Format: CD, LP, DVD, digital download | 1 | POL: 150,000+ | ZPAV: Diamond |
| Soma 0,5 mg (with Taco Hemingway as Taconafide) | Released: 13 July 2018; Label: Taconafidex; Format: CD, LP, digital download | 1 | POL: 150,000+ | ZPAV: Diamond |
| Romantic Psycho | Released: 1 April 2020; Label: QueQuality; Format: CD, digital download | 1 | POL: 150,000+ | ZPAV: Diamond |
| Północ / Południe OST | Released: 4 July 2025; Label: Magnetowid; Format: CD, box set, digital download | 1 | | |

=== Compilation album ===
| Title | Album details | Peak chart positions | Sales | Certifications |
| Title | Album details | POL | Sales | Certifications |
|---|---|---|---|---|
| Hip-Hop 2.0 | Released: 17 June 2015; Label: QueQuality; Format: CD | 3 | POL: 15,000+ | ZPAV: Gold |

=== EPs ===
| Title | Album details | Peak chart positions | Sales | Certifications |
| Title | Album details | POL | Sales | Certifications |
|---|---|---|---|---|
| Flow Witam EP (with Fuso as Yochimu) | Released: 20 July 2012; Type: bootleg | | | |
| Demówka EP (with Białas) | Released: 4 December 2015; Label: QueQuality; Format: CD, digital download | | | |
| Dla Fanów Eklektyki (Egzotyka bonus CD) | Released: 9 June 2017; Label: QueQuality; Format: CD, digital download | 10 | | |
| Dla Fanek Euforii (Egzotyka bonus CD) | Released: 9 June 2017; Label: QueQuality; Format: CD, digital download | 16 | | |
| No To Bajka EP (with Matheo) | Released: 30 August 2017; Label: QueQuality; Format: CD | | | |
| 0,25 mg EP (with Taco Hemingway as Taconafide) (Soma 0,5 mg bonus CD) | Released: 13 April 2018; Label: Taconafidex; Format: Bonus CD, digital download | 44 | | |
| Wschód / Zachód EP (Północ / Południe preorder bonus) | Released: 4 July 2025; Label: Magnetowid; Format: Bonus CD in preordered box set | | | |

=== Mixtapes ===
| Title | Album details | Peak chart positions | Sales | Certifications |
| Title | Album details | POL | Sales | Certifications |
|---|---|---|---|---|
| Erotyka | Released: 27 March 2015; Label: QueQuality; Format: CD, digital download | | | |
| Elektryka (Hip-hop 2.0 preorder bonus) | Released: 17 June 2016; Label: QueQuality; Format: Bonus CD, digital download | | | |
| Krętacz z Ciechanowa (Północ / Południe preorder bonus) | Released: 4 July 2025; Label: Magnetowid; Format: Bonus CD in preordered box set | | | |

== Singles ==
| Title | Year | Peak chart positions | Certifications | Album |
| Title | Year | POL | Certifications | Album |
|---|---|---|---|---|
| „Żadnych zmartwień" (with Kuban, Kuba Knap) | 2014 | — | | Ezoteryka |
| „Hype" | 2014 | — | | Ezoteryka |
| „Ciernie" (with Deys) | 2014 | — | | Ezoteryka |
| „Trip" | 2014 | — | | Ezoteryka |
| „Voodoo" | 2015 | — | | Ezoteryka |
| „Ile mogłem" (with K-Leah) | 2015 | — | | Ezoteryka |
| „Oh My Buddha" | 2016 | — | | Egzotyka |
| „Quebahombre" | 2016 | — | | Egzotyka |
| „Szejk" | 2016 | — | | Egzotyka |
| „Bollywood" (with Czesław Mozil) | 2016 | — | | Egzotyka |
| „Luís Nazário de Lima" | 2016 | — | | Egzotyka |
| „Madagaskar" | 2016 | — | | Egzotyka |
| „Changa" (with iFani) | 2017 | — | | Egzotyka |
| „C’est la Vie" | 2017 | — | | Egzotyka |
| „Zorza" | 2017 | — | | Egzotyka |
| „Między słowami" (with Young Lungs) | 2017 | — | | Egzotyka |
| „Arabska noc" (with Solar, Wac Toja) | 2017 | — | | Egzotyka |
| „To nie jest hip-hop" (with KRS-One) | 2017 | — | | Egzotyka |
| „Hypebea" (with Sfera Ebbasta) | 2017 | — | | Egzotyka |
| „Bumerang" | 2017 | — | | Egzotyka |
| „Kawa i Xanax" (with PlanBe) | 2017 | — | | Egzotyka |
| „Odyseusz" | 2017 | — | | Egzotyka |
| „Candy" (with Klaudia Szafrańska) | 2017 | 44 | ZPAV: Diamond | Egzotyka |
| "Art-B" (with Taco Hemingway as Taconafide) | 2018 | — | | Soma 0,5 mg |
| "Tamagotchi" (with Taco Hemingway as Taconafide) | 2018 | 22 | | Soma 0,5 mg |
| "Metallica 808" (with Taco Hemingway as Taconafide) | 2018 | — | | Soma 0,5 mg |
| "Kryptowaluty" (with Taco Hemingway as Taconafide) | 2018 | — | | Soma 0,5 mg |
| „Romanticpsycho" (with Taco Hemingway) | 2020 | — | | Romantic Psycho |
| „Jesień" (with Natalia Szroeder) | 2020 | — | | Romantic Psycho |
| „Przytobie" | 2020 | — | | Romantic Psycho |
| „Szubienicapestycydybroń" | 2020 | 39 | | Romantic Psycho |
| „Bubbletea" (with Daria Zawiałow) | 2020 | 7 | | Romantic Psycho |
| „Teen Kasia" | 2020 | — | | non-album singles |
| „Matcha latte" (with Mick Jenkins) | 2020 | — | | non-album singles |
| „Refren trochę jak Lana Del Rey" | 2022 | — | | non-album singles |
"—" denotes a title that did not chart.

=== As featured artist ===
| Title | Year | Peak chart positions | Certifications | Album |
| Title | Year | POL | Certifications | Album |
|---|---|---|---|---|
| ReTo – „Sorry Dolores" (with Quebonafide) | 2018 | 37 | ZPAV: 2× Platinum | BOA |
"—" denotes a title that did not chart.
