= Mrozu =

Polish musician and record producer

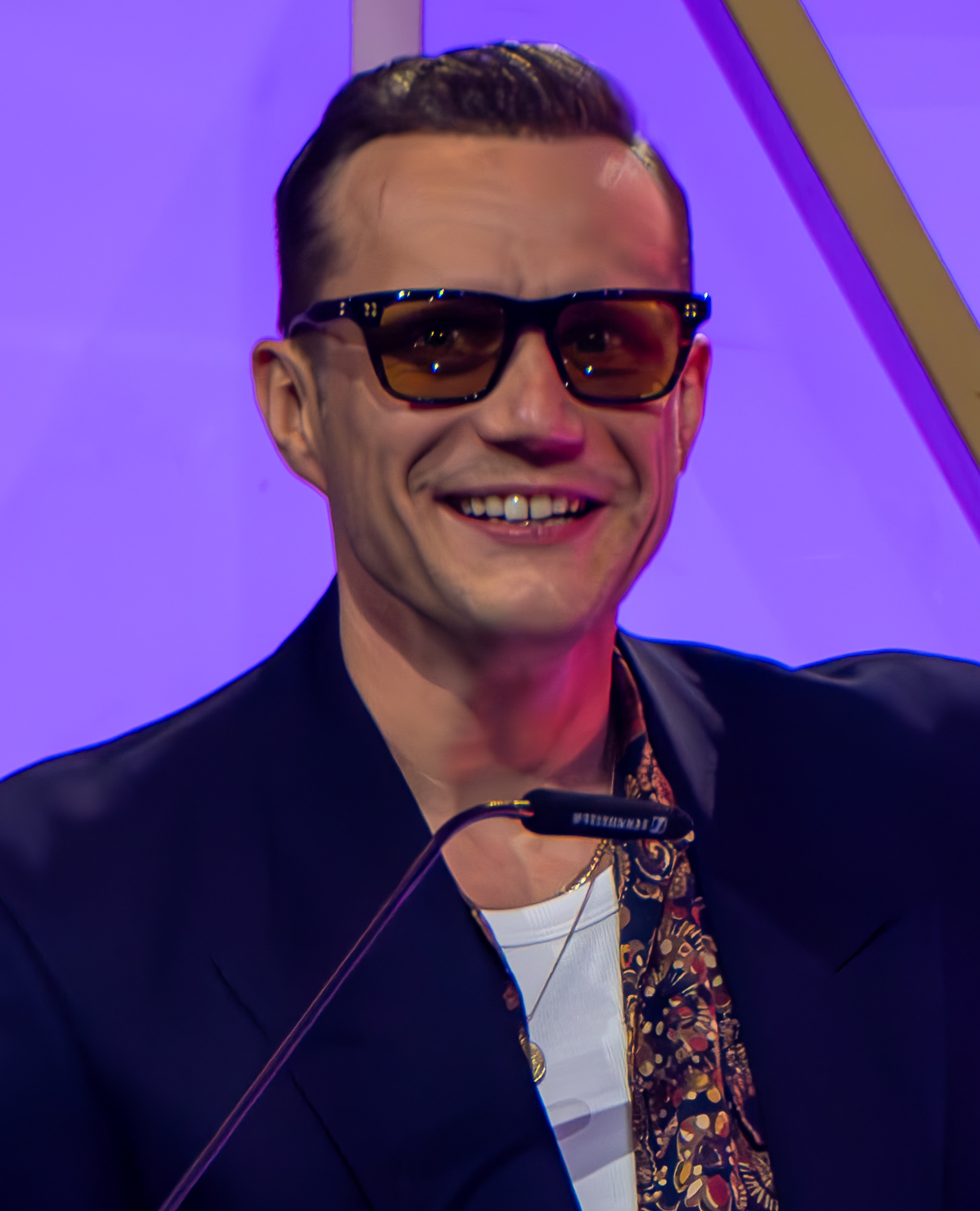
Mrozu, 2024

Łukasz Błażej Mróz (born July 22, 1986) better known under the stage name Mrozu, is a Polish singer, composer and producer from Wrocław. As a vocalist, he performs music of type described as "on the border of pop and R&B".

== Discography ==
=== Personal albums ===
- 2009: Miliony monet (album)
- 2010: Vabank (album)
- 2017: Zew (album)
- 2019: Aura (Mrozu album)
- 2022: Złote bloki

== Awards ==
- 2010: Viva Comet Awards: Debut of the Year
- 2014: Eska Music Awards: 2 awards: Best artist, Best Video
- 2023: Fryderyk: 4 awards: Author of the Year, Pop/rock Album of the Year (Złote bloki), Song of the Year ("Za daleko"), Producer of the Year
- 2024: Fryderyk: 2 awards: Concert Records, New Performance
