= Kayah discography =

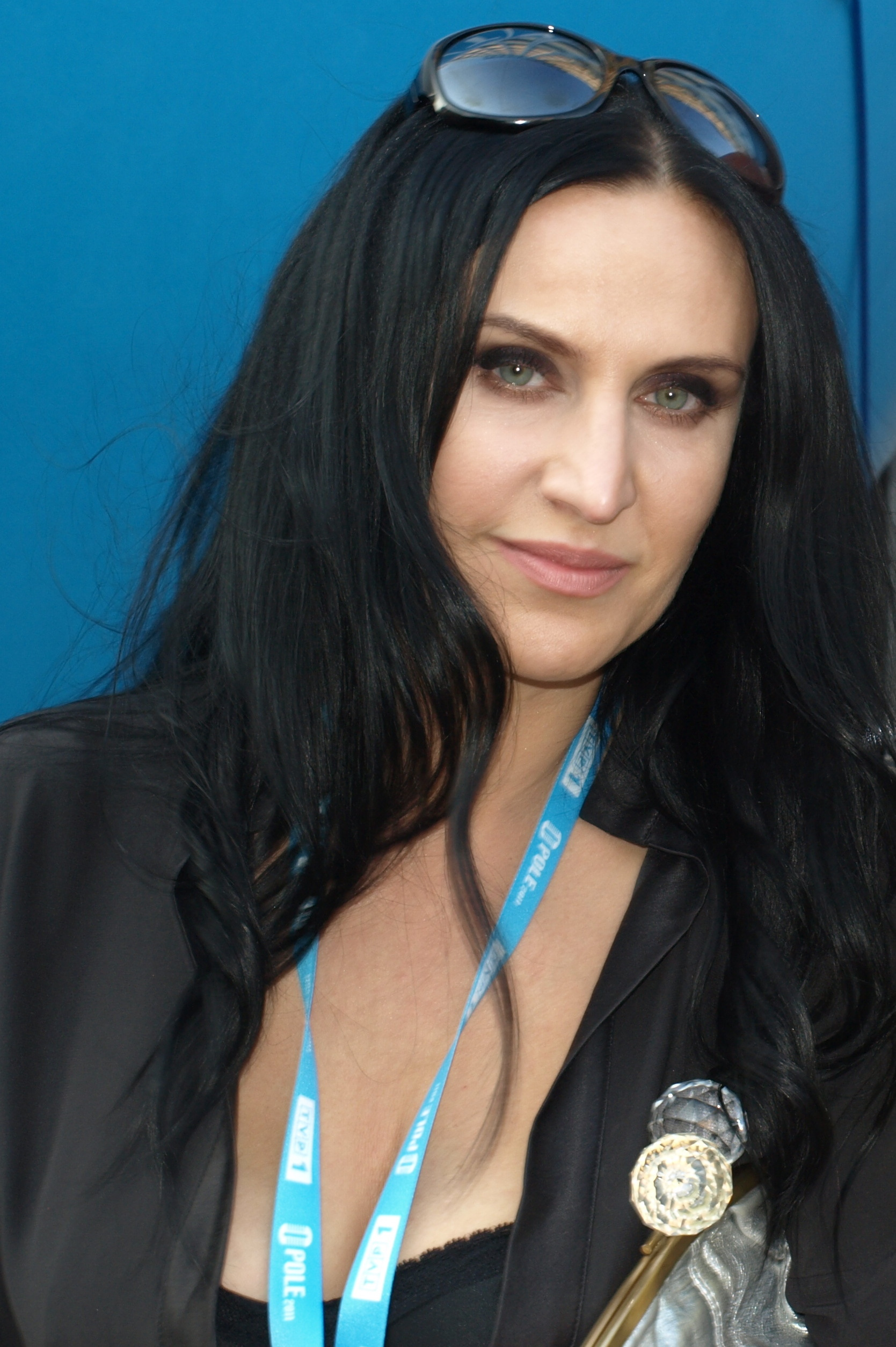
- Kayah in 2011
- Studio albums: 11
- Extended plays: 1
- Live albums: 1
- Compilation albums: 2
- Singles: 64

Kayah discography consists of eleven studio albums (three of which are collaborative albums), one live album, two compilation albums, one extended play (EP) and sixty-four singles (including nine as featured artist).

Kayah's debut album was released by Polskie Nagrania Muza. Between 1995 and 2005, her albums were released by Zic Zac and BMG Poland which morphed into Sony BMG Music Entertainment Poland. Since 2007, Kayah's subsequent albums have been released under her own label, Kayax. Five of her albums have been certified gold by ZPAV, four platinum, and one diamond. The singer has sold more than one million records in her native Poland.

== Albums ==
=== Studio albums ===
Title	Album details	Peak chart positions		Sales	Certifications
Title	Album details	POL^{[A]}	POL (Vinyl)^{[B]}	Sales	Certifications
Kayah^{[C]}	Released: 1988; Label: Polskie Nagrania Muza; Formats: LP, cassette	—	—		
Kamień	Released: 5 November 1995; Label: Zic Zac/BMG Ariola Poland; Formats: CD, cassette	16	—		POL: Gold
Zebra	Released: 23 March 1997; Label: Zic Zac/BMG Ariola Poland; Formats: CD, cassette	2	—	POL: 200,000	POL: Platinum
Kayah i Bregović (with Goran Bregović)	Released: 12 April 1999; Label: Zic Zac/BMG Poland; Formats: CD, cassette	1	1	POL: 700,000	POL: Diamond
JakaJaKayah^{[D]}	Released: 15 May 2000; Label: Zic Zac/BMG Poland; Formats: CD, cassette	4	—	POL: 100,000	POL: Platinum
Stereo typ	Released: 25 August 2003; Label: Zic Zac/BMG Poland; Formats: CD, cassette	1	—	POL: 35,000	POL: Gold
Skała	Released: 14 September 2009; Label: Kayax/EMI Music Poland; Formats: CD, digital download	1	—	POL: 40,000	POL: Platinum
Kayah & Royal Quartet (with Royal String Quartet)	Released: 8 March 2010; Label: Agora; Formats: CD, digital download	—	—	POL: 20,000	POL: Gold
Panienki z temperamentem (with Renata Przemyk)	Released: 25 October 2010; Label: QM Music; Formats: CD, digital download	10	—	POL: 10,000	
Transoriental Orchestra	Released: 5 November 2013; Label: Kayax/Agora; Formats: CD, digital download	47	—	POL: 30,000	POL: Platinum
Gdy pada śnieg	Released: 4 November 2016; Label: Kayax/Agora; Formats: CD, digital download	7	—		
"—" denotes a recording that did not chart or incomplete data.

=== Live albums ===
Title	Album details	Peak chart positions	Sales	Certifications
Title	Album details	POL	Sales	Certifications
MTV Unplugged	Released: 23 March 2007; Label: Kayax; Formats: CD, digital download	4	POL: 15,000	POL: Gold
"—" denotes a recording that did not chart or incomplete data.

=== Compilation albums ===
Title	Album details	Peak chart positions	Sales	Certifications
Title	Album details	POL	Sales	Certifications
The Best & the Rest	Released: 2 May 2005; Label: Sony BMG Music Entertainment Poland; Formats: CD	1	POL: 15,000	POL: Gold
Największe przeboje^{[E]}	Released: 2011; Label: Sony Music; Formats: CD	—		
"—" denotes a recording that did not chart or incomplete data.

=== EPs ===
Title	Album details
Kolędy śpiewa Kayah	Released: 10 December 2006; Label: Kayax; Formats: CD, digital download

== Singles ==
=== As lead artist ===
Title	Year	Peak chart positions		Album
Title	Year	POL (Airplay)	POL (Clubs)^{[F]}	Album
"Córeczko"	1988	—	—	—N/a
"Jak liść"	1995	—	—	Kamień
"Nawet deszcz"	1995	7	—	Kamień
"Fleciki"	1996	19	—	Kamień
"Santana"	1996	—	—	Kamień
"Horyzont" (with Kasia Stankiewicz and Andrzej Krzywy)	1996	17	—	Ton nadaje Radio Zet (various artists compilation)
"Na językach"	1997	1	—	Zebra
"Supermenka"	1997	1	—	Zebra
"Uwierz... to nie ja" (with Urszula)	1997	7	—	Playboy Play... (various artists compilation)
"Śpij kochanie, śpij" (with Goran Bregović)	1999	6	—	Kayah i Bregović
"Prawy do lewego" (with Goran Bregović)	1999	—	—	Kayah i Bregović
"To nie ptak" (with Goran Bregović)	1999	5	—	Kayah i Bregović
"Nie ma, nie ma ciebie" (with Goran Bregović)	1999	—	—	Kayah i Bregović
"JakaJaKayah"	2000	9	—	JakaJaKayah
"Anioł wiedział"	2000	—	—	JakaJaKayah
"Topielice"	2000	—	—	JakaJaKayah
"Wiosna przyjdzie i tak"	2001	—	—	Przedwiośnie (soundtrack)
"Embarcação" (with Cesária Évora)	2001	—	—	JakaJaKayah (special edition)
"Dobry potwór nie jest zły" (with Michał Żebrowski)	2002	—	—	Poczytaj mi tato 2 (Michał Żebrowski album)
"Testosteron"	2003	2	—	Stereo typ
"Do D.N.A."	2004	—	—	Stereo typ
"Duchy tych co mieszkali tu"	2004	—	—	Mój brat niedźwiedź (soundtrack)
"Prócz ciebie, nic" (with Krzysztof Kiljański)	2004	1	—	The Best & the Rest
"Jutro rano"	2005	—	—	The Best & the Rest
"Kochankowie Roku Tygrysa"	2006	—	—	Kochankowie Roku Tygrysa (soundtrack)
"Wszystkie Ryśki to porządne chłopaki" (with Stanisław Tym)	2007	—	—	Ryś (soundtrack)
"Ding dong"	2008	20	—	Siła świątecznej muzyki! (various artists compilation)
"Jak skała"	2009	—	—	Skała
"Ocean spokojny już"	2009	—	—	Skała
"Dla ciebie jestem sobą" (with Renata Przemyk)	2010	—	—	Panienki z temperamentem
"Za późno"	2011	5	—	—N/a
"Rebeka"	2013	—	—	Transoriental Orchestra
"Kondja Mia, Kondja Mia"	2013	—	—	Transoriental Orchestra
"Pusty talerzyk"	2016	—	—	Gdy pada śnieg
"Gdy pada śnieg"	2016	—	—	Gdy pada śnieg
"Po co" (with Idan Raichel)	2017	3	24	—N/a
"Podatek od miłości" (with Grzegorz Hyży)	2017	5	—	—N/a
"Chwytaj dzień" (with Zbigniew Wodecki)	2018	84	—	Dobrze, że jesteś (Zbigniew Wodecki album)
"Czarna polana" (with Atanas Valkov)	2018	—	—	—N/a
"Supermenka 2018" (with KęKę)	2018	—	—	—N/a
"Miłość"	2018	—	—	Tischner. Mocna nuta (various artists compilation)
"Dawaj w długą"	2019	68	—	—N/a
"Ramię w ramię" (with Viki Gabor)	2020	4	—	Getaway (Into My Imagination) (Viki Gabor album)
"Ja chcę ciebie" (with Jan Smoczyński)	2020	—	—	—N/a
"Kayah #hot16challenge2"	2020	—	—	—N/a
"Królestwo kobiet" (with Mery Spolsky)	2020	—	—	—N/a
"To spotkanie" (with Małgorzata Kościelniak)	2020	—	—	—N/a
"Nie dzielcie nas" (with Krzysztof Iwaneczko)	2021	—	—	—N/a
"Kochaj różnym być" (with Nick Sinckler)	2021	—	—	—N/a
"Pod powieką (Preludium e-moll)" (with Natalia Kukulska)	2021	—	—	Czułe struny (Natalia Kukulska album)
"Niech zimy nie będzie" (with Arek Kłusowski and Michał Kmieciak)	2021	—	—	—N/a
"Odnaleźć siebie"	2022	—	—	—N/a
"Nie muszę" (with Julia Wieniawa)	2022	—	—	Kayah XX Rework (various artists compilation)
"Po co" (with Rat Kru)	2022	—	—	Kayah XX Rework (various artists compilation)
"Ganesha" (with Patricia Kazadi)	2023	—	—	Makasi 19–23 (Kazadi album)
"—" denotes a recording that did not chart or incomplete data.

=== As featured artist ===
Title	Year	Album
"Hit" (with Members of Pozytywne Wibracje)	1998	Pozytywne Wibracje 1 (various artists compilation)
"Amen" (with Věra Bílá and Chico & the Gypsies)	2001	Rovava (Věra Bílá album)
"Tylko ty i ja" (with Blenders)	2002	—N/a
"Najpiękniejsi" (with Poluzjanci)	2005	The Best & the Rest
"Skrucha" (with Jafia)	2015	KA RA VA NA (Jafia album)
"Róż i dusz" (with Pectus)	2016	Kobiety (Pectus album)
"Przejazdem" (with Pectus)	2020	Kobiety/Wojciech Młynarski (Pectus album)
"Kocham cię" (with Maria Sadowska)	2020	Początek nocy (Maria Sadowska album)
"Nisko jest niebo" (with Pezet)	2020	Muzyka współczesna (Pezet album)

== Notes ==
- A Polish albums sales chart OLiS was only launched in October 2000. Peak positions for Kayah's earlier albums are taken from reliable sales charts published weekly by Radio Bis and monthly by Gazeta Muzyczna.
- B Polish vinyl albums sales chart was only launched in 2017.
- C An English-language edition of Kayah was released in 1991 by Rogot.
- D JakaJaKayah was released internationally as YakaYaKayah.
- E Największe przeboje was re-released as Przeboje in 2015 as part of the Lubię polskie series.
- F Polish club play chart Top – Dyskoteki was only published between 2010 and 2018.
