= Skała (album) =

Studio album by Kayah
- Released: 14 September 2009
- Genres: Pop; soul
- Language: Polish
- Label: Kayax
- Producers: Kayah; Krzysztof Pszona

Kayah chronology
MTV Unplugged (2007)	Skała (2009)	Kayah & Royal Quartet (2010)

Professional ratings
Review scores
Source	Rating
Europopmusic	4/5 stars

Skała is a studio album by Polish singer Kayah, released in 2009 by Kayax.

== Background ==
Skała was Kayah's first studio album in six years and her first released by her own record label, Kayax (distributed by EMI Music Poland). The title ("rock" in Polish) is a nod to the singer's 1995 breakthrough album, Kamień ("stone"). Musically, Skała continues Kamień's soul and jazz-inspired sound. To promote the album, Kayah embarked on an acoustic concert tour and released two singles: "Jak skała" and "Ocean Spokojny już".

Skała debuted at number 1 in the Polish albums chart and was certified platinum the following month. By March 2011, the album had sold in nearly 40,000 copies. Skała was nominated to the Fryderyk award for the Pop Album of the Year and Best Artwork as well as for the Best Pop Album in the Superjedynki contest.

== Track listing ==
1. "Do diabła z przysłowiami" – 4:56
2. "Jak skała" – 4:40
3. "Ocean Spokojny już" – 3:39
4. "Marianna (z Gałczyńskich)" – 5:17
5. "Bursztynowa wieża" – 4:24
6. "Nie chcę niczego więcej" – 3:12
7. "Feniks z popiołu" – 2:38
8. "Lustro czeka" – 5:26
9. "Dla mnie to skarb" – 3:44
10. "Diamenty" – 6:12
11. "Na balkonie w Weronie" – 3:43

== Charts ==
Chart (2009)	Peak position
Polish Albums (OLiS)	1

== Certifications ==
Region	Certification	Certified units/sales
Poland (ZPAV)	Platinum	30,000
