= Zebra (Kayah album) =

Studio album by Kayah
- Released: 23 March 1997
- Genre: Pop; soul; disco; funk
- Length: 64:48
- Language: Polish; English
- Label: Zic Zac; BMG Poland
- Producer: Kayah; Michał Przytuła

Kayah chronology
Kamień (1995)	Zebra (1997)	Kayah i Bregović (1999)

Professional ratings
Review scores
Source	Rating
Europopmusic	3/5 stars
Machina	4/5 stars

Zebra is a studio album by Polish singer Kayah, released in 1997 by Zic Zac and BMG Poland. The album was a critical and commercial success, and spawned one of Kayah's biggest hits, "Na językach" and "Supermenka".

== Background ==
Musically, the album blends contemporary pop and the 1970s disco music with elements of soul and funk. All songs were written by Kayah, except for "Konferencja prasowa", co-written with Artur Affek, and two covers: The Doors' "Light My Fire" and Rod Stewart's "Da Ya Think I'm Sexy?". The album was supported by two singles: "Na językach", a song about gossiping, released in February 1997, and the feminist track "Supermenka", released in May 1997, accompanied by music video with a guest appearance by Ice-T. Both songs were number ones in the Polish airplay chart and remain one of Kayah's biggest hits to date.

Zebra was a commercial and critical success, outselling her previous album Kamień. It sold 100,000 copies within weeks after premiere and eventually shifted over 200,000 units, earning platinum certification in Poland. Official Polish album sales chart OLiS did not exist at the time, but the album reached number 2 in the reliable monthly sales chart published by Radio Bis. Zebra also won the Fryderyk award for the Pop Album of the Year.

== Track listing ==
1. "Na dobry początek" – 0:30
2. "Na językach" – 4:30
3. "Supermenka" – 3:36
4. "Serce jak szafa" – 6:50
5. "Light My Fire" – 3:56
6. "Uratujcie go" – 4:09
7. "Konferencja prasowa" – 6:06
8. "Niewidzialna" – 5:19
9. "Cogito ergo non sum" – 4:18
10. "Da Ya Think I'm Sexy" – 4:22
11. "Cicho tu" – 6:35
12. "Moja sukienka" – 5:34
13. "Im więcej tym mniej" – 3:55
14. "Wszystko się skończyło" – 5:08

== Personnel ==
- Kayah – vocals, keyboards, loops, production
- Michał Przytuła – keyboards, loops, music programming, mixing, production, mastering
- Krzysztof Pszona – piano (2–8, 10–14)
- Krzysztof Herdzin – piano (4, 11)
- Artur Affek – guitar (2–11)
- Michał Grymuza – guitar (14)
- Artur Kurpisz – guitar (12)
- Filip Sojka – bass (2–8, 10–12, 14)
- Magda Trybuła, Nadia Bogadżijew, Piotr Nowicki, Andrzej Gębski – strings (7, 10, 12–13)
- Piotr Remiszewski – drums (4, 7–8, 10–11)
- José Torres – percussions (2, 4, 8, 11, 14)
- Janusz Mus – accordion (14)
- Marek Podkowa – saxophone (4, 7, 10–11)
- Michał Urbaniak – saxophone (5)
- Łukasz Golec – trumpet (4, 7)
- Paweł Golec – trombone (4, 7)
- Darek Miller – harmonika (3)
- Kasia Stankiewicz – vocals (6, 11)
- Mietek Szcześniak – vocals (4, 8, 11, 14)
- Agnieszka Betley – backing vocals (2–3, 5, 7–10)
- Magda Gleinert – backing vocals (2–3, 5, 7–10)
- Grzegorz Piwkowski – mastering
- Robert Wolański – photography
- Adah Studio – graphic design

== Charts ==
Chart (1997)	Peak position
Polish Albums	2

== Certifications ==
Region	Certification	Certified units/sales
Poland (ZPAV)	Platinum	200,000
