= Kayah i Bregović =

Studio album by Kayah and Goran Bregović
- Released: 12 April 1999
- Genre: World
- Length: 39:45
- Language: Polish; Romani
- Label: Zic Zac; BMG Poland
- Producer: Goran Bregović; Ognjan Radivojević; Predrag Milanović; Grzegorz Brzozowicz (add.)

Goran Bregović chronology
Silence of the Balkans (1998)	Kayah i Bregović (1999)	Songbook (2000)

Kayah chronology
Zebra (1997)	Kayah i Bregović (1999)	JakaJaKayah (2000)

Professional ratings
Review scores
Source	Rating
AllMusic	4/5 stars
Europopmusic	4/5 stars
Machina	4/5 stars

Kayah i Bregović is a studio album by Bosnian musician Goran Bregović and Polish singer Kayah, released in 1999 by Zic Zac and BMG Poland. The album was a major commercial and critical success in Poland, spawning the hits "Śpij kochanie, śpij" and "Prawy do lewego".

== Background ==
Kayah and Goran Bregović met at an awards gala in 1998 and started working on the album later that year. The project had to be delayed due to Kayah's pregnancy, and the recording process was challenged by seasonal sickness of the artists – Kayah reportedly recorded vocals in 40-degree Celsius fever. The material consists of various songs from Bregović's repertoire to which Kayah wrote Polish lyrics. Musically, it is a blend of Balkan music and Polish folk, including traditional music of the Gorals and references to Polish Christmas carol "Bóg się rodzi", as well as elements of Romani music. The first two singles released from the album, "Śpij kochanie, śpij" and "Prawy do lewego", met with nationwide popularity in Poland and remain one of the biggest hits in Kayah's repertoire. Further two singles, "To nie ptak" and "Nie ma, nie ma ciebie", released later in 1999, achieved moderate success.

The album met with a major commercial and critical success in Poland. It reached number 1 in monthly sales charts published by Gazeta Muzyczna and ZPAV (official Polish album sales chart OLiS did not exist at the time). On the day of its release, the album was certified gold in Poland, and the day after – platinum, for selling over 100,000 copies. By mid-2000, it had sold in excess of 700,000 copies which earned it a diamond certification in Poland. The album was awarded with a Fryderyk for the Pop Album of the Year. It also won the album award in the Machinery '99 contest and the Best Pop Album award at Superjedynki. Following its nationwide success in Poland, BMG decided to distribute the album in a number of European countries.

== Track listing ==
All lyrics are written by Kayah, except where noted; all music is composed by Goran Bregović, except where noted; all tracks are produced by Bregović, Ognjan Radivojević, and Predrag Milanović, and co-produced by Grzegorz Brzozowicz.

No.	Title	Lyrics	Music	Length
1.	"Śpij kochanie, śpij"			4:31
2.	"To nie ptak"			4:40
3.	"100 lat młodej parze"			3:09
4.	"Byłam różą"			3:41
5.	"Trudno kochać"			3:55
6.	"Prawy do lewego"			3:25
7.	"Ta-bakiera"			4:15
8.	"Čaje šukarije"	Marek Kościkiewicz	Romani folk	3:12
9.	"Jeśli Bóg istnieje"			4:53
10.	"Nie ma, nie ma ciebie"			3:49

=== Samples ===
- "Śpij kochanie, śpij" is a cover of "Šta ima novo" (1988), written by Bregović, as performed by Bijelo Dugme.
- "To nie ptak" interpolates "Ako možeš, zaboravi" (1983) and "Da te bogdo ne volim" (1984), both written by Bregović and performed by Bijelo Dugme.
- "100 lat młodej parze" interpolates "Borino oro" (1988), written and performed by Bregović.
- "Byłam różą" is a cover of "Ružica si bila, sada više nisi" (1986), written by Bregović and performed by Bijelo Dugme; which itself was based on the Međimurjan folk song "Rožica sem bila".
- "Trudno kochać" is a cover of "Sve će to, mila moja, prekriti ruzmarin, snjegovi i šaš" (1979), written by Bregović, as performed by Bijelo Dugme.
- "Prawy do lewego" is a cover of a Romani folk song "Duj sandale".
- "Ta-bakiera" is a cover of "Tango" (1989), written and performed by Bregović.
- "Čaje šukarije" is a cover of "Čaje šukarije" (1990), as performed by Zdravko Čolić; which itself interpolates "Čaje šukarije" (1961), written and performed by Esma Redžepova.
- "Jeśli Bóg istnieje" interpolates "Ako ima Boga" (1988), "Te noći kad umrem, kad odem, kad me ne bude" (1986) and "Ne gledaj me tako i ne ljubi me više" (1975), all three written by Bregović and performed by Bijelo Dugme.
- "Nie ma, nie ma ciebie" is a cover of the Romani folk song "Ederlezi".

== Charts ==
Chart (1999–2000)	Peak position
Italian Albums (Musica e dischi)	24
Polish Albums	1

Chart (2015)	Peak position
Polish Albums	6

== Certifications ==
Region	Certification	Certified units/sales
Poland (ZPAV)	Diamond	700,000
