= Maria Peszek =

Polish singer and actress (born 1973)

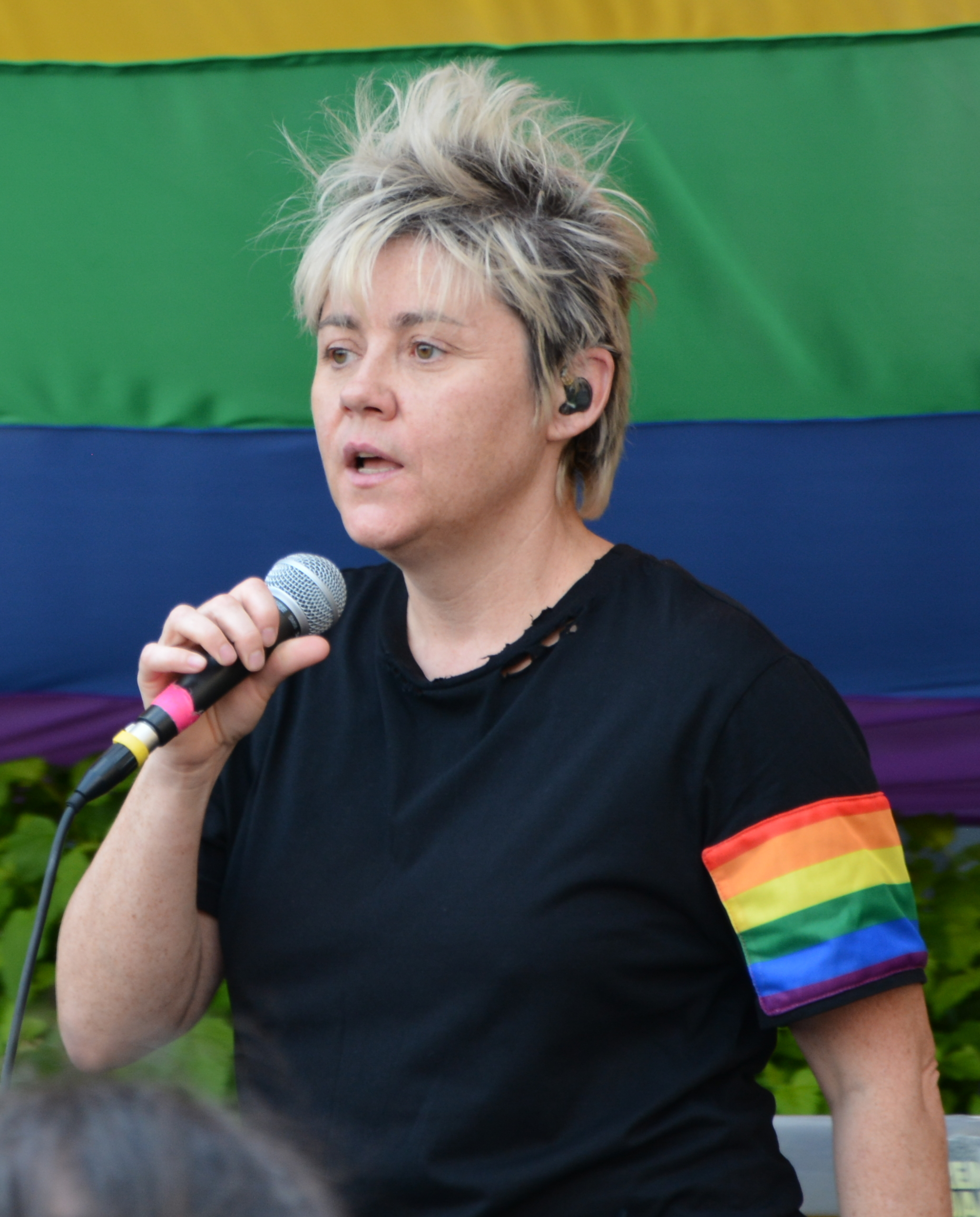
- Maria Peszek performing at the 2021 Warsaw Equality Parade
- Born: 9 September 1973 (age 53); Wrocław, Poland
- Education: AST National Academy of Theatre Arts in Kraków
- Occupations: Singer, songwriter, actress
- Years active: 1993–present
- Father: Jan Peszek
- Musical career
- Genres: Indie pop, alternative rock, shock rock
- Labels: Kayax, Agora, Mystic Production, Warner Music Poland

Maria Teresa Peszek (born 9 September 1973) is a Polish singer and actress. She embarked on a professional acting career in the early 1990s and went on to appear in over 40 stage plays, as well as a number of feature films and television series. In 2005, Peszek released her debut album, the commercially successful and critically acclaimed Miasto mania, followed by Maria Awaria (2008) and Jezus Maria Peszek (2012) which both topped the Polish albums chart and received favourable reviews. Peszek is noted for controversial lyrics and subjects of her work, often revolving around sexuality, politics, social norms and religion.

== Biography ==
Peszek was born in Wrocław, Poland into a family of actors. Having appeared as a child in several theatre and TV productions in the 1980s, she officially debuted in a theatrical adaptation of Sanatorium Under the Sign of the Hourglass in 1995 at the Juliusz Słowacki Theatre in Kraków, where she graduated from an acting school the following year.

Her debut album, Miasto mania, was released in October 2005 by Kayax, an independent label co-founded by Polish singer Kayah. The material on the album drew inspiration from Poland's capital, Warsaw, and served as a musical background to a multi-media theatre play of the same title which premiered simultaneously. It spawned the popular lead single "Moje miasto" and was a critical and commercial success, eventually reaching platinum certification for selling in over 30,000 copies. In 2006, Peszek won the Fryderyk award for the Best New Act and released an extended play Mania siku which consisted of live recordings and new songs.

September 2008 saw the release of her next album, entitled Maria Awaria, promoted by the songs "Ciało" and "Rosół". The album explicitly dealt with the concept of human sexuality and caused many controversies, especially in the conservative right wing media. Nonetheless, it gathered numerous flattering reviews and became her first number 1 album in the Polish albums chart. It was certified platinum in less than a month and won the Paszport Polityki award in 2009. Peszek embarked on a long tour to support the album, which continued with breaks into late 2010. In 2011 she contributed a theme song to a controversial Polish film Z miłości.

Peszek's third studio album, Jezus Maria Peszek, was released in October 2012 through Mystic Production, preceded by the single "Ludzie psy". Prior to recording the album, Peszek had suffered from nervous breakdown which was widely discussed across Polish media and reflected in the album's lyrics. The album was a criticism towards organized religion, patriotism and social norms which caused further controversies. It was another major success, gathering highly flattering reviews, debuting atop Polish albums chart and eventually receiving platinum certification. Peszek toured internationally to promote the album, performing concerts in Poland, England, Ireland and Czech Republic, which resulted in the live release JEZUS is aLIVE (2014).

Her fourth album, Karabin, was released in February 2016 by Warner Music Poland and explored such topics as freedom, hate speech and individualism. It spawned the popular lead single "Polska A B C i D" and the controversial "Modern Holocaust". Although it did not match the critical success of its predecessors, it went gold in Poland in just over a month. To promote the album, Peszek again toured in Poland, Ireland, England and Czech Republic. In October 2017, Peszek released the single "Ophelia" recorded for her brother's stage adaptation of Hamlet.

Peszek began working on new material during the COVID-19 pandemic. In June 2021, she released "Virunga", a song dedicated to the Polish LGBT community, which she performed live at the 2021 Warsaw Equality Parade. Her fifth studio album, titled Ave Maria, was released in September 2021 and apart from advocating the rights of women and sexual minorities, it criticised Poland's conservative politics and child sexual abuse in the Catholic Church. The album debuted atop the Polish album sales chart. In 2022, she toured in Poland in support of the album, starred in a popular Polish Netflix series Królowa, and released the autobiographical book Naku*wiam zen in collaboration with her father, Jan Peszek.

== Personal life ==
She has been in a relationship with her partner, Edward, since 1992. She is an atheist. Peszek has expressed support for Polish politician Robert Biedroń.

== Discography ==
=== Studio albums ===
Title	Album details	Peak chart positions	Sales	Certifications
Title	Album details	POL	Sales	Certifications
Miasto mania	Released: 14 October 2005; Label: Kayax; Formats: CD, digital download	6	POL: 40,000+	POL: Platinum
Maria Awaria	Released: 22 September 2008; Label: Kayax; Formats: CD, digital download	1	POL: 60,000+	POL: 2 × Platinum
Jezus Maria Peszek	Released: 3 October 2012; Label: Mystic Production; Formats: CD, LP, digital download	1	POL: 30,000+	POL: Platinum
Karabin	Released: 26 February 2016; Label: Warner Music Poland; Formats: CD, LP, digital download	2	POL: 30,000+	POL: Platinum
Ave Maria	Released: 10 September 2021; Label: Mystic Production; Formats: CD, LP, digital download	1		
"—" denotes a recording that did not chart or was not released in that territory.

=== Live albums ===
Title	Album details	Peak chart positions
Title	Album details	POL
Najmniejszy koncert świata	Released: 2010; Label: Agora; Formats: digital download	—
JEZUS is aLIVE	Released: 14 February 2014; Label: Mystic Production; Formats: CD, digital download	4
"—" denotes a recording that did not chart or was not released in that territory.

=== Singles ===
Year	Title	Album
2005	"Moje miasto"	Miasto mania
2006	"Nie mam czasu na seks"	Miasto mania
2006	"Miły mój"	Miasto mania
2008	"Ciało"	Maria Awaria
2008	"Rosół"	Maria Awaria
2009	"Muchomory"	Maria Awaria
2011	"Znajdziesz mnie znowu"	—N/a
2012	"Padam"	Jezus Maria Peszek
2012	"Ludzie psy"	Jezus Maria Peszek
2013	"Sorry Polsko"	Jezus Maria Peszek
2013	"Pan nie jest moim pasterzem"	Jezus Maria Peszek
2014	"Wyścigówka"	JEZUS is aLIVE
2016	"Polska A B C i D"	Karabin
2016	"Modern Holocaust"	Karabin
2016	"Samotny tata"	Karabin
2016	"Ej Maria"	Karabin
2017	"Ophelia"	—N/a
2021	"Virunga"	Ave Maria
2021	"Ave Maria"	Ave Maria
2021	"J*bię to wszystko"	Ave Maria
2021	"Barbarka" (feat. Oskar83)	Ave Maria

== Filmography ==
=== Feature films ===
- 1993: Schindler's List
- 1995: Spis cudzołożnic
- 1997: Nocne graffiti
- 2001: The Hexer
- 2002: Julie Walking Home
- 2004: Ubu Król
- 2008: 0 1 0
- 2018: Nina

=== TV series ===
- 1984: Rozalka Olaboga – as Aldzia Kłos
- 2000: Na dobre i na złe – as Anna Radwańska
- 2000–2001: Miasteczko – as Mariola Zbyś
- 2002: Wiedźmin – as Iola
- 2003: Magiczne drzewo – as Jacek's mother
- 2005: Boża podszewka II – as Stasia
- 2022: Queen - as Wiola

== Books ==
- 2008: Maria Awaria. Bezwstydnik
- 2022: Naku*wiam zen
