= Transoriental Orchestra =

Studio album by Kayah
- Released: 5 November 2013
- Recorded: March–August 2013
- Genre: World
- Length: 1:01:36
- Language: Polish; Hebrew; Ladino; Yiddish; Arabic; Macedonian; Romani
- Label: Kayax
- Producer: Atanas Valkov

Kayah chronology
Panienki z temperamentem (2010)	Transoriental Orchestra (2013)	Gdy pada śnieg (2016)

Professional ratings
Review scores
Source	Rating
Europopmusic	3.5/5 stars

Transoriental Orchestra is a studio album by Polish singer Kayah, released in 2013 by Kayax.

== Background ==
The album was inspired by Kayah's performance at the 9th Festival of Jewish Culture in Warsaw in 2012, during which she presented traditional Sephardi and Ashkenazi Jewish songs from different regions of Europe and the Middle East, performed in a range of languages. She collaborated with Bulgarian composer Atanas Valkov and various musicians of Polish, Ukrainian and Persian origins, with whom she went on to record the songs for an album. It was released on Kayah's birthday in 2013. Disc 2 includes first three songs recorded with Polish lyrics written by Kayah, a remix of "El Eliyahu", and "Kicy bidy i bokha", de facto not a Jewish song, which promoted the film Papusza. The album was supported by the songs "Rebeka", serviced to Polish radio as a single, and "Kondja Mia, Kondja Mia", accompanied by a music video filmed in Tel Aviv. Kayah went on to tour the material in Poland, Israel and Spain, among others.

Transoriental Orchestra received favourable reviews and was nominated to the Fryderyk award for the Album of the Year. In 2014, it was certified platinum in Poland for selling over 30,000 copies.

== Track listing ==
CD 1

1. "Kondja Mia, Kondja Mia" – 3:19
2. "Aman Minush" – 4:47
3. "De Edad de Kinze Anyos" – 5:10
4. "Lamma Bada" – 3:39
5. "Hava Nagila" – 2:27
6. "El Eliyahu" – 3:37
7. "Transoriental" – 3:15
8. "Ajde Jano" – 5:17
9. "Rebeka" – 4:42
10. "Jidisze Mame" – 3:48
11. "Warszawo ma" – 2:04

CD 2

1. "Muszlo moja" – 3:19
2. "Nie ma mnie już i cóż" – 4:44
3. "Nie ma dat" – 5:09
4. "El Eliyahu" (Remix) – 3:34
5. "Kicy bidy i bokha" – 2:52

== Charts ==
Chart (2013)	Peak position
Polish Albums (ZPAV)	47

== Certifications ==
Region	Certification	Certified units/sales
Poland (ZPAV)	Platinum	30,000^{*}
^{*} Sales figures based on certification alone.
