= JakaJaKayah =

Studio album by Kayah
- Released: 12 May 2000
- Genre: Pop; soul; world; electronica
- Length: 76:08 (international edition)
- Language: Polish; English; Portuguese
- Label: Zic Zac; BMG Poland
- Producer: Kayah; Krzysztof Pszona

Kayah chronology
Kayah i Bregović (1999)	JakaJaKayah (2000)	Stereo typ (2003)

Professional ratings
Review scores
Source	Rating
Codzienna Gazeta Muzyczna	4/5 stars
Europopmusic	4/5 stars
Machina	3.5/5 stars

JakaJaKayah is the fourth studio album by Polish singer Kayah, released in 2000 by Zic Zac and BMG Poland.

== Background ==
The album was almost entirely written by Kayah (excluding two poems by Polish poets Maria Pawlikowska-Jasnorzewska and Jan Twardowski used in tracks "Topielice" and "Kiedy mówisz", respectively). Musically, it incorporates elements of pop, soul, world and electronic music. The album's lead single "JakaJaKayah" met with considerable success, reaching the top 10 of the airplay chart in Poland. "Anioł wiedział" and "Topielice" followed as singles later in 2000, but did not achieve commercial success. In 2001, a special edition of the album was released, including the new single "Embarcação" recorded in Portuguese with Cape Verdean singer Cesária Évora. The album was then released internationally as YakaYaKayah with some of the songs recorded in English.

JakaJaKayah received favourable reviews and got a nomination to the Fryderyk award for Best Pop Album. Official Polish album sales chart OLiS did not exist at the time, but the album reached number 4 in the reliable monthly sales chart published by Gazeta Muzyczna. The album was certified platinum in Poland in 2003 for selling over 100,000 copies.

== Track listing ==
Standard edition

CD 1

1. "Nie patrzysz" – 7:38
2. "Zulus" – 0:12
3. "Anioł wiedział" – 3:40
4. "Za blisko" – 3:49
5. "Dla niego" – 2:45
6. "Jaka ja Kayah" – 4:53
7. "Na wieki" – 4:09
8. "Nie wiedziałam (O synku)" – 5:54
9. "Wbrew naturze" – 3:55
10. "Kiedy mówisz" – 4:21
11. "A tymczasem na zapleczu" – 0:15
12. "Topielice" – 3:45
13. "James Blond 4 Gut By" – 3:56

CD 2

1. "Jaka ja Kayah" (Smolik Mix) – 7:12
2. "Anioł wiedział" (Smolik Mix) – 6:00
3. "Jaka ja Kayah" (Wersja instrumentalna) – 3:50

Prezentacja multimedialna

International edition

1. "Nie patrzysz" – 7:38
2. "Zulus" – 0:12
3. "Anioł wiedział" – 3:40
4. "Za blisko" – 3:49
5. "Dla niego" – 2:45
6. "Jaka ja Kayah" – 4:53
7. "Na wieki" – 4:09
8. "Nie wiedziałam" – 5:54
9. "Wbrew naturze" – 3:55
10. "Kiedy mówisz" – 4:21
11. "A tymczasem na zapleczu" – 0:15
12. "Topielice" – 3:45
13. "James Blond 4 Gut By" – 3:56
14. "Embarcação" (Radio Edit) (feat. Cesária Évora) – 3:26
15. "Holy Angel" ("Anioł wiedział") – 3:39
16. "Too Close" ("Za blisko") – 3:49
17. "All the Same" ("Dla niego") – 3:40
18. "For My Son" ("Nie wiedziałam") – 5:54
19. "YakaYaKayah" (Smolik Mix) – 7:12

== Charts ==
Chart (2000)	Peak position
Polish Albums	4

== Certifications ==
Region	Certification	Certified units/sales
Poland (ZPAV)	Platinum	100,000
