= Man from Reno =

Man from Reno may refer to:

- "Man from Reno" (song), a 1993 song by Goran Bregović and Scott Walker for the French film Toxic Affair
- Man from Reno (film), a 2014 American film directed by Dave Boyle
