= The Best & the Rest =

Compilation album by Kayah
- Released: 29 April 2005
- Genre: Pop; soul; world
- Length: 1:59:04
- Language: Polish; Portuguese; Romani; English
- Label: Sony BMG Music Entertainment Poland

Kayah chronology
Stereo typ (2003)	The Best & the Rest (2005)	MTV Unplugged (2007)

The Best & the Rest is a greatest hits compilation by Polish singer Kayah, released in 2005 by Sony BMG Music Entertainment Poland.

== Background ==
The retrospective collects all of Kayah's biggest hits on disc 1, including a new song, "Jutro rano", and re-recordings of "Na językach" and her debut 1988 single "Córeczko". Disc 2 consists mainly of songs recorded for various projects, previously not available on any Kayah album, and remixes. The Best & the Rest was the singer's final album released under contract with Sony BMG. "Jutro rano" was released as a single and became a radio hit in Poland. The album debuted atop Polish album sales chart and held the position for three consecutive weeks. It was certified gold in Poland.

== Track listing ==
CD 1 – The Best

1. "Jutro rano" (feat. Smolik) – 3:10
2. "Prócz ciebie, nic" (feat. Krzysztof Kiljański) – 3:36
3. "Do D.N.A." – 4:32
4. "Testosteron" – 3:07
5. "Embarcação" (feat. Cesária Évora) – 3:26
6. "Anioł wiedział" – 3:40
7. "Jaka ja Kayah" – 4:53
8. "Nie ma, nie ma ciebie" (feat. Goran Bregović) – 3:49
9. "To nie ptak" (feat. Goran Bregović) – 4:40
10. "Prawy do lewego" (feat. Goran Bregović) – 3:25
11. "Śpij kochanie, śpij" (feat. Goran Bregović) – 4:31
12. "Supermenka" – 3:36
13. "Na językach" – 4:48
14. "Fleciki" – 5:02
15. "Santana" – 4:40
16. "Córeczko" – 2:58

CD 2 – The Rest

1. "Wybacz kochanie" – 2:23
2. "Jestem zła" – 3:12
3. "Życie jest darem" – 4:47
4. "Najpiękniejsi" (feat. Poluzjanci) – 3:57
5. "Wiosna przyjdzie i tak" – 3:14
6. "Testosteron" (Orkiestra Mix) – 3:16
7. "Uwierz... to nie ja" (feat. Urszula) – 4:16
8. "Jaka ja Kayah" (Smolik Mix) – 7:14
9. "Anioł wiedział" (Smolik Mix) – 6:04
10. "Miłość ci wszystko wybaczy" (feat. Goran Bregović) – 2:50
11. "Dobry potwór nie jest zły" (feat. Roch) – 2:43
12. "Duchy tych co mieszkali tu" – 3:23
13. "Hit" (feat. Michał Urbaniak and Rejs) – 3:58
14. "Amen" (feat. Věra Bílá and Chico & the Gypsies) – 3:10

== Charts ==
Chart (2005)	Peak position
Polish Albums (OLiS)	1

== Certifications ==
Region	Certification	Certified units/sales
Poland (ZPAV)	Gold	35,000
