= Megitza =

Polish singer, double bass player, and composer

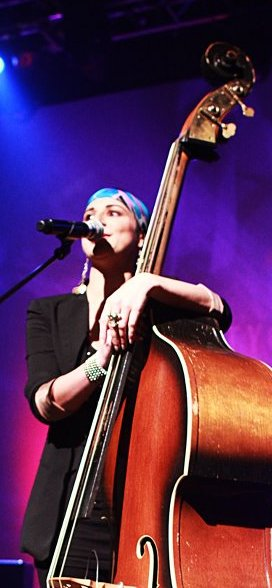
- Megitza at the Copernicus Theater in Chicago, 2012

Background information
- Born: Małgorzata Babiarz; November 27, 1984 (age 41); Zakopane, Poland
- Origin: Poland
- Genres: Eastern European and Balkan folk, romani music, gypsy jazz, Latin music, world music, pop, worldbeat, Americana
- Occupations: singer, bassist, composer, producer
- Instruments: Vocals, upright bass
- Years active: 2008–present
- Label: Warner Music Poland
- Website: www.megitza.com

Małgorzata Babiarz, professionally known as Megitza, (born November 27, 1984, in Zakopane) is a Polish singer, double bass player, and composer. She combines Polish and Eastern European folk music, Romani music and gypsy jazz with world music, Latin music, pop, worldbeat, Americana and reggae.

In 2001, Megitza emigrated to Chicago, where she appeared in charity concerts and events such as Great Orchestra of Christmas Charity and where she promoted Polish culture. She began her professional career in 2008, when she formed the Megitza Quartet and released her debut album, Boleritza. She has since performed at the Milwaukee Avenue Arts Festival at the Jay Pritzker Pavilion, the 13th All Souls Jazz festival at the Chopin Theatre, the Chicago World Music Festival, and the Old Town School of Folk Music in Chicago. The Chicago Sun-Times has noted the quartet's "energetic" performances. According to the Chicago Tribune she and the group are primarily influenced by Eastern European folk, gypsy, Polish, and Greek music. Songs include "Boleritza", "Mamo te Mera", "Cisza", "17_14", and "What I Desire".

== Biography ==
Megitza was born on November 27, 1984, in Zakopane, Poland. In 2001, she migrated to Chicago, where she has continued the cultivation of her Polish heritage, but also experimented with world music and gypsy music of Eastern Europe and Latin music. In 2003, Megitza was appointed the queen of the Polish Highlanders Alliance of North America. She organized a charity event, and proceeds were donated to orphanages in Poland. As a musician, Megitza has participated in charity concerts and events such as Great Orchestra of Christmas Charity. In 2004, Megitza received the highest score (126) at the Polish National intelligence quotient (IQ) contest in Chicago. She promotes the culture of Poland and Podhale in Chicago and the United States.

Megitza is a self-taught vocalist and bass player. She began her career in 2008, when she formed the Megitza Quartet. The band is currently composed of Megitza on vocals and upright bass, Andreas Kapsalis on acoustic guitar, Marek Lichota on bayan (accordion), and Jamie Gallagher on drums and percussion. The Megitza Quartet is known for its high energy stage presence, and the quartet has been compared to artists such as Gypsy Kings, Ewa Demarczyk, Goran Bregović, Kayah and Lura. In 2008, Megitza released her debut album, Boleritza. The album includes traditional and original compositions. Roby Lakatos is a guest violinist on Boleritza, on two tracks: "Mamo Temera" and "17_14".

Her original compositions are primarily influenced by folk music of Polish highlanders (gorals of Podhale), Romani music, Balkan folk and World music. The Chicago Tribune notes Eastern European folk and "gypsy, Greek, and Polish influences". Notable songs include "Boleritza", "Mamo te Mera", "Cisza" and "17_14".

== Performances and reception ==
Megitza is regarded as an influential artist representing Poles abroad. She has made hundreds of concerts and appearances at major festivals in America, especially in Chicago, including the Old Town School of Folk Music in August 2009, the Lotus World Music and Arts Festival in September 2009, the Milwaukee Avenue Arts Festival at the Jay Pritzker Pavilion in March 2010, at the lakefront in Dawes Park in July 2010, the Chicago World Music Festival (an event presented by the Chicago Department of Cultural Affairs and Special Events (DCASE), in partnership with the Chicago Office of Tourism and Culture (COTC) ), in September 2011, the Chicago Folk and Roots Festival in July 2011, the Chicago Summer Dance Festival, and Taste of Chicago, all in her adopted city. They also performed at the All Souls Jazz festival held at the Chopin Theatre of Chicago in November 2010, an event which Howard Reich of the Chicago Tribune said "Chicago's All Souls fest looks, feels and sounds like no other jazz soiree in this city". In July 2009 they performed the Slovak Roma wedding song "Mamko Moja" live on ABC7's "Chicagoing" with Bill Campbell. Time Out Chicago described her as a "fiery" singer and the band's music as "energetic Roma folk" when they performed at "Women's Global Voices" with the likes of Ugochi and The Afro Soul Ensemble in March 2012, a concert presented by Sound Culture honoring Women's History Month." The Chicago Sun-Times has also noted the "energetic" performances of the quartet.

The Sound Culture Center for Global Arts described Megitza as "a true concert revelation – an unusual voice, charisma and beauty", describing her music as "dynamic, vibrant, full of energy, uniting listeners of all ages." Jazz Chicago said of the 2008 album, "Throughout, Babariaz's strong vocals engage the senses, while Lichota's romantic accordion is a treat as well. The blend of traditional folk music and originals are played and sung very well and make for an intriguing visit to the Old World." Although Megitza mainly performs in the United States, in July 2012 she performed at the Jazz Fest Wien in Vienna, Austria, and the Montreux Jazz Festival in Montreux, Switzerland, before performing extensively in Poland.

In Poland, the Megitza Quartet reached the finals of the fifth edition of Must Be the Music, and in 2015 the Megitza Trio entered the eighth season of Mam talent!, the Polish version of Got Talent, earning a "golden key" to advance directly to the semi-finals.

== Discography ==
=== Studio albums ===
Title	Album details
Boleritza	Released: November 30, 2008; Label: Megitza; Formats: CD, digital download
Legenda	Released: July 1, 2012; Label: Megitza; Formats: CD, digital download
Megitza	Released: July 1, 2012; Label: Megitza; Formats: CD, digital download
Dobra Nowina (Good Message) with Renata Przemyk	Released: December 22, 2012; Label: Megitza; Formats: CD, digital download
Mak with Andreas Kapsalis	Released: October 2013; Label: Megitza; Formats: CD

=== Music videos ===
Title	Year	Directed	Album
"What I Desire"	2011	Ewa Uszpolewicz	Megitza
"Beauty Rumelaj"	2012	Maciej Michalski	Megitza
"Suspicious"	2012	Rafał Kawalec	Megitza
"Jezus Malusieńki" with Renata Przemyk	2012	Maciej Michalski	Dobra Nowina (Good Message)
"Teroz"	2014	Maciej Michalski, Piotr Smoleński	—
