= Maria Awaria =

Studio album by Maria Peszek
- Released: 19 September 2008
- Genre: Alternative pop
- Length: 46:34
- Language: Polish
- Label: Kayax
- Producer: Andrzej Smolik, Jan Smoczyński, Michał "Fox" Król

Maria Peszek chronology
Miasto mania (2005)	Maria Awaria (2008)	Jezus Maria Peszek (2012)

Maria Awaria is the second studio album by Polish singer Maria Peszek, released in 2008 by Kayax. Majority of the material was composed and produced by Andrzej Smolik and most of the lyrics were written by Peszek herself. The album explored the subject of human sexuality which caused controversies in Poland, especially in the conservative right wing media. Nonetheless, it met with generally favourable reviews and became her first number 1 album. It was certified platinum in less than a month and won the Paszport Polityki award in 2009. Peszek toured the album from autumn 2008 into late 2010.

== Track listing ==
1. "Miś" – 3:33 ("Teddy Bear")
2. "Kobiety pistolety" – 4:53 ("Pistol Women")
3. "Marznę bez ciebie" – 3:28 ("I'm Freezing Without You")
4. "Rosół" – 2:39 ("Chicken Soup")
5. "Miłość w systemie Dolby Surround" – 3:49 ("Love in the Dolby Surround Sound System")
6. "Reks" – 0:27 ("Rex")
7. "Hujawiak" – 3:29 (a pun; "chuj" is a vulgar word for penis, Kujawiak is a Polish folk dance)
8. "Maria Awaria" – 3:40 ("Faulty Mary")
9. "Superglue" – 2:26
10. "Ciało" – 4:01 ("Body")
11. "Rozpuda" – 3:28
12. "Hedonia" – 3:57
13. "Ładne słowa to" – 3:03 ("Nice Words Are...")
14. "Muchomory" – 3:47 ("Toadstools")

== Singles ==
- 2008: "Ciało"
- 2008: "Rosół"
- 2009: "Muchomory"

== Commercial performance ==
Chart (2008)	Peak position	Certification	Sales
Poland	1	2 × Platinum	55,000
