= Chesney Snow =

American actor

- Born: Chesney Snow; 1979 (age 46–47); Oklahoma, United States
- Occupations: Musician, producer
- Children: 1

Chesney Snow (born 1979) is an American stage actor, musician, songwriter, beat-boxer, and educator. He is known for appearing in the role of Boxman in the Primary Stages' production of the a cappella musical In Transit. He reprised his role as Boxman in the first Broadway run of In Transit. He is currently a Lecturer in Residence at Princeton University.

== Professional background ==
In 2005, Snow appeared as a special guest on Kayah's MTV Unplugged album which peaked at #4 on the Polish music charts and eventually became a certified gold record.

In 2009 Snow was featured on the official remix of Asher Roth's platinum selling debut single "I Love College" produced by J. Cardim for SRC Universal.

Snow is also the executive producer and feature of the documentary film American Beatboxer. He co-founded the American Beatbox Championships in 2010.

In Transit's Off-Broadway production went on to receive multiple New York theatre award nominations including Drama Desk, Lucille Lortel, Outer Critics Circle, and Drama League. In Transit was the most nominated Off-Broadway musical of the 2010-2011 New York theatre season. The ensemble cast of the 2010 Primary Stages' production of In Transit received the Drama Desk award for Outstanding Ensemble Performance, of which Snow was a member.

In 2011 Snow was a featured artist and participant of the World Science Festival's BioRhythm - Music and the Body exhibit presented by the Sonic Arts Research Center of Queens University in Northern Ireland. (SARC)

Chesney collaborated with Polish band Łąki Łan as a lyricist on their 2012 album Armanda (EMI Music Poland). Chesney wrote lyrics for "Łan for Me", "Infinite", "Sundown", and "Armanda". The album debuted at #44 on the Polish music charts.

In 2014 Chesney collaborated with one of Poland's most popular singers Edyta Górniak writing the lyrics for her 2014 song "Your High" which became a bestselling digital download on several Polish music portals including I-Tunes in Poland. The song topped the 2014 charts of one of Poland's largest radio networks Radio Zet.

He is a member of the musical group Spoken Love which released their debut album Spoken Love on Warner Music Poland.

Snow was the executive producer and curator of the American Beatbox Championships for 6 years, an annual music festival held in New York City which presents showcases and competitions centered on the art of beatboxing.
