= Atom String Quartet =

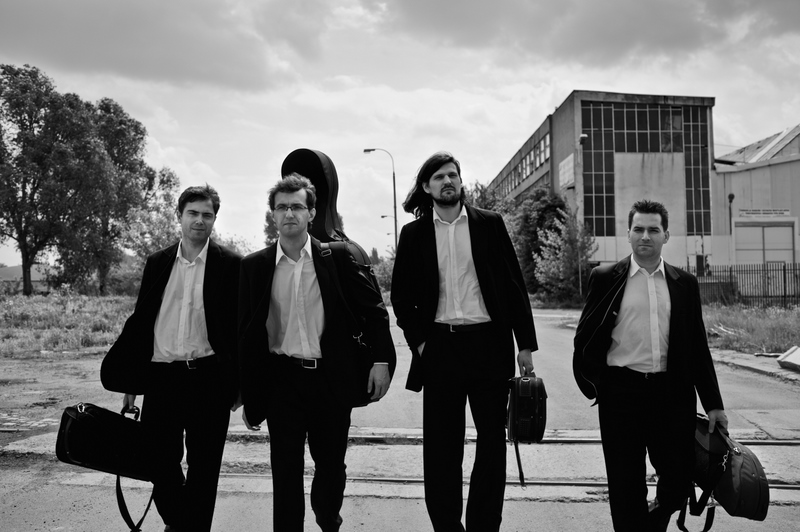

Background information
- Origin: Warsaw, Poland
- Genres: Jazz
- Occupation: Chamber ensemble
- Years active: 2010–present
- Label: Kayax
- Members: Dawid Lubowicz, Mateusz Smoczyński, Michał Zaborski, Krzysztof Lenczowski
- Website: www.atomstringquartet.com

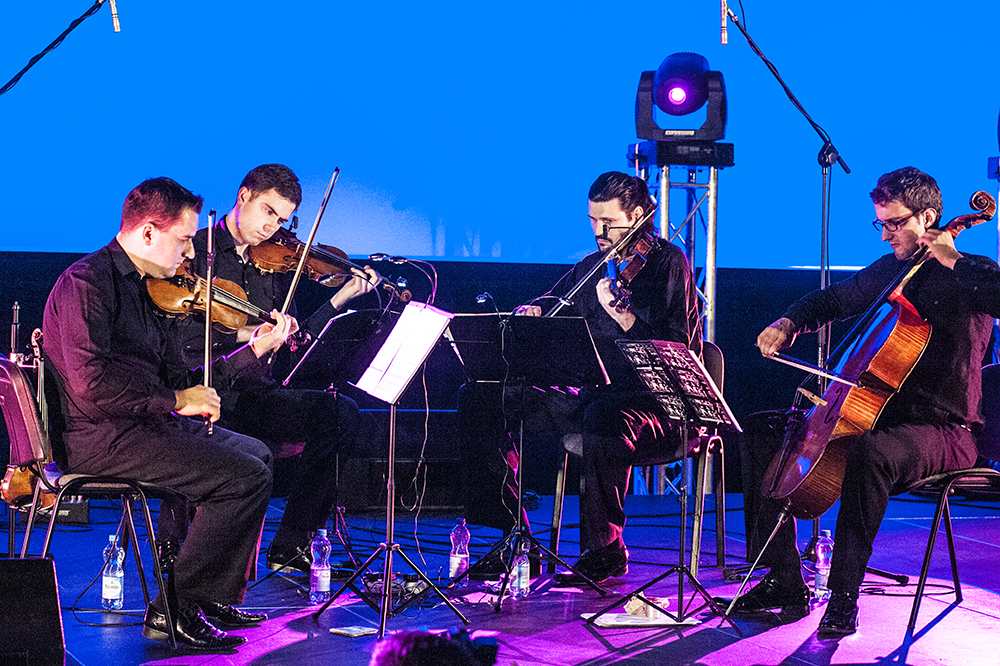
Polish string quartet The Atom String Quartet performing in Warsaw, at the Fre3Jazzdays Festival, August 2012

Atom String Quartet is a string quartet that specializes in jazz, and is the first such band in Poland. In June 2011 the quartet’s album “Fade in” was released, which was a live concert that was recorded on Radio Katowice. It received a “Fryderyk” in “Jazz debut” category.

== Current members ==
- Dawid Lubowicz - violin
- Mateusz Smoczyński - violin
- Michal Zaborski - viola
- Krzysztof Lenczowski - cello

== Discography ==
- Fade In (Polskie Radio Katowice - 2011)
- Fade In (Kayax - 2012)
- Places (Kayax - 2012)
- Universum (Warner Classics)

== Video recordings ==
- Atom String Quartet Live in Skwer (TVP Kultura - 2010)

== Awards ==
Year	Award	Category
2011	Scholarship founded by the Polish Ministry of Culture	Mloda Polska
2011	Bielska Zadymka Jazzowa	Grand prix
2011	Grand Prix Jazz Melomani	New hope of 2010
2012	Fryderyki	Jazz debut
2012	Folk Music Competition of the Polish Radio „New Tradition”	Zlote Gesle
