= Miasto mania =

Studio album by Maria Peszek
- Released: 14 October 2005
- Genre: Alternative pop
- Length: 52:40
- Language: Polish
- Label: Kayax
- Producers: Wojciech Waglewski, Emade

Maria Peszek chronology
Miasto mania (2005)	Maria Awaria (2008)

Miasto mania is the debut studio album by Polish singer Maria Peszek, released in 2005 by Kayax. Thematically, it was a homage to Poland's capital, Warsaw, and served as a musical background to a multi-media theatre play of the same title which premiered simultaneously. All songs were co-written by Peszek and composed by Wojciech Waglewski and Emade who also produced the album. Miasto mania spawned the popular lead single "Moje miasto" and was a critical and commercial success, eventually earning platinum certification for selling in over 40,000 copies in Poland.

== Track listing ==
1. "Moje miasto" – 4:43 ("My City")
2. "Ćmy" – 2:54 ("Moths")
3. "Mam kota" – 2:53 ("I Have a Cat")
4. "SMS" – 4:59
5. "Ballada nie lada" – 2:54 ("What a Ballad")
6. "Pieprzę cię miasto" – 4:07 ("Screw You, City")
7. "Czarny worek" – 3:34 ("Black Sack")
8. "Lali lali" – 5:30
9. "Mgła" – 3:31 ("Fog")
10. "Nie mam czasu na seks" – 4:06 ("I Don't Have Time for Sex")
11. "Miły mój" – 3:16 ("My Beloved")

== Singles ==
- 2005: "Moje miasto"
- 2006: "Nie mam czasu na seks"
- 2006: "Miły mój"

== Commercial performance ==
Chart (2005)	Peak position	Certification	Sales
Poland	6	Platinum	40,000
