= MTV Unplugged (Kayah album) =

Live album by Kayah
- Released: 23 March 2007
- Recorded: 28 November 2006
- Genre: Pop; soul
- Length: 56:55
- Language: Polish; English
- Label: Kayax
- Producer: Krzysztof Pszona

Kayah chronology
The Best & the Rest (2005)	MTV Unplugged (2007)	Skała (2009)

Professional ratings
Review scores
Source	Rating
Europopmusic	3/5 stars

MTV Unplugged is a live album by Polish singer Kayah, released in 2007 by Kayax.

== Background ==
The album was Kayah's first release on her own record label Kayax, and also the first MTV Unplugged album in East-Central Europe. The material was recorded live at an intimate concert for just over 200 people on 28 November 2006 in Łódź, Poland, featuring guest appearances by Polish pop-jazz singer Anna Maria Jopek and American beatboxer Chesney Snow. The performance aired on MTV Polska on 21 December 2006 and was subsequently released on CD and DVD, the latter including two more tracks, an interview with Kayah, and making-of footage. The album reached number 4 on the Polish sales chart and was certified gold for selling 15,000 copies. The DVD was also certified gold for sales exceeding 5,000 items.

== Track listing ==
1. "Lśnię" – 2:03
2. "Co ich to obchodzi" – 2:01
3. "Nie wiedziałam" – 5:33
4. "Santana" – 5:20
5. "Dzielę na pół" – 6:45
6. "Trudno kochać" – 3:58
7. "Jestem kamieniem" – 3:41
8. "Testosteron" – 3:59
9. "Na językach" (feat. Chesney Snow) – 5:48
10. "Get Down on It" – 4:56
11. "Kiedy mówisz" (feat. Anna Maria Jopek) – 4:48
12. "Wszystko się skończyło" – 7:58

== Charts ==
Chart (2007)	Peak position
Polish Albums (OLiS)	4

== Certifications ==
Region	Certification	Certified units/sales
Poland (ZPAV)	Gold	15,000
