= Mery Spolsky =

Polish musical artist

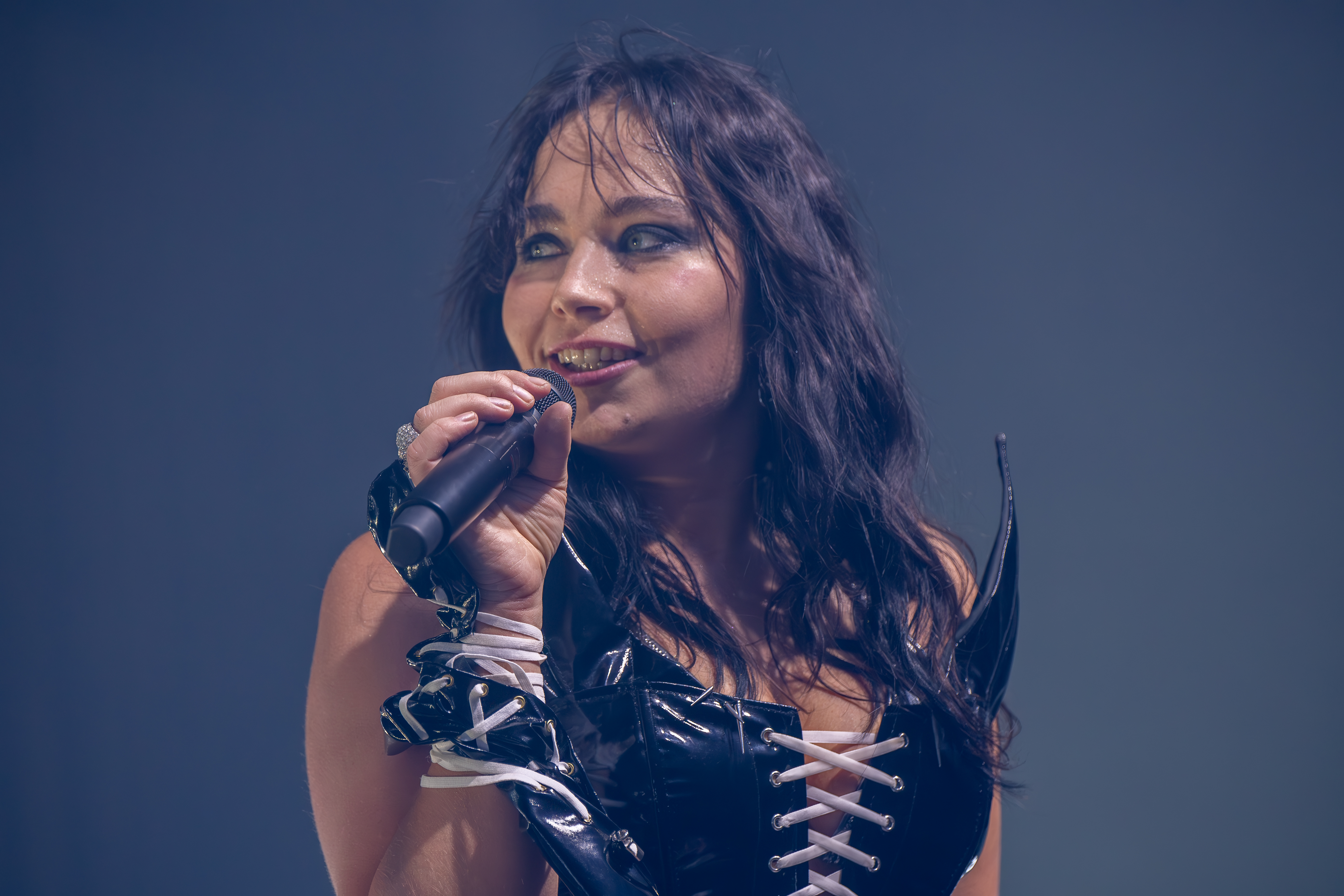
- Mery Spolsky during a concert in Gdańsk (2023)

Background information
- Born: Maria Żak; 14 November 1993 (age 32); Warsaw, Poland
- Genres: pop, rock
- Label: Kayax

Maria Ewa Żak (born 14 November 1993), known as Mery Spolsky, is a Polish singer, songwriter, composer, music producer and clothing designer.

== Life ==
=== Family and education ===
She is a daughter of Ewa and Arkadiusz Żak. At the age of 14, she began learning to play the guitar, which she received from her father.

She graduated from the Frederic Chopin State Primary and Secondary Music School No. 2 in Warsaw in violin class. She attended the Machulski Theatre Club. She studied English studies and American studies at Warsaw University and screenwriting at Warsaw Film School.

=== Music career ===
Her first band, with which she began performing on larger stages, was the psychedelic Makijaż. Later, together with Kuba Bąkała, she formed the duo Różowe Okulary; the compositions of this project were closer to pop music.

Since 2014 she has been working under the pseudonym Mery Spolsky. She performed at the Grechuta Festival, where she presented her own interpretation of the song "Śpij, bajki śnij", for which she received the second prize. In March 2015 she performed at the 36th Review of Actor Songs in Wroclaw, where she won an honorable mention for her performance of her own song "Imperium moich czarnych brwi" and her interpretation of the song "Kiedy mnie już nie będzie" with lyrics by Agnieszka Osiecka. On 12 June, she performed with the song "Cała jesteś w skowronkach" in the "Debuts" concert during the 52nd National Festival of Polish Songs in Opole, where she won an award for the best debut from Stowarzyszenie Artystów Wykonawców Utworów Muzycznych i Muzyczno-słownych (also called SAWP). In October she won the main award and the audience award during the Pejzaż bez Ciebie festival, where she performed her own interpretation of Marek Grechuta's song "W dzikie wino zaplątani". In the poll "Przebój roku 2015" of radio TOK FM, she took the 1st place with the song "Kiedy mnie już nie będzie" (cover of a song by Seweryn Krajewski).

In 2016 she took 1st place at the Carpathia festival in Rzeszów, and received awards in the categories: "best composition" and "most interesting stage personality". A few months later, she won 2nd place at the Young Talent Festival in Szczecin and signed a contract with the Kayax label. At the end of the year, she made a guest appearance on the song "Romantyczna miłość" by rapper Vixen. In June 2017, she released her debut single "Miło było pana poznać", for which she released an official music video. The song became the "Hit of the Year" in Radio Kampus' "Same Shtos 2017" poll. On 15 September she premiered her debut studio album, Miło było pana poznać, which was released on the Kayax label. Shortly before the release of the album, she released her second single, "Alarm", for which the video was recorded in Tokyo. On 8 March 2018 the music video for the final single promoting the album, "Liczydło", was released. The album earned her two nominations for the Fryderyk Award in the categories "phonographic debut of the year" and "electronica album of the year". She performed as part of the Sofar Sounds Warsaw series, during which she presented, among others, a new version of the song "Miło było pana poznać".

On 7 June 2019, she released the single "Fak", which is the first song from her second studio album, Dekalog Spolsky. The album reached number 15 on the top fifty best-selling albums list in Poland. The song "Bigotka" was premiered in September. In January 2020, for the album she received a nomination to the Fryderyk Award in the category "album of the year electronics". In May, she participated in the #hot16challenge2 campaign to promote fundraising for medical personnel working during the COVID-19 pandemic. In September, she released a song recorded with Kayah, "Królestwo kobiet", referring to the TVN series of the same title. In November she sang the song "Sorry from the Mountain" in the finale of the 9th season of the reality show Top Model. At the beginning of December, together with Julia Wieniawa and Arek Kłusowski, she released a Christmas single "Wspólna chwila", which was created for a new Allegro promotional spot.

In 2021, the publishing house Wielka Litera released the singer's debut novel Jestem Marysia i chyba się zabiję dzisiaj. Later, the audiobook was also released.

Over the years of her musical activity, she has performed at music festivals, such as the European Music Fair CoJestGrane in Warsaw, Enea Spring Break in Poznań, Open'er Festival, Krakow Live Festival, Orange Warsaw Festival, Męskie Granie, Late Summer Festival, United Islands of Prague and FEST Festival. She performed as a support act for French singer Imany at her concerts in Poznań and Warsaw.

Since March 2020 she has been hosting her own programme Alfabet Spolsky on newonce.radio.

On 11 November 2025, coincidentally with Poland's Independence Day, she released her fourth studio album titled Kocham Polskę ("I love Poland"). She submitted the eponymous lead single to the Polish national final for the Eurovision Song Contest 2026 and grew to become one of the main favourites among the fan community, making the initial list of ten finalists before withdrawing due to the controversial decision to include Israel in light of the Gaza war.

=== Personal life ===
In October 2021, Żak confirmed she is in a relationship. She is an ally of the LGBT community.

== Discography ==
=== Studio albums ===
- Miło Było Pana Poznać (2017)
- Dekalog Spolsky (2019)
- Erotik Era (2023)
- Kocham Polskę (2025)
