= Stereo typ =

Studio album by Kayah
- Released: 22 August, 2003
- Genres: Pop; soul
- Length: 55:25
- Languages: Polish; English
- Labels: Zic Zac; BMG Poland
- Producers: Kayah; Krzysztof Pszona

Kayah chronology
JakaJaKayah (2000)	Stereo typ (2003)	The Best & the Rest (2005)

Professional ratings
Review scores
Source	Rating
Codzienna Gazeta Muzyczna	5/5 stars
Europopmusic	3/5 stars

Stereo typ is a studio album by Polish singer Kayah, released in 2003 by Zic Zac and BMG Poland. It spawned one of the singer's biggest hits, "Testosteron".

== Background ==
Kayah wrote all lyrics on the album, except for "Do It Right", written by Mika Urbaniak, and "Testosteron", co-written with Krzysztof Pszona. The title refers to stereotypes surrounding Kayah as an artist and as a woman. Musically, the album is a combination of Pop and soul, with elements of funk and club music. The first single, "Testosteron", was another major hit for the singer, reaching number 2 in the Polish airplay chart. The second and final single, "Do D.N.A.", met only with minor success. Kayah first premiered some of the new material live at the 40th Sopot International Song Festival on 23 August 2003. The album was subsequently promoted by Stereo Tour in various clubs in Poland.

Stereo typ entered the Polish album sales chart at number 1 and remained in the top 10 for nine weeks. It was certified gold in Poland for sales exceeding 35,000 copies. The album was also nominated to the Fryderyk award for the Best Pop Album.

== Track listing ==
1. "Do D.N.A." – 4:32
2. "Jeszcze ta noc" – 3:15
3. "Większy apetyt" – 5:22
4. "Testosteron" – 3:07
5. "Kołysanka dla serca" – 5:03
6. "Twoja dłoń" – 4:45
7. "Prośba do twoich ust" – 4:23
8. "Teren zaminowany" – 4:18
9. "Nigdy się nie dowiem czy" – 3:35
10. "Dzielę na pół" – 6:04
11. "Dobre złe nieważne" – 3:41
12. "Mądrala Mont Rala" – 4:32
13. "Do It Right" – 2:49

"Testosteron" (Video)

== Charts ==
Chart (2003)	Peak position
Polish Albums (OLiS)	1

== Certifications ==
Region	Certification	Certified units/sales
Poland (ZPAV)	Gold	35,000
