= Songbook (Goran Bregović album) =

Compilation album by Goran Bregović
- Released: 2000
- Label: Mercury Records - Universal

Songbook is a 2000 compilation by Goran Bregović. It summs the results of Goran Bregović's 1990s creative work. Besides including his music for films La Reine Margot, Underground, Arizona Dream, Time of the Gypsies, and Toxic Affair, it also features such world-famous singers as Iggy Pop, Ofra Haza, Sezen Aksu, Cesária Évora and George Dalaras.

== Track listing ==
1. Song for Elena (Original title: Ena tragoudi ya tin Heleni) by George Dalaras 3:25 (Goran Bregović)
2. Get the Money by Iggy Pop 4:50 (Iggy Pop / Goran Bregović)
3. Le Matin 2:28 (Goran Bregović)
4. Gul by Sezen Aksu 3:55 (Sezen Aksu - Meral Okay - Goran Bregović)
5. Kalasnjikov by Goran Bregovic 4:35 (Goran Bregović)
6. Elo Hi by Ofra Haza 4:09 (Bezaled Aloni - Ofra Haza / Goran Bregović)
7. TV Screen by Iggy Pop 5:17 (Iggy Pop / Goran Bregović)
8. Ederlezi by Vaska Jankovska 3:45 (Goran Bregović)
9. American Dreamers (featuring Johnny Depp) 5:03 (Emir Kusturica / Goran Bregović)
10. Venzinadiko - Gas Station (Original title: Kustino Oro) by Alkistis Protopsalti 3:13 (Lina Nocolakopoulou / Traditionnel)
11. Mesecina - Moonlight by Slobodan Salijevic 3:58 (Emir Kusturica - Kovačević / Goran Bregović - Bajramović), arrgts: Goran Bregović
12. 100 Lat Młodej Parze by Kayah 3:11 (Kayah - Goran Bregović / Goran Bregović)
13. Ausencia by Cesária Évora 3:46 (Teofilo Chantre / Goran Bregović)
14. Man From Reno by Scott Walker 4:16 (Scott Engel / Goran Bregović)
