= Mamko Moja =

Mamko Moja ("Ej mamko, mamko, mamënko moja" ("Oh mother, my mother")) is a Slovak Roma folk song.

It is a traditional a wedding song about a girl who desperately wants to get married, which first appeared in male choruses on Moravian and Slovak folk poetry. It has been partly attributed to Leoš Janáček. The Megitza Quartet performed the song live on ABC7's "Chicagoing" with Bill Campbell in September 2009. The Roma folk group Goranie have also performed the song.

== Text ==
Original Slovak Lyrics	Translation Into English
Mamko moja, ja už še vám vydam, bo me pyta spoza hury Cigan. Refrén: A či ja ce na to vychovala, že by ja ce za Cigana dala. Mamko moja, Cigan še mi páči, bo ma šumné kučeravé vlasy. Refrén (2x): A či ja ce na to vychovala, že by ja ce za Cigana dala. Mamko moja, Cigan še mi ľúbi, bo ma šumné biľučičké zuby. Refrén (2x): A či ja ce na to vychovala, že by ja ce za Cigana dala.	Oh, Mother, I'm getting married, A wandering Romani made the proposal. Chorus: But did I raise you to that? Should I give you for a Romani? Oh, Mother, for this Romani has amazed me, He has beautiful curly hair. Chorus (2x): But did I raise you to that? Should I give you for a Romani? Oh, Mother, this Romani has delighted me, He has such beautiful white teeth. Chorus (2x): But did I raise you to that? Should I give you for a Romani?
