= Zakopower =

Polish Goral folk music group

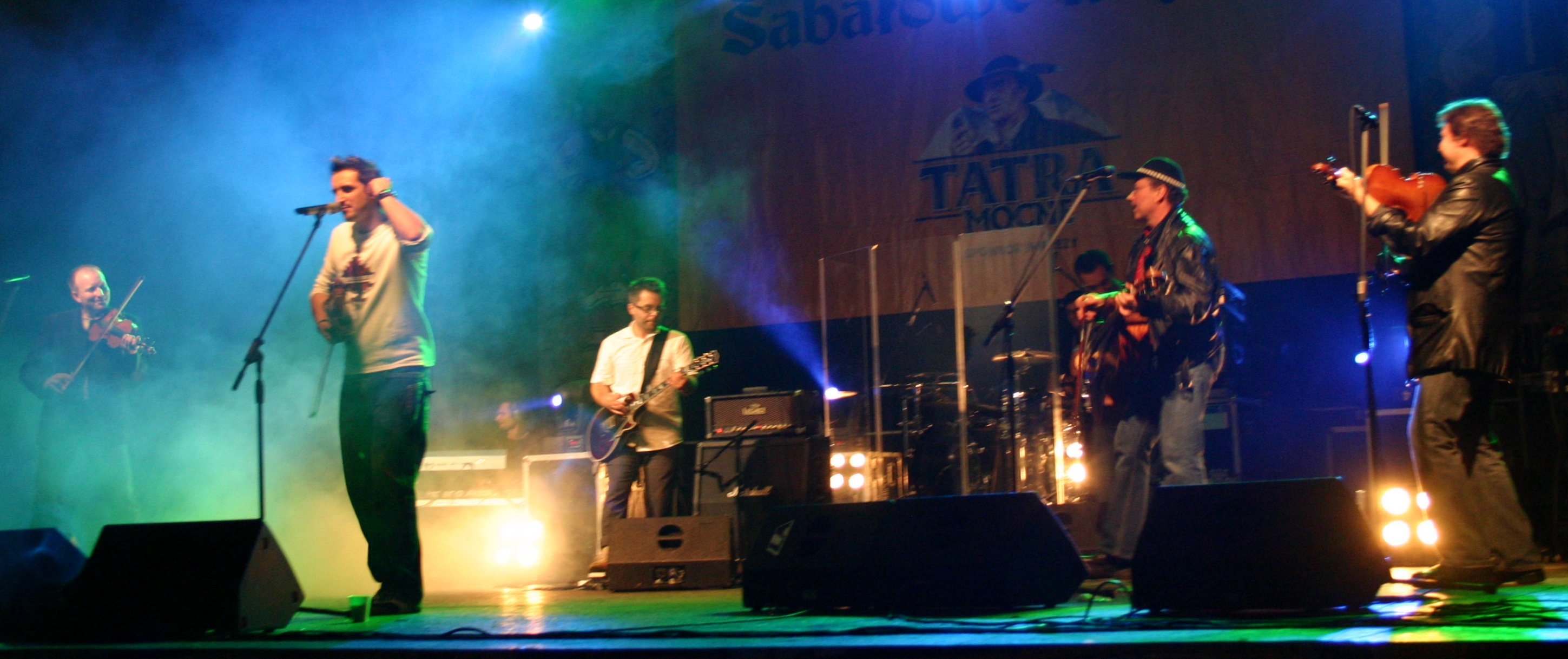
- Zakopower performing in 2006

Background information
- Origin: Poland
- Genres: folk, pop
- Years active: 2005 - present
- Label: Kayax
- Members: Sebastian Karpiel-Bułecka, Wojciech Topa, Bartek Kudasik, Józek Chyc, Piotr Rychlec, Michał Trąbski, Łukasz Moskal, Tomek Krawczyk
- Website: www.zakopower.pl

Zakopower is a Polish Goral folk music group. It is named after Zakopane, the hometown of its lead singer.

== Awards ==
- 2008 - Fryderyk award for Folk Album of the Year
- 2008 - National Festival of Polish Song in Opole, Grand Prix

== Discography ==
=== Studio albums ===
Title	Album details	Peak chart positions	Sales	Certifications
Title	Album details	POL	Sales	Certifications
Music Hal	Released: 16 May 2005; Label: Kayax / EMI Music Poland; Formats: CD, digital download	7		
Na siedem	Released: 3 December 2007; Label: Kayax / EMI Music Poland; Formats: CD, digital download	33	POL: 15,000+	POL: Gold
Boso	Released: 30 May 2011; Label: Kayax / EMI Music Poland; Formats: CD, digital download	1	POL: 90,000+	POL: 3× Platinum
Kolędowo	Released: 26 November 2013; Label: Kayax / Parlophone Music Poland; Formats: CD, digital download	4		
"—" denotes a recording that did not chart or was not released in that territory.

=== Video albums ===
Title	Album details	Sales	Certifications
Koncertowo	Released: 17 April 2009; Label: Kayax / EMI Music Poland; Formats: DVD	POL: 5,000+	POL: Gold
