= Ave Maria (album) =

Studio album by Maria Peszek
- Released: 10 September 2021
- Genre: Alternative pop
- Language: Polish
- Label: Mystic Production
- Producer: Maria Peszek, Kamil Pater

Maria Peszek chronology
Karabin (2016)	Ave Maria (2021)

Singles from Ave Maria
- 1. "Virunga" Released: 9 June 2021; 2. "Ave Maria" Released: 2 July 2021; 3. "J*bię to wszystko" Released: 4 August 2021; 4. "Barbarka" Released: 10 September 2021

Ave Maria is the fifth studio album by Polish singer Maria Peszek, released in 2021 by Mystic Production. Peszek co-wrote and co-produced the material with Kamil Pater. Thematically, the album criticises Poland's conservative politics and child sexual abuse in the Catholic Church, and expresses support towards women's rights and the Polish LGBT community. Peszek described it as "probably the most beautiful album [she has] ever recorded".

Ave Maria received generally positive reviews and debuted atop the Polish album sales chart.

== Track listing ==
1. "Ave Maria" – 4:22
2. "J*bię to wszystko" – 4:53 ("Fuck It All")
3. "Virunga" – 3:56
4. "Dzikie dziecko" – 3:18 ("Wild Child")
5. "Szambo wybiło" – 5:25 ("Cesspit Has Broken")
6. "Viva la vulva" – 3:37 ("Long Live the Vulva")
7. "Lovesong" – 3:33
8. "Pusto" – 5:54 ("Empty")
9. "Nic o Polsce" – 3:56 ("Nothing About Poland")
10. "Barbarka" (feat. Oskar83) – 5:00

== Charts ==
Chart (2021)	Peak position
Poland	1
