= Track Three =

Single by Scott Walker

from the album Climate of Hunter
- B-side: "Blanket Roll Blues"
- Released: March 1984
- Recorded: October–December 1983
- Studio: The Town House, EMI & Sarm West Studios
- Genre: Art rock
- Length: 3:50
- Label: Virgin Records
- Songwriter: Scott Walker
- Producers: Peter Walsh, Scott Walker

Scott Walker singles chronology
"Delta Dawn" (1974)	"Track Three" (1984)	"Man From Reno" (1993)

"Track Three" (informal title: "Delayed") is a song written and recorded by American singer-songwriter Scott Walker in 1983. This was Walker's eighth solo single in the UK and was released in March 1984 to promote his 'comeback' solo album Climate of Hunter. A stylised black and white music video was produced for the single. The single however did not chart. It was also to be his only single of the 1980s and his last released in the UK.

"Track Three" is also notable as it is only the third A-side written by Walker. To date Walker had only written four singles, the others being "Deadlier Than the Male" (1966), "The Electrician" (1978) and "Man From Reno" (1993). The single was backed with Climate of Hunter's lone cover "Blanket Roll Blues", originally featured in the 1959 film The Fugitive Kind sung by Marlon Brando. "Blanket Roll Blues" is the only song lyric ever written by Tennessee Williams.

== Recording and music ==
Walker wrote "Track Three" along with the rest of Climate of Hunter between August and September 1983. It was recorded at The Town House, EMI and Sarm West Studios between October and December that same year and was produced by Peter Walsh and Scott Walker.

Walker made the unusual choice to give the song along with three others written for the album no proper titles, simply denoting them by their placement in the album's running order ("Track Three", "Track Five", "Track Six" and "Track Seven"). He explained in a TV interview on music programme The Tube that the songs were complete and that titles might 'lopside' or 'overload' them, presumably giving artificially undue weight to one line of the lyric over the others.

== Track listing ==
Virgin Records - VS666
No.	Title	Writer(s)	Length
1.	"Track Three"	Scott Walker	3:50
2.	"Blanket Roll Blues"	Tennessee Williams (Lyrics), Kenyon Hopkins (Music)	3:16

== Personnel ==
"Track Three"

- Mo Foster – bass
- Brian Gascoigne – keyboards
- Peter Van Hooke – drums
- Mark Isham – trumpet
- Billy Ocean – harmony vocal
- Phil Palmer – lead & background guitars
- Ray Russell – lead & background guitars

"Blanket Roll Blues"

- Mark Knopfler – guitars

Technical and visual

- Peter Walsh, Scott Walker – Producer
- Peter Walsh – Engineer
- Bob Carlos Clarke – Photography
- c•more•tone – Sleeve Design
