= Kamień (album) =

Studio album by Kayah
- Released: 5 November 1995
- Genre: Pop; soul; jazz
- Length: 70:42
- Language: Polish
- Label: Zic Zac; BMG Poland
- Producer: Kayah; Marek Kościkiewicz

Kayah chronology
Kayah (1988)	Kamień (1995)	Zebra (1997)

Professional ratings
Review scores
Source	Rating
Europopmusic	3/5 stars

Kamień is a studio album by Polish singer Kayah, released in 1995 by Zic Zac and BMG Poland. It was a critical and commercial success and spawned one of Kayah's biggest hits, "Fleciki".

== Background ==
Although Kamień was Kayah's second studio album, the singer considers it her 'proper' debut album, excluding the 1988 self-titled LP from her official discography. Kayah wrote and co-produced all material on Kamień which musically is a blend of pop, soul and jazz. The album was supported by four singles: "Jak liść" and "Nawet deszcz" in 1995, followed by "Fleciki" and "Santana" in 1996.

Kamień was an unexpected commercial success, earning gold certification in Poland. It was also well received by music critics and earned a nomination to the Fryderyk award as the Pop Album of the Year.

== Track listing ==
1. "Nawet deszcz" – 6:17
2. "Tam będę" – 3:35
3. "Bo czasem" – 3:36
4. "Pod tym samym niebem" – 4:27
5. "Ja chcę ciebie" – 7:11
6. "Smutna kobieta" – 5:58
7. "Fleciki" – 5:02
8. "Jak liść" – 4:57
9. "Cień anioła stróża" – 5:18
10. "Santana" – 4:40
11. "Jestem kamieniem" – 3:20
12. "Cień anioła stróża" (Remix) – 5:18
13. "Jestem kamieniem" (Remix) – 3:20
14. "Ja chcę ciebie" (Remix) – 7:14

== Charts ==
Chart (1996)	Peak position
Polish Albums	16

== Certifications ==
Region	Certification	Certified units/sales
Poland (ZPAV)	Gold	100,000
