= Jezus Maria Peszek =

Studio album by Maria Peszek
- Released: 3 October 2012
- Genre: Alternative pop
- Length: 41:28
- Language: Polish
- Label: Mystic Production
- Producer: Maria Peszek, Michał "Fox" Król

Maria Peszek chronology
Maria Awaria (2008)	Jezus Maria Peszek (2012)	Karabin (2016)

Jezus Maria Peszek is the third studio album by Polish singer Maria Peszek, released in 2012 by Mystic Production. The singer co-wrote and co-produced the material with Michał "Fox" Król. The album's lyrics reference Peszek's atheism and nervous breakdown which she had suffered prior to recording the material. Most songs also criticise such concepts as organized religion, patriotism and social norms, which caused further controversies. Jezus Maria Peszek turned out another major success for the singer, gathering favourable reviews, debuting atop Polish albums chart and eventually receiving platinum certification. Jezus Maria Peszek was hailed by some journalists as Peszek's best album yet and one of the best albums of 2012. Peszek performed concerts in Poland, Ireland, England and Czech Republic to promote the album.

== Track listing ==
1. "Ludzie psy" – 3:39 ("The Dog People")
2. "Nie ogarniam" – 3:24 ("I Don't Get It")
3. "Wyścigówka" – 2:37 ("Race Car")
4. "Amy" – 4:08
5. "Żwir" – 3:36 ("Gravel")
6. "Sorry Polsko" – 3:00 ("Sorry, Poland")
7. "Pan nie jest moim pasterzem" – 3:26 ("The Lord Is Not My Shepherd")
8. "Pibloktoq" – 4:08
9. "Padam" – 3:13 ("I'm Falling")
10. "Nie wiem czy chcę" – 3:56 ("I Don't Know If I Want")
11. "Szara flaga" – 3:56 ("Grey Flag")
12. "Zejście awaryjne" – 2:25 ("Emergency Exit")

== Singles ==
- 2012: "Padam"
- 2012: "Ludzie psy"
- 2013: "Sorry Polsko"
- 2013: "Pan nie jest moim pasterzem"

== Commercial performance ==
Chart (2012)	Peak position	Certification	Sales
Poland	1	Platinum	30,000
