= Karabin =

Studio album by Maria Peszek
- Released: 26 February 2016
- Genre: Alternative pop
- Length: 40:50
- Language: Polish
- Label: Warner Music Poland
- Producers: Maria Peszek, Michał "Fox" Król

Maria Peszek chronology
Jezus Maria Peszek (2012)	Karabin (2016)	Ave Maria (2021)

Karabin is the fourth studio album by Polish singer Maria Peszek, released in 2016 by Warner Music Poland. The singer co-wrote and co-produced the material with Michał "Fox" Król. The album explored such topics as freedom, individualism and hate speech. Although it did not match the critical success of its predecessors, having met with mixed reviews, it went gold in Poland in just over a month and eventually was certified platinum. To promote the album, Peszek performed concerts in Poland, Ireland, England and Czech Republic.

== Track listing ==
1. "Gwiazda" – 3:37 ("Star")
2. "Krew na ulicach" – 3:48 ("Blood on the Streets")
3. "Elektryk" – 3:18 ("Electrician")
4. "Żołnierzyk" – 4:36 ("Little Soldier")
5. "Tu i teraz" – 3:37 ("Here and Now")
6. "Jak pistolet" – 3:35 ("Like a Gun")
7. "Polska A B C i D" – 4:01 ("Poland A, B, C and D")
8. "Samotny tata" – 3:48 ("Lonely Dad")
9. "Ogień" – 3:33 ("Fire")
10. "Modern Holocaust" – 3:49
11. "Ej Maria" – 3:28 ("Hey, Mary")

== Singles ==
- 2016: "Polska A B C i D"
- 2016: "Modern Holocaust"
- 2016: "Samotny tata"
- 2016: "Ej Maria"

== Chart positions ==
Chart (2016)	Peak position	Certification	Sales
Poland	2	Platinum	30,000
