= Renata Przemyk =

Polish singer and songwriter

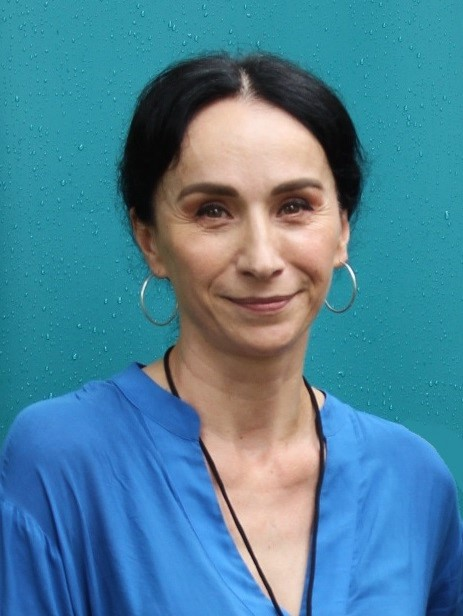

Background information
- Born: Renata Przemyk; February 10, 1966 (age 60); Bielsko-Biała, Poland
- Genres: rock, alternative, cold wave
- Occupations: Singer, songwriter, musician, artist
- Labels: MJM Music PL, Sony BMG Music Entertainment Poland, Sony Music Entertainment Poland, Universal Music Poland

Renata Janina Przemyk (born February 10, 1966, in Bielsko-Biała) is a Polish singer and songwriter.

== Biography ==
In Bielsko-Biała she attended primary and secondary school. She enjoyed her childhood together with her parents, grandmother and brothers. After finishing school, Renata moved to Katowice and began to study Czech philology at University of Śląsk.

In 1994 she moved to Cracow, and at the end of 1999 she decided to lead a quiet life in the country near Cracow, away from the fuss of a big city, which enabled her to compose, make arrangements of her own songs and bring up her daughter in a peaceful atmosphere.

== Career ==
Her career as a singer started when she was a teenager, by singing with local rock bands. However, she developed the real calling for music during her studies when she was inspired by the music of Tom Waits, Talking Heads and Frank Zappa. As a result of it, she started a band named "Ya Hozna" in 1989.

Despite the fact, that the group lasted only for a year, they managed to release an album entitled "Ya Hozna", the album that revealed a unique and original musical style of Renata Przemyk. After her music began to catch on, she started her solo career.

As an independent artist Renata has recorded and edited the following albums: "Mało zdolna szansonistka" (1992), "Tylko kobieta" (1994), "Andergrant" (1996), "Hormon" (1999), "Blizna" (2001), "Balladyna" (2002) – soundtrack from a play directed by Jan Machulski, "The best of" (2003) – a compilation of her most interesting songs, "Unikat" (2006).

Renata has been accompanied by her friend and manager – Anna Saraniecka, who is the author of the lyrics of her songs.

Most of Renata's albums were awarded with a status of "golden album" for selling over 50.000 copies. Moreover, they were nominated and awarded many times – mostly for artistic individuality. She was placed on the list of most influential artists of the past millennium.

From the beginning of her career, the singer has also won numerous awards in various festivals in which she took part, including first prize in the festival in Cracow, "Karolinka" in Opole and "Bursztynowy Slowik" in Sopot.

As an artist that connects rock sounds with poetry and theatrical performance she could perform both on the stage of a rock festival in Jarocin, and prestigious festivals of stage song that took place in Wrocław and Köln. She has given concerts in France (Normandy, Brittany, Paris) and in the USA (New York) but because of the lyrics being written in her native language, she prefers to perform in front of the Polish audiences, which can fully appreciate the words and also sing the songs with her.

Her interests include music, art, cinema, 19th and 20th century literature, modern theater and graphic drawing.

Although she has worked and collaborated with various artists, her own art is independently produced with her retaining creative control.

It is hard to classify her music – neither rock nor alternative nor poetry can describe what's deep inside it. She calls her music "an everlasting search for tones, sounds, emotions and climates not similar to anything that had been made before". That's why each album is different from the previous one. Nevertheless, there is always one motif in common – on every album we can hear the sound of accordion, an instrument the artist likes, despite all trends and fashions.

An individual and unique style of Renata's music has its origin in post-punk tones. However, the artist has been constantly using various instruments in her musical career. The electronic sounds were used for the first time by Renata on an album entitled "Hormon" in 1999, which at the same time was the first album composed by her. Since then she and the author of lyrics Anna Saraniecka have been the only "parents" of Renata's successes.

What is more, in voting contests by two most important Polish weeklies – Polityka and Wprost, Renata has been chosen one of the most important artists of the last century.

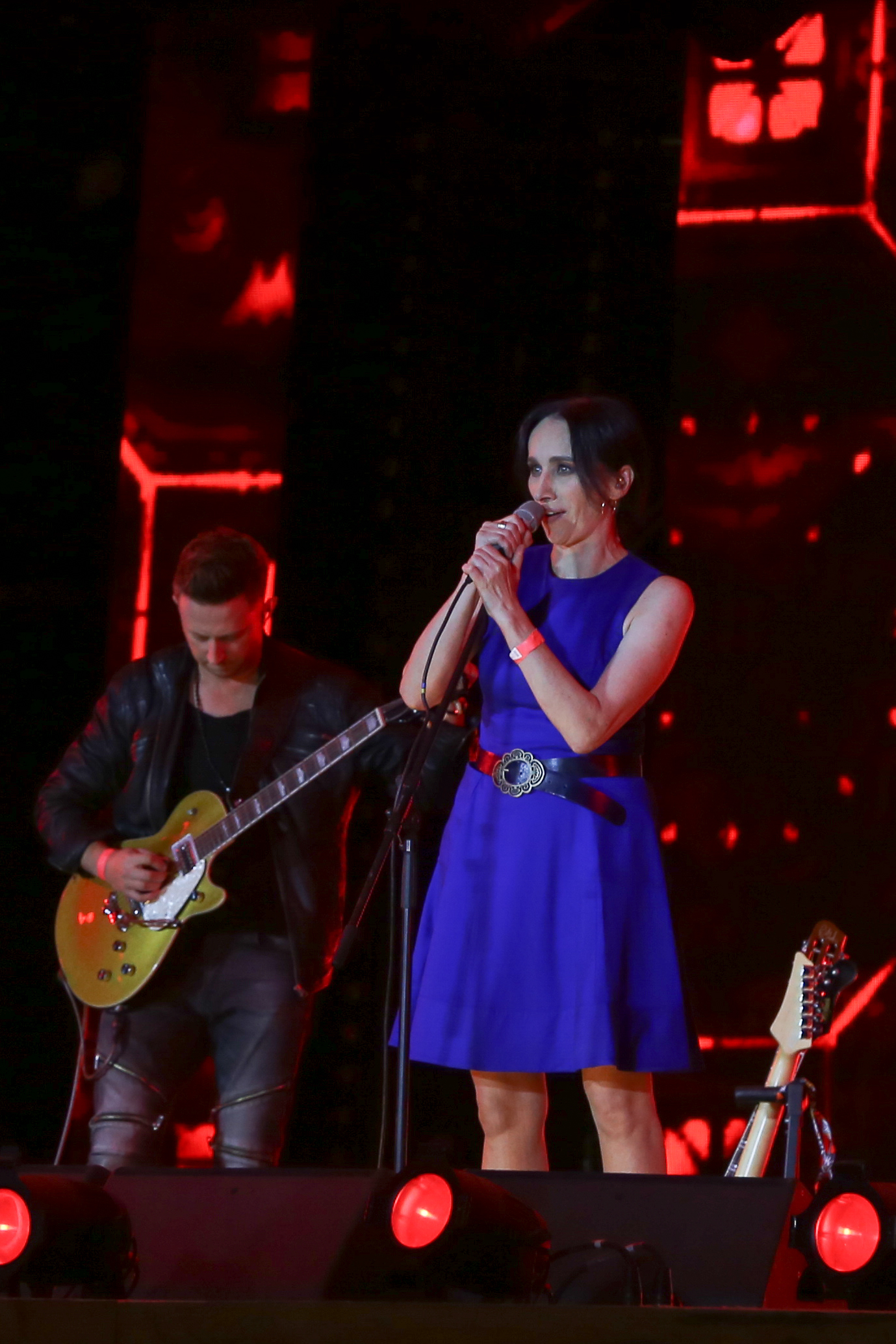
Renata Przemyk at the Pol'and'Rock Festival 2021

== Discography ==
=== Studio albums ===
Title	Album details	Peak chart positions	Sales	Certifications
Title	Album details	POL	Sales	Certifications
Ya hozna	Released: 1989; Label: Pronit; Formats: CD, CS, LP, DL	—		
Mało zdolna szansonistka	Released: 1992; Label: MJM Music; Formats: CD, CS, LP	—		
Tylko kobieta	Released: 1994; Label: MJM Music; Formats: CD, CS	—		
Andergrant	Released: November 1, 1996; Label: Sony BMG Poland; Formats: CD, CS	—		
Hormon	Released: February 16, 1999; Label: Sony BMG Poland; Formats: CD, CS	—		
Blizna	Released: May 21, 2001; Label: Sony Music Poland; Formats: CD, CS	23		
Unikat	Released: March 27, 2006; Label: Sony BMG Poland; Formats: CD	12		
Odjazd	Released: November 16, 2009; Label: QL Music; Formats: CD	19	POL: 15,000+	POL: Gold
Rzeźba dnia	Released: September 30, 2014; Label: Universal Music Poland; Formats: CD	22		
"—" denotes a recording that did not chart or was not released in that territory.

=== Compilation albums ===
Title	Album details	Peak chart positions
Title	Album details	POL
The best of Renata Przemyk	Released: April 14, 2003; Label: Sony BMG Poland; Formats: CD, CS	17
Renata Przemyk Akustik Trio	Released: September 21, 2012; Label: Impress-Art; Formats: CD, DL	26
"—" denotes a recording that did not chart or was not released in that territory.

=== Collaborative albums ===
Title	Album details	Peak chart positions
Title	Album details	POL
Panienki z temperamentem with Kayah	Released: October 25, 2010; Label: QM Music; Formats: CD, DL	10
Dobra Nowina (Good Message) with Megitza	Released: December 22, 2012; Label: Megitza; Formats: CD, DL	—
"—" denotes a recording that did not chart or was not released in that territory.

=== Live albums ===
Title	Album details
Renata Przemyk w Trójce	Released: September 23, 2013; Label: Polskie Radio; Formats: CD, DL

=== Soundtracks ===
Title	Album details
Balladyna	Released: June 24, 2002; Label: Sony Music Poland; Formats: CD
