= Man from Reno (song) =

Single by Scott Walker and Goran Bregović
- B-side: "Indecent Sacrifice"
- Released: 1993
- Genre: Art Rock
- Length: 4:21
- Label: Fontana Records
- Songwriter(s): Scott Walker, Goran Bregović
- Producer(s): Goran Bregović

Scott Walker singles chronology
"Track Three" (1984)	"Man from Reno" (1993)

"Man from Reno" is a song written by musician and composer Goran Bregović with lyrics by American singer-songwriter Scott Walker in 1993. The song was recorded and released by Bregović and Walker for the 1993 French comedy film Toxic Affair, directed by Philoméne Esposito. Bregović composed the rest of the film's score. A stylised sepia-toned music video was produced for the single. The single was Walker's seventh and last solo single.

"Man from Reno" shares lyrical elements with "Farmer in the City" from Walker's 1995 album Tilt, and musical elements with "Ipak poželim neko pismo" from Bregović's former band Bijelo Dugme 1979 album Bitanga i princeza.

"Man from Reno" is also notable as it is only the fourth A-side written by Walker. In his career Walker only wrote four singles, the others being; "Deadlier Than the Male" (1966), "The Electrician" (1978) and "Track Three" (1984). The single was backed with a second song written and recorded with Bregović; "Indecent Sacrifice". The obscure songs have since been released on compilations of Walker's and Bregović's work, notably Songbook and Scott Walker in 5 Easy Pieces.

== Track listing ==
All lyrics are written by Scott Engel; all music is composed by Goran Bregović

Fontana Records
No.	Title	Length
1.	"Man from Reno"	4:21
2.	"Indecent Sacrifice"	4:07
