= Kayah (singer) =

Polish singer-songwriter (born 1967)

- Kayah in 2023
- Born: Katarzyna Magdalena Szczot; 5 November 1967 (age 58); Warsaw, Poland
- Occupations: Singer-songwriter; producer; television and radio personality
- Years active: 1984–present
- Musical career
- Genres: Pop, Soul, R&B, Jazz, World, Dance, Funk
- Labels: Kayax; Agora; Sony Music; BMG Poland; Zic Zac; QM Music; Rogot; Polskie Nagrania Muza
- Website: www.kayah.pl

Katarzyna Magdalena Rooijens (née Szczot; born 5 November 1967), professionally known as Kayah, is a Polish singer-songwriter performing a variety of music genres, including pop, soul, jazz, world and dance. She has also experimented with disco, funk, electronica as well as Balkan and Jewish music.

Kayah released her first self-written album in 1995 and has since established herself as one of the most critically and commercially successful Polish singers. She is one of the most awarded artists by the Polish Society of the Phonographic Industry (ZPAV) and has placed fourth on Polish music magazine Machina's list of "50 best Polish female singers". Kayah has sold over one million records in Poland and most of her albums have been certified platinum or gold by ZPAV. Particularly successful was the 1999 collaborative album Kayah i Bregović, recorded with Yugoslav musician Goran Bregović, which was certified diamond for selling over 700,000 copies, and spawned hit singles "Śpij kochanie, śpij" and "Prawy do lewego". Her other hits include "Fleciki", "Na językach", "Supermenka", "Testosteron", "Prócz ciebie, nic" with Polish singer Krzysztof Kiljański and "Po co" with Israeli musician Idan Raichel. She has also collaborated with Cape Verdean singer Cesária Évora.

In the early 2000s, Kayah co-founded her own record label, Kayax, which has since signed many successful artists and released numerous critically acclaimed albums. She has also hosted a number of television and radio shows and occasionally appeared in TV series and films in Poland. Kayah has also been outspoken politically, having supported Poland's Women's Party and the Committee for the Defence of Democracy. She is also an ally and supporter of the Polish LGBT community.

== Background and early life ==
Kayah was born in Warsaw to a Polish mother and a Jewish father, but grew up with her grandparents in Białystok. She has two stepsisters on her father's side. Her grandmother was the cousin of Polish poet Konstanty Ildefons Gałczyński and Polish writer Maria Dąbrowska.

As a young girl, Kayah wanted to be an archaeologist or a basketball player, and prior to musical career, she worked in a shop selling ties. Kayah's pseudonym is 'Kaja' written phonetically in English, which was her childhood nickname, a kind of a diminutive from her birth name, Katarzyna.

== Career ==
Kayah started performing with various bands from the mid-1980s and appeared as a backing vocalist in the song "Mówię ci, że..." by Polish rock band Tilt, which was a hit in 1986. She debuted as a solo artist in 1988 at the National Festival of Polish Song in Opole performing the song "Córeczko", which she co-wrote, and subsequently took part in the Baltic Song Contest in Karlshamn, Sweden. The same year, her first full-length eponymous album was released by Polskie Nagrania Muza, which consisted of material written by Maciej Zembaty, John Porter and Neil Black, yet originally intended for another artist. The label did little to promote the record, leading to its commercial failure, and today Kayah does not include it in her official discography. The singer tried to terminate the hastily signed, disadvantageous record deal, which she has described as "incapacitating", and eventually succeeded.

=== 1990s ===
In 1991, the English language version of Kayah's debut album was released by Rogot without her consent. The singer relocated to Vienna where she briefly worked as a model. In the early 1990s, she also contributed backing vocals for such artists as De Mono, Grzegorz Ciechowski and Paweł Stasiak. In 1993, she appeared in a self-written song "Mówili o mnie" on a live album by Polish band Republika. In 1994, she performed her song "Ja chcę ciebie" at the Opole Festival where she received a special award, and at the Baltic Song Contest where she came second.

Her first self-written and co-produced solo album, Kamień, was released in November 1995 by Zic Zac and BMG Poland. It consisted of melancholy pop songs, influenced by soul and jazz. The album included the popular single "Fleciki" and was an unexpected commercial success, earning gold certification in Poland. It was also nominated to the Fryderyk award as the Pop Album of the Year and Kayah herself won in the Female Vocalist of the Year category. In March 1997, she released the album Zebra, heavily inspired by soul, funk and disco music of the 70s. It was promoted by two singles, "Na językach" and "Supermenka", which both reached the top of the Polish airplay chart. The latter's music video featured a guest appearance by Ice-T. Zebra was a critical and commercial success, quickly receiving platinum certification and selling over 200,000 copies. It was awarded with a Fryderyk for the Pop Album of the Year and Kayah received awards for the Composer, Author, and Female Vocalist of the Year. Later in 1997, Kayah released the duet "Uwierz... to nie ja" with Polish singer Urszula which also became a hit.

In 1998, Kayah hosted the TV show To było grane on the newly launched Polish channel TVN. She also met the Yugoslav musician Goran Bregović with whom she went on to record a collaborative album, Kayah i Bregović, released in April 1999. It consisted of various songs from Bregović's repertoire to which Kayah wrote Polish lyrics and musically was a blend of Balkan music and Polish folk. The first two singles released from the album, "Śpij kochanie, śpij" and "Prawy do lewego", became major hits in Poland and the record itself went on to sell in excess of 700,000 copies which earned it a diamond certification. The album received a Fryderyk for the Pop Album of the Year and Kayah once again won as the Best Female Artist award. Following its nationwide success in Poland, BMG decided to distribute the album in a number of European countries.

=== 2000s ===
Kayah's next solo album, JakaJaKayah, was released in May 2000 and incorporated elements of soul, world and electronic music. The lead single "JakaJaKayah" met with considerable success in Poland and was the first music video aired on MTV Polska. The album received favourable reviews, got a nomination to the Pop Album of the Year Fryderyk award, and was certified platinum in Poland for selling over 100,000 copies. In 2001, its special edition was released, featuring the new single "Embarcação" recorded with Cape Verdean singer Cesária Évora. The album was then released internationally as YakaYaKayah with English language versions of some of the songs. Kayah also contributed the self-written song "Wiosna przyjdzie i tak" to Polish film Przedwiośnie. In 2002, she featured on Michał Żebrowski's album Poczytaj mi tato 2 in the song "Dobry potwór nie jest zły".

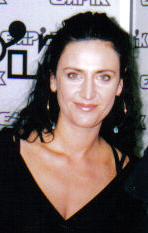
Kayah in 2007

In August 2003, Kayah released Stereo typ, an album incorporating soul, funk and club music. The first single, "Testosteron", was another major hit for the singer, reaching number 2 in the Polish airplay chart. The album debuted at number 1 in the Polish albums sales chart, was certified gold by ZPAV, and received three nominations to the Fryderyk award. In 2004, Kayah contributed the theme song to the Polish version of the animated film Brother Bear and recorded the song "Prócz ciebie, nic" with Krzysztof Kiljański which was another major hit, reaching the top of the airplay chart. By that time, she had co-founded her own record label, Kayax, and went on to release acclaimed albums by niche and avantgarde artists.

The singer released her first compilation in April 2005, The Best & the Rest, a 2-disc set featuring all of her greatest hits, including the new popular single "Jutro rano", as well as less popular tracks. It entered the Polish chart at number 1 and was certified gold. The compilation fulfilled Kayah's contract with Sony BMG Music Entertainment Poland and the singer effectively parted ways with the label. In late 2006, she released the EP with Christmas music Kolędy śpiewa Kayah and became the first artist in East-Central Europe to perform an acoustic concert as part of the MTV Unplugged series. The recording from the event was released in March 2007 as live CD and DVD MTV Unplugged, which reached number 4 in the albums chart and received gold certification. She also curated the compilation Music 4 Boys & Gays to support the Polish LGBT community. In late 2008, Kayah released the Christmas single "Ding dong". Her first full-length studio album in six years, Skała, was released by Kayax in September 2009, and musically continued her 1995 album's soul and jazz sound. It was the singer's another number 1 album in Poland and was certified gold shortly after the premiere.

=== 2010s ===
2010 saw the release of two collaboration albums: Kayah & Royal Quartet with Royal String Quartet in March, consisting mostly of string interpretations of some of Kayah's songs, and Panienki z temperamentem with Renata Przemyk in November, which included covers of songs by Kabaret Starszych Panów. The former was certified gold and the latter reached the top 10 in the Polish albums chart. In spring 2011, she released the standalone single "Za późno" which was a top 5 airplay hit in Poland, and took part in the TV talent show The Voice of Poland, a Polish version of The Voice, as a member of the judging panel.

In 2012, Kayah performed at the Festival of Jewish Culture in Warsaw, collaborating with Bulgarian composer Atanas Valkov and various musicians of Polish, Ukrainian and Persian origins. The event resulted in the album Transoriental Orchestra, released in November 2013, on which the singer performed traditional Jewish songs from different regions of Europe and the Middle East in a range of languages. The album was certified platinum in Poland and Kayah went on to tour the material in Poland, Israel and Spain, among others. Also in 2013, she was honoured with the Order of Polonia Restituta for "outstanding contributions to Polish culture and achievements in artistic and creative work". In 2014, she performed at a concert in Warsaw commemorating the 10th anniversary of Poland's accession to the European Union and an event in Opole marking the 25th anniversary of Poland's 1989 partially democratic election. In 2015, she re-issued her breakthrough album Kamień to mark its 20th anniversary and embarked on a commemorative tour.

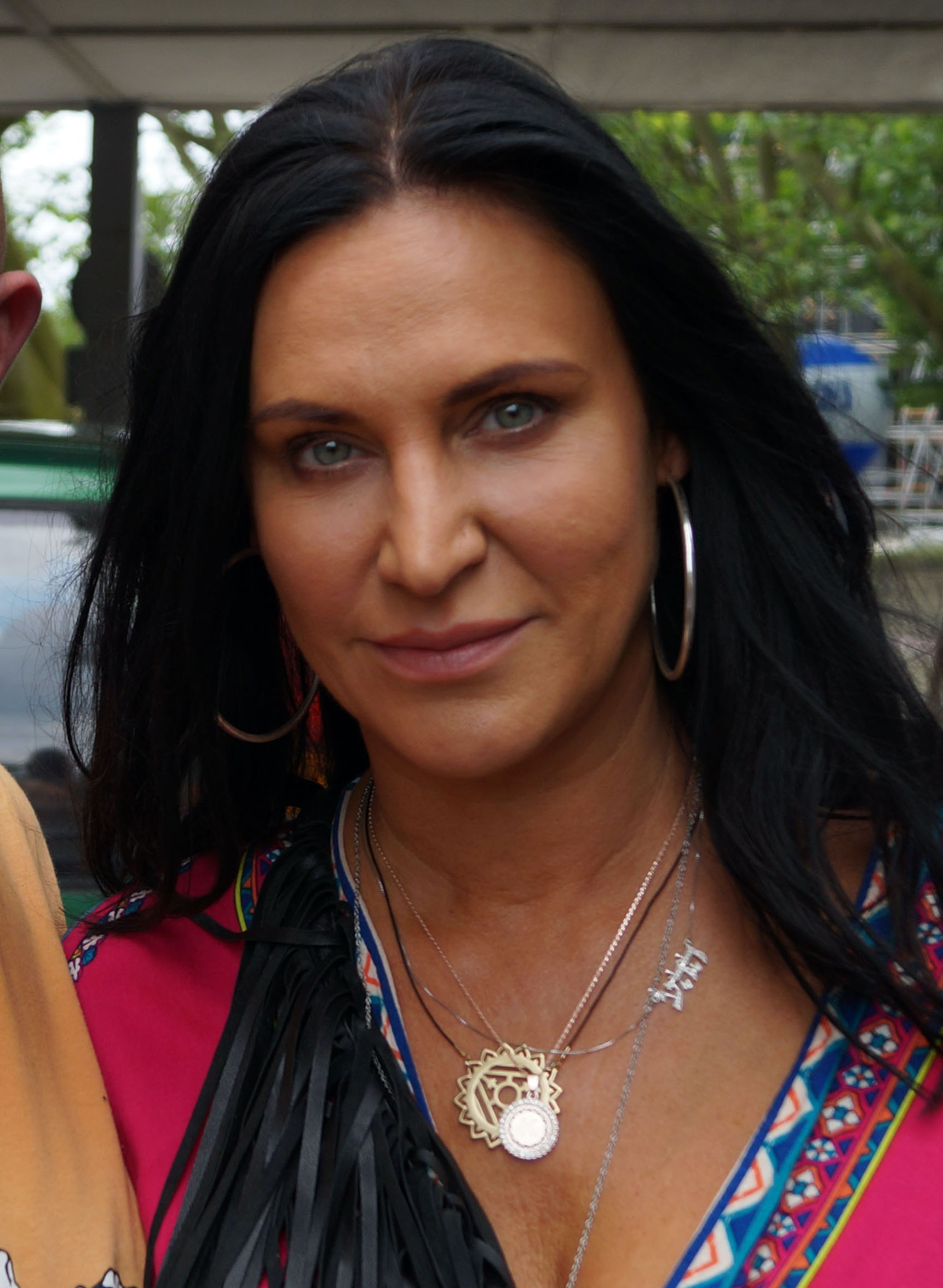
Kayah in 2016

In November 2016, the singer released Gdy pada śnieg, an album consisting of traditional Christmas carols and two new songs co-written by herself. The album reached number 7 in the Polish chart. She teamed up with Israeli musician Idan Raichel on the single "Po co", released in spring 2017, which was a top 3 airplay hit in Poland. In autumn, she went on tour with Goran Bregović and released the single "Podatek od miłości" with Grzegorz Hyży to promote film of the same name. The song reached number 5 in the airplay chart. She also started hosting her own radio show Tu i teraz on Meloradio. In 2018, Kayah released the project "Czarna polana" on which she collaborated with Atanas Valkov and director Tomasz Bagiński. She also featured on the tribute album to Józef Tischner titled Tischner. Mocna nuta and the posthumous Zbigniew Wodecki album Dobrze, że jesteś. In 2019, she released the single "Dawaj w długą" which was a moderate chart success.

=== 2020s ===
In early 2020, Kayah released the single "Ramię w ramię" with teenage singer Viki Gabor which reached number 4 in the airplay chart. Later that year, she duetted with Mery Spolsky on the song "Królestwo kobiet" promoting Polish TV series of the same name. She also guest featured in songs by various Polish artists: "Przejazdem" by Pectus, "Kocham cię" by Maria Sadowska, and "Nisko jest niebo" by Pezet. In 2021, Kayah released the song "Nie dzielcie nas" with Krzysztof Iwaneczko and teamed up with Nick Sinckler on the dance single "Kochaj różnym być". Later that year, she released the duet "Pod powieką" with Natalia Kukulska, based on Chopin's "Prelude in E minor".

== Personal life ==
On 5 August 1998, Kayah married Dutch-Polish TV producer Rinke Rooyens and gave birth to their son, Roch, on 1 December 1998. They separated in 2002 and eventually divorced in 2010. From 2005 to 2009, her partner was Sebastian Karpiel-Bułecka, the leader of Polish band Zakopower. The singer then was in a four-year relationship with Senegalese musician Pako Sarr, to whom she was reportedly engaged and planned to marry, but the couple eventually broke up in 2015. Since 2017, her partner is Polish financier Jarosław Grzywiński.

Kayah is vegetarian. In 2006, she started studying Kabbalah.

== Discography ==
- 1988: Kayah
- 1995: Kamień
- 1997: Zebra
- 1999: Kayah i Bregović (with Goran Bregović)
- 2000: JakaJaKayah
- 2003: Stereo typ
- 2005: The Best & the Rest
- 2006: Kolędy śpiewa Kayah
- 2007: MTV Unplugged
- 2009: Skała
- 2010: Kayah & Royal Quartet (with Royal String Quartet)
- 2010: Panienki z temperamentem (with Renata Przemyk)
- 2013: Transoriental Orchestra
- 2016: Gdy pada śnieg

== Filmography and TV work ==
Feature films

- 2006: Dublerzy – as Maria Corazzi
- 2009: Piksele
- 2019: Zabawa, zabawa

TV series

- 2005: Niania – as herself
- 2006: Dublerzy – as Maria Corazzi
- 2016: Druga szansa

TV shows

- 1998: To było grane – host
- 2008: Fabryka gwiazd – jury
- 2011: The Voice of Poland – coach

== Awards ==
- 1988: Audience award at the Baltic Song Contest for the song "Córeczko"
- 1993: Second place at the Sopot International Song Festival for the song "Liść"
- 1996: Fryderyk for the Best Female Singer
- 1998: Fryderyk for the Best Female Singer
- 1998: Fryderyk for the Best Composer
- 1998: Fryderyk for the Best Author
- 1998: Fryderyk for the Best Pop Album (Zebra)
- 2000: Fryderyk for the Best Female Singer
- 2000: Fryderyk for the Best Pop Album (Kayah i Bregović)
- 2000: Best Album award in the Machinery '99 contest for Kayah i Bregović
- 2000: Best Female Singer award in the Superjedynki contest
- 2000: Best Pop Album award in the Superjedynki contest for Kayah i Bregović
- 2000: Hit of the Year award in the Superjedynki contest for the song "Śpij kochanie, śpij"
