= Urszula Kasprzak =

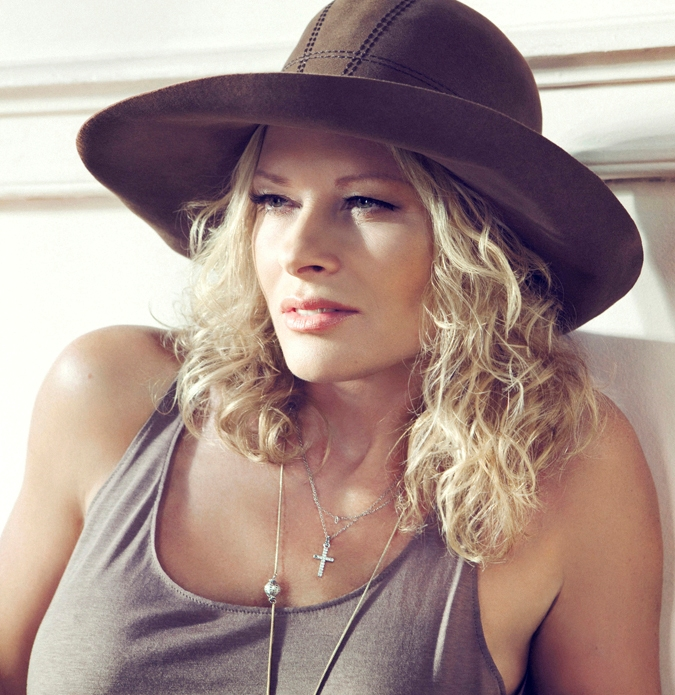
- Born: 7 February 1960 (age 66); Lublin, Poland
- Education: Maria Curie-Skłodowska University
- Occupation: Singer
- Spouse(s): 1. Stanisław Zybowski (his death); 2. Tomasz Kujawski
- Children: 2 (sons)
- Musical career
- Also known as: Urszula
- Genres: pop, rock
- Instruments: Guitar, keyboards
- Years active: 1977-present
- Labels: Savitor, Polton, Arston, Polskie Nagrania Muza, Zic Zac, BMG Poland, Magic Records, Universal Music Poland
- Website: www.urszula.art.pl

Urszula Beata Kasprzak, usually known simply as Urszula, (born 7 February 1960 in Lublin, Poland) is a Polish pop and rock singer and also a piano player and accordionist.

She recorded 15 albums, her music was used in TV and cinema films, and she acted in several films herself.

She gained popularity in Poland especially after recording music with the Polish rock band Budka Suflera.

== Discography ==
=== Studio albums ===
Title	Album details	Peak chart positions	Sales	Certifications
Title	Album details	POL	Sales	Certifications
Urszula	Released: 1983; Label: Savitor; Formats: LP, CD, CS	49		
Malinowy król	Released: 1985; Label: Polton; Formats: LP, CD, CS	47		
Urszula 3	Released: 1987; Label: Arston; Formats: LP, CD, CS	—		
Urszula czwarty raz	Released: 1988; Label: Polskie Nagrania Muza; Formats: LP, CD, CS	—		
Urszula & Jumbo	Released: 1992; Label: Polton; Formats: CD, CS	—		
Biała droga	Released: 21 March 1996; Label: Zic Zac; Formats: CD, CS	—	POL: 200,000+	POL: Platinum
Supernova	Released: 23 November 1998; Label: BMG Poland; Formats: CD, CS	—	POL: 100,000+	POL: Platinum
Udar	Released: 26 April 2001; Label: BMG Poland; Formats: CD	9		
Dziś już wiem	Released: 9 April 2010; Label: Magic Records; Formats: CD, digital download	8	POL: 15,000+	POL: Gold
Eony Snu	Released: 27 August 2013; Label: Universal Music Poland; Formats: CD, digital download	29		
"—" denotes a recording that did not chart or was not released in that territory.

=== Compilation albums ===
Title	Album details	Peak chart positions	Sales	Certifications
Title	Album details	POL	Sales	Certifications
The Best of Urszula & Budka Suflera	Released: 1988; Label: Rock Studio New York; Formats: CD, CS	—		
Best of Budka Suflera & Urszula	Released: 1992; Label: TA Music; Formats: CD, CS	—		
Greatest Hits of Urszula	Released: 1992; Label: Rock Studio; Formats: CD, CS	—		
The Best	Released: 18 June 2002; Label: BMG Poland; Formats: CD	3	POL: 17,500+	POL: Gold
Gwiazdy XX wieku: Urszula, największe przeboje, część 1	Released: 5 July 2004; Label: BMG Poland; Formats: CD	—		
Gwiazdy XX wieku: Urszula, największe przeboje, część 2	Released: 5 July 2004; Label: BMG Poland; Formats: CD	—		
Wielki odlot 2 – Najlepsze 80-te	Released: 27 May 2014; Label: Universal Music Poland; Formats: CD, digital download	—		
"—" denotes a recording that did not chart or was not released in that territory.

=== Live albums ===
Title	Album details	Sales	Certifications
Urszula akustycznie	Released: 6 December 1996; Label: Zic Zac; Formats: CD, CS	POL: 200,000+	POL: Platinum
