= Machina (magazine) =

Polish music magazine

- Editor-in-chief: Piotr Metz
- Categories: Music magazine
- Frequency: Monthly
- Publisher: PMPG Polskie Media
- Founded: 1995
- Country: Poland
- Language: Polish
- ISSN: 1426-2312

Machina was a monthly music magazine published in Poland between from 1995 to 2002, and from 2006 to 2012. The title was subsequently reduced to a website but ultimately ceased activity in 2015.

== History ==
The magazine began activity in 1995 and its founder was Marek Kościkiewicz, one of the members of a popular Polish pop rock group De Mono. The first editor-in-chief was Andrzej Sienkiewicz, later replaced by Bogna Świątkowska and Marcin Prokop. Its contributors included Grzegorz Brzozowicz, Paweł Dunin-Wąsowicz, Rafał Bryndal, Daniel Wyszogrodzki, and musician Kazik Staszewski, among others. Machina was regarded Polish equivalent of the Rolling Stone magazine, covering popular culture, including music, film and literature. Between 1997 and 2000, every issue included a promotional CD. The magazine went out of circulation in 2002, and in 2005, the title was bought by the publisher PMPG Polskie Media with the intention to relaunch Machina. The reboot issue was published in February 2006 and featured an image of Madonna represented as the Holy Mary, with her daughter Lourdes pictured as Baby Jesus. It caused controversy and attracted criticism for defacing religious imagery. The new editor-in-chief was a Polish journalist Piotr Metz. In 2011, Machina was redesigned as a weekly issued only in electronic form and in 2012, it was reduced to a website which ceased activity in 2015.
