= Kayax =

- Founded: 2001
- Founder: Kayah, Tomasz Grewiński
- Distributor(s): EMI Music Poland (POL), Warner Music Poland (POL)
- Genre: hip-hop, pop, pop rock
- Country of origin: Poland
- Location: Warsaw, Poland
- Official website: kayax.net

Kayax Production & Publishing Sp. z o.o. is an independent Polish entertainment company that operates a record label, music publisher, management and concert agency. It was founded by singer Kayah and her business partner, musician Tomasz Grewiński, in 2001 in Warsaw. Kayah was initially founded as a record label. In 2003, Kayax signed chillout duo 15 Minut Projekt and producer Envee.

Folk, hip-hop and rock acts have signed with Kayax. The label's best-selling artists include alternative singer Maria Peszek, jazz-pop singer Krzysztof Kiljański and folk pop band Zakopower, yielding albums certified Gold and Platinum in Poland.

== Artists ==
=== Current ===
- Artur Rojek (recording contract)
- Atom String Quartet (recording contract)
- Monika Brodka (recording contract and management)
- Urszula Dudziak (recording and management contract)
- Maria Peszek (management contract, formerly also recording contract)
- Marek Dyjak (recording and management contract)
- Mery Spolsky
- Fox (recording contract)
- Grabek (recording contract)
- HEY (recording and management contract)
- Krzysztof Zalewski (recording contract)
- June (recording and management contract)
- Kayah (recording and management contract)
- Loco Star (recording contract)
- Kasia Nosowska (recording and management contract)
- Patrick The Pan (recording and management contract)
- Sara Brylewska (recording contract)
- Skubas (recording and management contract)
- Andrzej Smolik (recording and management contract)
- Zakopower (recording and management contract)

=== Former ===
- 15 Minut Projekt (recording contract)
- Andrzej Bachleda (recording contract)
- Bisquit (recording contract)
- Benzyna (recording contract)
- Buldog (recording contract)
- Envee (recording contract)
- IncarNations (recording contract)
- Krzysztof Kiljański (recording contract)
- L.U.C (recording contract)
- Marcin Wyrostek (recording contract)
- Maja Kleszcz & IncarNations (recording contract)
- Mosqitoo (recording contract)
- Natalia Lubrano (recording contract)
- Novika (recording contract)
- Snowman (recording contract)
- Sofa (recording contract)
- Tatiana Okupnik (recording contract)
- Warsaw Village Band (recording contract)
