= Polish Society of the Phonographic Industry =

Polish trade organization

- Abbreviation: ZPAV
- Formation: 11 July 1991; 34 years ago
- Region served: Poland
- President: Andrzej Puczyński
- Website: zpav.pl

The Polish Society of the Phonographic Industry (Polish: Związek Producentów Audio-Video; ZPAV) is the trade organization that represents the interests of the music industry in Poland, and the Polish chapter of the International Federation of the Phonographic Industry (IFPI). Founded in 1991, it is authorised by the Polish Ministry of Culture and National Heritage to act as a copyright collective in the field of phonogram and videogram producers' rights. ZPAV publishes the Polish Music Charts and awards music recording sales certifications. It also issues the Fryderyk annual award for Polish music.

== History ==
ZPAV was officially founded on 11 July 1991, following the recognition of the IFPI given in June of that year. In February 1995, ZPAV was authorised by the Polish Ministry of Culture to act as a rights management organisation in the field of phonogram and videogram producers' rights. This was followed in December with the right to collect a share of the 3% blank media tax, in the name of the producers.

The year 1995 also marked the beginning of awarding music awards by ZPAV. The first gold and platinum awards were granted by ZPAV in February 1995. The Fryderyk annual award was presented for the first time in March.

In 1996, ZPAV started signing agreements about collecting commissions for the broadcasting of sound recordings. Agreements with Telewizja Polska and the main commercial radio stations were signed in 1997 and with Polskie Radio in 1999. Agreements with other commercial premises where music is played were signed starting in 2002. Commissions were first distributed to the producers in 1998.

In 1998, together with the Foundation for the Protection of Audiovisual Works (Polish: Fundacja Ochrony Twórczości Audiowizualnej, FOTA) and the Business Software Alliance (BSA), ZPAV found the Anti-Piracy Coalition.

In 2000, ZPAV published the first official Polish record chart, OLiS. Airplay monitoring starts when an agreement with Nielsen Music Control is signed in 2006.

== Sales charts ==
ZPAV publishes two official album charts, OLiS, a weekly chart based on retail sales data, and Top 100, a monthly chart based on data received from the album companies. It also publishes the Official Polish Airplay Chart, provided by Nielsen Music Control Airplay Services and charts of songs most listened to in stores and discothèques.

== Certifications and awards ==
=== Sales certifications ===
ZPAV certifies sales of albums, singles and videos, for media sold from 1993. It awards Gold, Platinum and Diamond certifications, and as of January 2025, the number of units or revenue required for certification is as follows:

Certification levels as of January 2025
Variant		Gold	Platinum	Diamond
Album	Pop	15,000	30,000	150,000
Album	Classical/Jazz/Blues/Traditional	5,000	10,000	50,000
Album	Soundtrack	10,000	20,000	100,000
Single		125,000 zł	250,000 zł	1,000,000 zł

For albums, sales may include both physical units and digital revenue. For sales made before March 2017, 10 digital downloads (including ringtones) or 2,500 streams of any track from the album count as one album sale. Starting in March 2017, revenue of 35 zł equates to one album unit. Additionally, each vinyl record sold counts as 2.5 units.

For singles, only those released from 2015 onward are eligible. For single sales before March 2017, 250 streams counted as one single download, but no specific revenue per download was provided, nor was a unit-based threshold defined. Starting in March 2017, only the revenue criterion applies.

An archive of all the certifications awarded by ZPAV is available at the website.

==== History of certification ====
The first gold and platinum awards were granted by ZPAV in February 1995. A gold award went to Marysia Biesiadna by Maryla Rodowicz and platinum to Three Tenors Live by The Three Tenors. The diamond award was first presented in July 2000 to Kayah i Bregović by Serbian musician Goran Bregović and Polish singer Kayah.

Prior to April 1997, the threshold for pop albums was 100,000 units for gold, 200,000 for platinum and 1,000,000 for diamond, with reduced thresholds (50,000/100,000/500,000) for international repertoires. In April 1997, the thresholds for domestic repertoire were reduced to the ones for international records, and the thresholds were set as follows:

Original certification levels, c. 2001
Variant		Gold	Platinum	Diamond
Album	Pop	50,000	100,000	500,000
Album	Classical/Jazz	10,000	20,000	100,000
Single		10,000	20,000	100,000
Video	Pop	5,000	10,000	50,000
Video	Classical/Jazz	2,500	5,000	25,000

Certifications was done by categories. It included a separate category for singles, up to 30 minutes (reduced to 20 minutes in 2014) and no more than four songs, and maxi-singles, more than 30 minutes in length and between three and five songs. Separate categories existed for multi-disc box sets and multi-disc video boxes. Originally, each media piece was counted separately, but this practice was cancelled in February 2013. It also included a separate video single category, for media with playing time of up to 15 minutes, which was genre-independent, with thresholds of 5,000/10,000/50,000.

The first change in the certifications occurred in June 2002. Pop album thresholds were reduced to 35,000/70,000/350,000, and Class/Jazz to 5,000/10,000/50,000. A "Soundtrack" category was introduced, with thresholds of 10,000/20,000/100,000 and a separate genre-independent DVD category was added, with thresholds of 5,000 for Gold, 10,000 for Platinum and no Diamond award. Reduced thresholds for foreign repertoire were introduced in June 2004. The thresholds for foreign repertoire were set at 20,000/40,000/200,000 for Gold/Platinum/Diamond. At the same time, a classical-popular album category was introduced, with thresholds of 10,000/20,000/100,000.

In June 2006, the thresholds for pop albums were reduced again, for the final time, as of 2021. Domestic repertoire requirements were set to 15,000/30,000/150,000 and foreign repertoire were set to 10,000/20,000/100,000. However, this change was applied only for albums released from July 2005 onwards.

Following these change, the thresholds remained the same for a longer period, with changes only in the rules and categories of certifications. The DVD category was merged with the video category in January 2008. Following this, digital sales for albums, including ringtones and mastertones, was recognized in September 2010, with streaming included in April 2014.

In June 2015, the certification rules were greatly simplified. The separate thresholds for albums released before July 2005 were canceled, the video single category was removed and the multi-disc categories were merge into the single-disc categories. Digital sales for singles were introduced in August 2015, including streaming. Revenue thresholds were introduced in March 2017, and the categories for single and maxi-single were merged. The next change was increasing the thresholds for singles in August 2021. Prior to the change, the thresholds were 10,000/20,000 zł for Gold, 20,000/40,000 zł for Platinum and 100,000/200,000 zł for Diamond, and the change more than doubled these requirements. The number of units required for certification, as of 1 August 2021, was as follows:

Certification levels as of 1 August 2021
Variant			Gold	Platinum	Diamond
Album	Pop	Foreign	10,000	20,000	100,000
Album	Pop	Domestic	15,000	30,000	150,000
Album	Classical/Jazz/Blues/Traditional		5,000	10,000	50,000
Album	Soundtrack		10,000	20,000	100,000
Single			25,000/50,000 zł	50,000/100,000 zł	250,000/500,000 zł
Video	Pop		5,000	10,000	50,000
Video	Classical/Jazz/Blues/Traditional		2,500	5,000	25,000

Sales may include both physical units and digital sales. For albums sales made before March 2017, 10 digital downloads (including ringtones) or 2,500 streams of any track of the album count as one album sale. For albums sales starting March 2017, revenue of 20 zł count as an album unit. For singles sales before March 2017, one digital download (including ringtones) or 250 streams or any revenue of 2 zł count as a single. For single sales starting March 2017, only the revenue criterion hold.

The next change in certification came in January 2025, simplifying the format considerably. First, the Foreign and Domestic thresholds for albums were unified at the former domestic level. The revenue requirement for a digital album was raised to 35 zł, and a new rule for vinyl record sales was introduced, equating each album sold to 2.5 units. The threshold for singles was based solely on revenue and significantly increased. Finally, video certifications were discontinued.

=== The Fryderyk ===
The Fryderyk is the annual award in Polish music. Its status in the Polish public can be compared to the US Grammy and the British BRIT Award. The Fryderyk was established by ZPAV in 1994 and presented for the first time in 1995. Since 1999, nominees and winners have been selected by the Phonographic Academy (Polish: Akademia Fonograficzna) which was founded by the General Assembly of ZPAV in 1998 and now consists of nearly 1000 artists, creators, journalists. Since 2007 it is organized by STX Records.

=== Digital Song of the Year ===
Since 2010, ZPAV also awards a "Digital Song of the Year" award, which is awarded to the best selling digital song in two categories, Polish songs and foreign songs. The 2010 winners (for sales in 2009) were the Polish "Nie mogę Cię zapomnieć" by Agnieszka Chylińska and the foreign "Womanizer" by Britney Spears. The 2011 winners (for sales in 2010) were the Polish "Nie pytaj mnie" by Ala Boratyn and the foreign "Waka waka" by Shakira.

== See also ==
- List of music recording certifications
