= Fryderyk =

Polish music award show

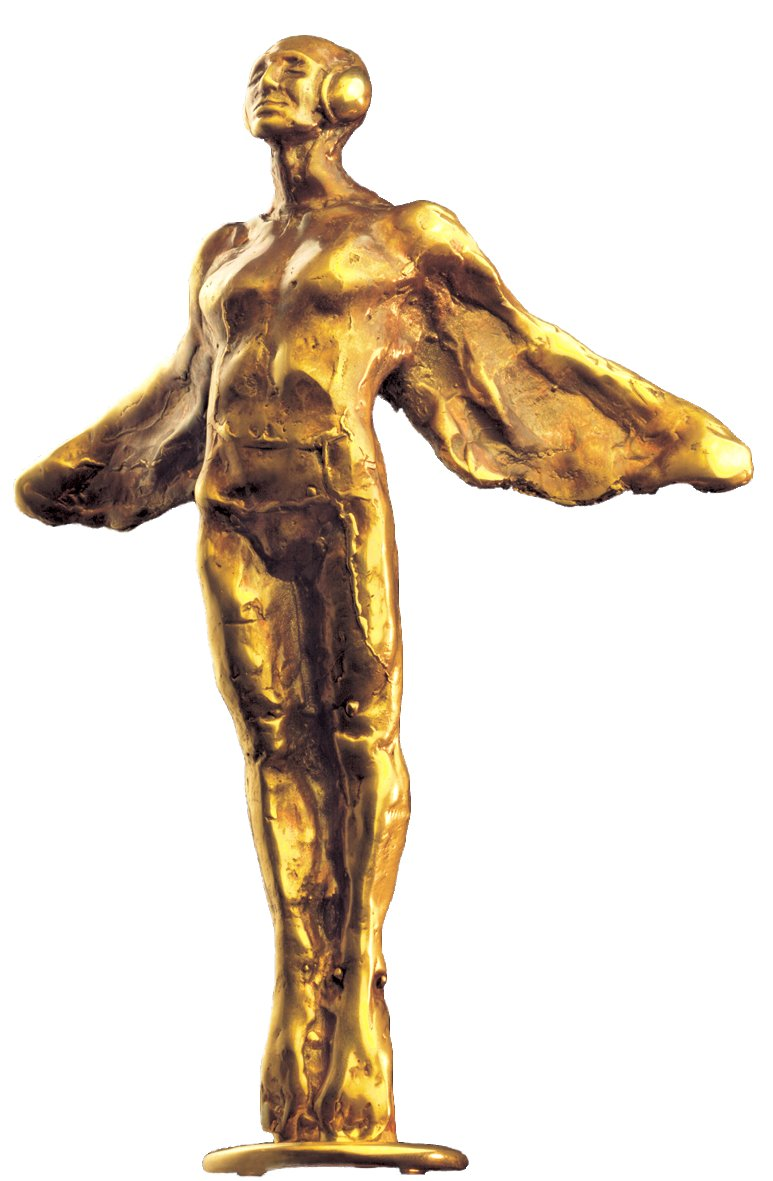
- The Fryderyk statuette
- Awarded for: Achievements in music
- Country: Poland
- Presented by: ZPAV's Phonographic Academy
- First award: March 19, 1995; 31 years ago
- Website: fryderyki.pl

Television/radio coverage
- Network: TVP (18 editions); TVN (5 editions); TV Puls (1 edition)

The Fryderyk is the annual award in Polish music. Its name refers to the original Polish spelling variant of Polish composer Frédéric Chopin's first name. Its status in the Polish public can be compared to the US Grammy and British BRIT Award. Officially created in 1994 and presented for the first time in 1995, the award was initially conferred by the Polish Society of the Phonographic Industry (Związek Producentów Audio-Video, ZPAV). Since 1999, nominees and winners have been selected by a body called Phonographic Academy (Akademia Fonograficzna) which by now consists of nearly 1000 artists, journalists and music industry professionals. Voting is anonymous and takes place in two rounds: In the first round, all Academy members can nominate five artists in each category, in the second round, members can vote for one candidate in each category from the most successful nominees established in the first round.

The Fryderyk statuette is reminiscent of the Academy Awards' "Oscar", but with wings, arms stretched backwards, and with headphones. The statuette was designed and created by Dorota Dziekiewicz-Pilich.

== Categories ==
The categories in which Fryderyk awards are presented have been steadily extended and modified since its inception in 1994. There are three main sections – popular music, classical music, and jazz. At present (2010) the following categories are used:

=== Popular music ===
- Best Music Production
- Best Album Design
- Composer of the Year
- Author of the Year
- Best Foreign Album
- Album of the Year – Folk/World Music
- Album of the Year – Sung Poetry
- Album of the Year – Rock
- Album of the Year – Blues
- Album of the Year – Heavy Metal
- Album of the Year – Club Music
- Album of the Year – Hip-Hop/R&B
- Album of the Year – Alternative
- Album of the Year – Pop
- New Face of Fonography
- Group of the Year
- Female Vocalist of the Year
- Male Vocalist of the Year
- Video of the Year
- Song of the Year

=== Classical music ===
- Best Choral and Oratorias Music Album
- Best Early and Baroque Music Album
- Best Chamber Music Album
- Best Symphonic and Concerto Music Album
- Best Solo Music Album
- Best Contemporary Music Album
- Best Vocal Recital Music Album
- Best Opera, Operetta and Ballet Music Album
- Best Debut Album
- Composer of the Year
- Most Outstanding Polish Music Recording

=== Jazz ===
- Album of the Year
- New Act of the Year
- Act of the Year

== Most successful artists ==
As of 2009, the most successful artists in the ten-year-history of the Fryderyks are (nominations and awards for 2009 that never included):

=== Popular music ===
1. Kasia Nosowska (of Hey): 21 awards, 53 nominations,
2. Grzegorz Ciechowski (of Republika): 11 awards, 24 nominations,
3. Kayah: 8 awards, 32 nominations,
4. Grzegorz Turnau: 8 awards, 19 nominations,
5. Myslovitz: 7 awards, 30 nominations,
6. Raz, Dwa, Trzy: 7 awards, 17 nominations,
7. Ania Dąbrowska: 7 awards, 15 nominations

Note: Awards for individual artists may include awards for their groups and vice versa.

=== Classical music ===
1. Warsaw National Philharmonic Orchestra: 5 awards, 22 nominations,
2. Sinfonia Varsovia: 5 awards, 22 nominations,
3. Janusz Olejniczak: 5 awards, 12 nominations,
4. Jerzy Maksymiuk: 4 awards, 12 nominations,
5. Jadwiga Rappé: 4 awards, 9 nominations.

=== Jazz ===
1. Tomasz Stańko: 8 awards + Golden Fryderyk, 9 nominations,
2. Marcin Wasilewski (pianist): 6 awards, 8 nominations,
3. Piotr Wojtasik: 2 awards, 6 nominations,
4. Andrzej Jagodzinski: 2 awards, 4 nominations,
5. Henryk Miśkiewicz: 1 award, 8 nominations.
6. Jarek Śmietana: 1 award, 6 nominations.

=== Best foreign album ===
This category is particularly interesting as it reflects the Polish public's reception of international artists. The award was last given out in 2012 and the awardees were:

- 1994: Pink Floyd – The Division Bell
- 1995: Queen – Made in Heaven
- 1996: George Michael – Older
- 1997: Rolling Stones – Bridges To Babylon
- 1998: Madonna – Ray of Light
- 1999: Santana – Supernatural
- 2000: U2 – All That You Can't Leave Behind
- 2001: Leonard Cohen – Ten New Songs
- 2002: Red Hot Chili Peppers – By the Way
- 2003: Dido – Life for Rent
- 2004: Prince – Musicology
- 2005: Coldplay – X&Y
- 2006: Red Hot Chili Peppers – Stadium Arcadium
- 2008: Foo Fighters – Echoes, Silence, Patience & Grace
- 2009: Erykah Badu – New Amerykah Part One (4th World War)
- 2010: Alice in Chains – Black Gives Way to Blue
- 2011: Kings of Leon – Come Around Sundown
- 2012: Adele – 21
- 2019: Greta Van Fleet – Anthem of the Peaceful Army

== See also ==
- Music of Poland
- List of Polish music artists
