= Bitwa na głosy =

Polish television series

- Created by: Mastiff Media Polska
- Presented by: Hubert Urbański
- Judges: Zbigniew Zamachowski, Sonia Bohosiewicz, Alicja Węgorzewska
- Country of origin: Poland
- No. of seasons: 3

Original release
- Network: TVP2
- Release: 5 March 2011 – 10 November 2012

Bitwa na głosy (English: Clash of the Choirs) is a Polish light entertainment reality television series broadcast by TVP2. Choir members were selected in open auditions held in each city with the celebrity officiating.

== Cast ==
=== Presenters ===
Presenters	Role	Seasons		
Presenters	Role	1	2	3
Piotr Kędzierski	Host	♦	♦	♦
Hubert Urbański	Host	♦	♦	♦
Agnieszka Szulim	Host		♦	♦

=== Judges ===
Judges	Seasons		
Judges	1	2	3
Wojciech Jagielski	♦		♦
Alicja Węgorzewska	♦	♦	♦
Katarzyna Zielińska			♦
Tomasz Pukacki			♦
Grażyna Szapołowska	♦		
Sonia Bohosiewicz		♦	
Zbigniew Zamachowski		♦	

== Seasons ==
Season	# of Stars	# of Weeks	Season premiere Date	Season finale Date	Winner	Runner-up	Third place	Other contestants (in order from 4th to last place)
Season 1 – Spring 2011	8	10	March 5, 2011	May 7, 2011	Piotr Kupicha	Urszula Dudziak	Halina Młynkowa	Maciej Miecznikowski, Paweł Golec & Łukasz Golec, Natasza Urbańska, Michał Wiśniewski, Krzysztof Cugowski
Season 2 – Spring 2012	8	10	March 3, 2012	May 5, 2012	Kamil Bednarek	Ryszard Rynkowski	Mezo	Janusz Panasewicz, Monika Kuszyńska, Edyta Górniak, Natalia Kukulska, Natalia Przybysz & Paulina Przybysz
Season 3 – Autumn 2012	8	10	8 September 2012	10 November 2012	Andrzej Piaseczny	Ewa Farna	Liber	Piotr Rubik, Jula, Tomasz Lach & Aleksander Milwiw-Baron, Beata Kozidrak, Robert Gawliński

== Season 1 ==
=== Teams ===
Celebrity	TOP 16	City	Audition	Status
Krzysztof Cugowski	Patrycja Handiuk, Amanda Lepusińska, Marta Maliszewska, Grzegorz Matysiak, Anna Sokołek, Łukasz Wójcik, Malwina Masternak, Marta Paszkowska, Natalia Glińska, Olga Kwiatkowska, Grzegorz Kaproń, Kaja Tyzenhauz, Natalia Wilk, Mateusz Mika, Paulina Maciejczyk, Paweł Łaban	Lublin	16 February	Eliminated 1st on March 19, 2011
Michał Wiśniewski	Aleksandra Sobiech, Sebastian Wojtczak, Daniel Mateja, Angelika Kurowska, Waldemar Wiśniewski, Mateusz Stachura, Paweł Bauer, Mariusz Ruta, Natalia Jarosławska, Agata Barwinek, Justyna Panfilewicz, Łukasz Handzel, Małgorzata Balcerzak, Magdalena Kusiak, Kamil Kałuża, Janette Vik	Łódź	31 January	Eliminated 2nd on March 26, 2011
Natasza Urbańska	Aleksandra Kościucha, Ilona Rojewska Błocka, Jarosław Jakubiec, Ewa Szlachcic, Paweł Orłowski, Malwina Kalińska, Olga Barej, Angelika Chwyć, Adam Milczarczyk, Marta Dryll, Tomasz Krupa, Sylwia Przetak, Ada Piotrowska, Dominika Korczak, Kamil Jaros, Martyna Welenc	Warsaw	26 January	Eliminated 3rd on April 2, 2011
Paweł Golec & Łukasz Golec	Julia Miesiączek, Piotr Roman, Anna Biegun, Agnieszka Kmiecik, Karolina Piątek, Marcin Piątek, Justyna Janik, Aicha Słoniec, Sylwia Zelek, Bogna Golec, Eliza Kania, Magdalena Kieca, Evelina Rivillo, Natalia Sołtysek, Seani Hurley, Joanna Smajdor	Milówka	12 February	Eliminated 4th on April 9, 2011
Maciej Miecznikowski	Anna Judycka Muszyńska, Dorota Theisenbach, Weronika Korthals, Justyna Piepke, Marcin Molendowski, Karol Jasiński, Jarosław Gawryś, Katarzyna Aszyk, Marcin Słabowski, Tomasz Fopke, Kamila Kropkowska, Piotr Starzecki, Monika Markiewicz, Joanna Kozak, Karolina Żuk, Anna Pryłowska	Gdynia	15 January	Eliminated 5th on April 16, 2011
Halina Młynkowa	Katarzyna Materna, Helena Pipień, Zdzisław Baguda, Karolina Grynkiewicz, Justyna Hubczyk, Ewa Kapała, Mateusz Wróbel, Martyna Franek, Marcin Zmorzyński, Andrzej Kaczyński, Karolina Kidoń, Lena Czechowicz, Karolina Andrzejewska, Hanna Hołek, Roman Sajewicz, Tomasz Sajewicz	Cieszyn	9 February	Third Place on April 30, 2011
Urszula Dudziak	Maciej Sławny, Dominik Fijałkowski, Artur Caturian, Aneta Thiele, Klaudia Tyszkiewicz, Marcin Pawelec, Karol Dziedzic, Jadwiga Macewicz, Łukasz Iwaniec, Natalia Iwaniec, Zofia Klimkowska, Mariusz Wawrzyńczyk, Monika Kręt, Paulina Gołębiowska, Mateusz Pollun, Małgorzata Hryniewicz	Zielona Góra	20 February	Second Place on May 7, 2011
Piotr Kupicha	Wioletta Lubina, Lucyna Labryga, Mirek Lazarek, Katarzyna Grabowska, Agnieszka Adamczewska, Bogusława Czekiel, Mateusz Piecowski, Tomasz Wołkiewicz, Joanna Kaszta, Magdalena Meisel, Karolina Sumowska, Sara Kurzyńska, Marcin Weideman, Agata Wyszyńska, Marcin Mazu	Katowice	23 January	Winners on May 7, 2011

=== Episodes ===
==== Week 1 ====
Running order

Team	Music	Result
Piotr Kupicha	Czesław Niemen - "Dziwny jest ten świat"	
Urszula Dudziak	Beyoncé - "Single Ladies"	1st Place
Natasza Urbańska	Michael Jackson - "Thriller"	
Michał Wiśniewski	Ich Troje - "Keine Grenzen"	

==== Week 2 ====
- Group Performance: Rihanna - "Don't Stop The Music"
- Top 4 Teams Performance:

Team	Music	Result
Paweł Golec & Łukasz Golec	The Rolling Stones - "(I Can't Get No) Satisfaction"	
Krzysztof Cugowski	Aretha Franklin - "Respect"	
Maciej Miecznikowski	Seal - "Kiss From A Rose"	
Halina Młynkowa	Shakira - "Waka Waka (This Time for Africa)"	1st Place

==== Week 3 ====
- Group Performance:
- Top 8 Teams Performance:

Team	Music	Result
Urszula Dudziak	Amy Winehouse - "Rehab"	Immunitet
Maciej Miecznikowski	Madonna - "Like a Prayer"	
Krzysztof Cugowski	Guns N' Roses - "Paradise City"	Eliminated
Michał Wiśniewski	Kult - "Gdy nie ma dzieci"	
Paweł Golec & Łukasz Golec	Vaya Con Dios - "Nah Neh Nah"	2nd Place
Natasza Urbańska	Lady Gaga - "Bad Romance"	
Piotr Kupicha	Queen - "We Will Rock You"	3rd Place
Halina Młynkowa	Leonard Cohen - "Hallelujah"	1st Place & Immunitet

==== Week 4 ====
- Group Performance: U2
- Top 7 Teams Performance:

Team	Music	Result
Paweł Golec & Łukasz Golec	Golec uOrkiestra - "Crazy is My Life"	6th Place
Halina Młynkowa	Toto - "Africa"	1st Place
Maciej Miecznikowski	Queen - "Bohemian Rhapsody"	
Urszula Dudziak	Jackson 5 - "I Want You Back"	2nd Place
Michał Wiśniewski	Scorpions - "Send Me An Angel" (Polish version)	Eliminated
Natasza Urbańska	Bobby McFerrin - "Don't Worry, Be Happy"	
Piotr Kupicha	Kings of Leon - "Use Somebody"	3rd Place

==== Week 5 ====
- Group Performance: Beyoncé - "Crazy in Love"
- Top 6 Teams Performance:

Team	Music	Result
Piotr Kupicha	Robert Gawliński - "Nie stało się nic"	4th Place
Natasza Urbańska	The Black Eyed Peas - "I Gotta Feeling"	Eliminated
Paweł Golec & Łukasz Golec	Jennifer Lopez - "Let's Get Loud"	5th Place
Urszula Dudziak	Tina Turner - "Proud Mary"	2nd Place
Maciej Miecznikowski	The Weather Girls - "It's Raining Men"	3rd Place
Halina Młynkowa	Christina Aguilera - "Candyman"	1st Place

==== Week 6 ====
- Group Performance: Robbie Williams - "Let Me Entertain You"
- Top 5 Teams Performance:

Team	Music	Result
Paweł Golec & Łukasz Golec	Michael Jackson - "Black or White"	Eliminated
Maciej Miecznikowski	Anna Jantar - "Nic nie może wiecznie trwać"	2nd Place
Urszula Dudziak	Justin Timberlake - "Lovestoned"	3rd Place
Piotr Kupicha	Feel - "Jak Anioła Głos"	4th Place
Halina Młynkowa	Pussycat Dolls & A. R. Rahman - "Jai Ho"	1st Place

==== Week 7 ====
- Group Performance: Republika - "Biała Flaga"
- Top 4 Teams Performance:

Team	Music	Result
Maciej Miecznikowski	Lou Bega - "Mambo No. 5"	Eliminated
Maciej Miecznikowski	Shakira - "Whenever, Wherever"	Eliminated
Halina Młynkowa	Brathanki - "Czerwone Korale"	3rd Place
Halina Młynkowa	Afromental - "Rock&Rollin' Love"	3rd Place
Urszula Dudziak	Britney Spears - "Toxic"	1st Place
Urszula Dudziak	Kayah - "Tesosteron"	1st Place
Piotr Kupicha	The Eagles - "Hotel California"	2nd Place
Piotr Kupicha	Madonna - "Hung Up"	2nd Place

==== Week 8 ====
- Group Performance:
- Top 3 Teams Performance:

Team	Music	Result
Urszula Dudziak	James Brown - "I Got You (I Feel Good)"	3rd Place
Urszula Dudziak	Whitney Houston & Mariah Carey - "When You Believe"	3rd Place
Piotr Kupicha	Foreigner - "I Want to Know What Love Is"	1st Place
Piotr Kupicha	Melanie Fiona - "Monday Morning"	1st Place
Halina Młynkowa	Josh Groban - "You Raise Me Up"	2nd Place
Halina Młynkowa	ABBA - "Mamma Mia"	2nd Place

==== Week 9 ====
- Group Performance: Reel 2 Real - "I Like to Move It", Andrea Bocelli - "Time to Say Goodbye"
- Top 3 Teams Performance:

Team	Music	Result
Halina Młynkowa	Adele - "Rolling in the Deep"	Eliminated
Halina Młynkowa	Shania Twain - "Man! I Feel Like A Woman"	Eliminated
Urszula Dudziak	Earth, Wind & Fire - "September"	1st Place
Urszula Dudziak	Bill Medley & Jennifer Warnes - "(I've Had) The Time of My Life"	1st Place
Piotr Kupicha	Dżem - "Autsajder"	Immunitet
Piotr Kupicha	The Rembrandts - "I'll Be There For You"	Immunitet

==== Week 10 ====
- Group Performance: Gloria Gaynor - "I Will Survive", Bon Jovi - "It's My Life"
- Top 2 Teams Performance:

Team	Music	Result
Piotr Kupicha	Village People - "Y.M.C.A."	1st Place
Piotr Kupicha	Bajm - "Biała Armia"	1st Place
Urszula Dudziak	Ricky Martin - "She Bangs"	2nd Place
Urszula Dudziak	Christina Aguilera & Lil' Kim & Mýa & Pink & Missy Elliott - "Lady Marmalade"	2nd Place

- Top 8 Teams Performance:

Team	Music	Result
Krzysztof Cugowski	Marek Grechuta - "Dni, których nie znamy"	-
Michał Wiśniewski	Starlight Express - "Light at the End of Tunnel"	-
Natasza Urbańska	Ricky Martin - "Livin' la Vida Loca"	-
Paweł Golec & Łukasz Golec	Celine Dion - "My Heart Will Go On"	-
Maciej Miecznikoski	John Travolta & Olivia Newton-John - You're The One That I Want	-
Halina Młynkowa	Pink - "So What"	-

=== Weekly results ===
The order is based on viewer votes.

Order	Week 1	Week 2	Week 3	Week 4	Week 5	Week 6	Week 7	Week 8	Week 9	Week 10 Final
1	Urszula Dudziak	Halina Młynkowa	Halina Młynkowa	Halina Młynkowa	Halina Młynkowa	Halina Młynkowa	Halina Młynkowa	Piotr Kupicha	Urszula Dudziak	Piotr Kupicha
2	-	-	Paweł Golec & Łukasz Golec	Urszula Dudziak	Urszula Dudziak	Maciej Miecznikowski	Piotr Kupicha	Halina Młynkowa		Urszula Dudziak
3	-	-	Piotr Kupicha	Piotr Kupicha	Maciej Miecznikowski	Urszula Dudziak	Halina Młynkowa	Urszula Dudziak		
4	Piotr Kupicha; Michał Wiśniewski; Natasza Urbańska	Maciej Miecznikowski; Paweł Golec & Łukasz Golec; Krzysztof Cugowski	Urszula Dudziak; Michał Wiśniewski; Natasza Urbańska; Maciej Miecznikowski	Paweł Golec & Łukasz Golec; Maciej Miecznikowski; Natasza Urbańska	Paweł Golec & Łukasz Golec; Piotr Kupicha	Piotr Kupicha				
Eliminated	-	-	Krzysztof Cugowski	Michał Wiśniewski	Natasza Urbańska	Paweł Golec & Łukasz Golec	Maciej Miecznikowski		Halina Młynkowa	

== Season 2 ==
=== Teams ===
Celebrity	TOP 16	City	Audition	Status
Paulina Przybysz and Natalia Przybysz	Kamil Milczarek, Wiktoria Księżopolska, Patrycja Ciska, Anna Książkiewicz, Matylda Stanejko, Paulina Szarek, Elżbieta Bogdańska, Paula Kułakowska, Anna Wołoszyn, Paweł Izdebski, Filip Rychcik, Kinga Švagždys, Marcin Kamiński, Martyna Jaskulska, Sławek Ramian	Warsaw	14 February	Eliminated 1st on March 17, 2012
Natalia Kukulska	Dominik Skrzyniarz, Martyna Budnik, Klaudia Frączek, Jakub Jurzyk, Katarzyna Dereń, Star Kochańska, Piotr Zubek, Monika Niedek, Kamil Krupicz, Iwona Kmiecik, Agata Kusmierczyk, Yasmin Schancer, Michalina Brudnowska, Agnieszka Zawidzka-Rynduch, Paweł Skiba, Agata Świtała- Rutkowska	Warsaw	5 February	Eliminated 2nd on March 24, 2012
Edyta Górniak	Agnieszka Brzezina, Wioleta Gomółka, Magdalena Dłubak, Kamila Dybowska, Piotr Hulin, Katarzyna Patrzałek, Hanna Markiewicz, Piotr Jurkowski, Krzysztof Graca, Katarzyna Danek, Zofia Kubiak, Aleksandra Gadzińska, Dawid Brzozowski, Szymon Sadowski, Aneta Rudkowska, Iga Kozacka	Opole	20 January	Eliminated 3rd on March 31, 2012
Monika Kuszyńska	Anna Biskupska, Małgorzata Stec, Anna Frontczak, Magdalena Klonowicz, Monika Mioduszewska, Sylwia Wysocka, Justyna Krzyczmanik, Jan Ryngajłło, Jędrzej Olżewski, Martyna Konieczna, Kacper Andrzejewski, Estera Wrona, Katarzyna Kamerska, Joanna Świniarska, Daria Bienias i Daniel Kwapisiewicz	Łódź	18 February	Eliminated 4th on April 7, 2012
Janusz Panasewicz	Beata Just, Arkadiusz Szulc, Marta Ulikowska, Eliza Szylow, Sebastian Łukaszuk, Aleksandra Steckiewicz, Katarzyna Mikucka, Anna Tomczak, Kinga Giedo, Karol Jankowski, Patrycja Ciborowska, Joanna Zubkowicz, Agnieszka Rucińska, Patrycja Makowska, Magdalena Nowosadko i Magda Jankowska	Olecko	14 January	Eliminated 5th on April 14, 2012
Mezo	Patrycja Michalczak, Szczepan Rączkowski, Ewa Urban, Emilia Ziegler, Maria Taciak, Rafał Sekulak, Monika Palmowska, Agata Śliwińska, Witold Ostynowicz, Dorota Lembicz, Zbyszko Tuchołka, Mariusz Urbaniak, Marcelina Woźna, John James, Beata Andrzejewska, Kasia Rościńska	Poznań		Third Place on April 28, 2012
Ryszard Rynkowski	Monika Rygasiewicz, Daria Sankowska, Monika Kowalczyk, Paulina Hebel, Łukasz Gesek, Katarzyna Czoska, Małgorzata Miklaszewska, Tomasz Hoffmann, Maja Kadłubowska, Gabriel Bagiński, Agnieszka Lach, Milena Rachańska, Marta Gałuszewska, Piotr Jacyno, Filip Kamieniarz, Sandra Elminowska	Elbląg	17 January	Second Place on May 5, 2012
Kamil Bednarek	Martyna Gąsiorek, Paulina Lulek, Anna Deko, Kornela Bednarek, Monika Biczysko, Daniel Sierżant, Łukasz Sypień, Aleksandra Krzyżańska, Weronika Radzimowska, Wojciech Bałwako, Agnieszka Bisikirska, Nikola Warda, Karolina Mleczak, Damian Zając, Martyna Szymańska i Anna Mrożek	Brzeg	23 January	Winners on May 5, 2012

=== Episodes ===
==== Week 1 ====
- Musical Performance: Piotr Kupicha & TOP 4 Teams - "Pokaż na co Cię stać"
- Top 4 Teams Performance:

Team	Music	Result
Mezo	K'naan - "Wavin' Flag"	
Paulina Przybysz & Natalia Przybysz	Edyta Bartosiewicz - "Szał"	
Janusz Panasewicz	Madonna - "Material Girl"	
Edyta Górniak	Electric Light Orchestra - "Ticket to the Moon"	1st Place

==== Week 2 ====
- Group Performance: Gloria Estefan - "Conga"
- Top 4 Teams Performance:

Team	Music	Result
Ryszard Rynkowski	The Tokens - "The Lion Sleeps Tonight"	
Monika Kuszyńska	Adele - "Set Fire to the Rain"	
Natalia Kukulska	Michael Jackson - "Wanna Be Startin' Somethin'"	
Kamil Bednarek	U2 - "One"	1st Place

==== Week 3 ====
- Group Performance: Carmina Burana - "O Fortuna"
- Top 8 Teams Performance:

Team	Music	Result
Natalia Kukulska	Rihanna - "Only Girl (In the World)"	
Ryszard Rynkowski	Maroon 5 & Christina Aguilera - "Moves Like Jagger"	1st Place
Paulina Przybysz & Natalia Przybysz	Prince - "Musicology"	Eliminated
Janusz Panasewicz	Janis Joplin - "Piece of My Heart"	3rd Place
Monika Kuszyńska	Eternal - "I Wanna Be The Only One"	
Mezo	The Black Eyed Peas - "Where Is the Love?"	2nd Place
Kamil Bednarek	Louis Armstrong - "What a Wonderful World"	Immunitet
Edyta Górniak	Ivan i Delfin - "Jej czarne oczy"	Immunitet

==== Week 4 ====
- Group Performance: Duffy - "Mercy"
- Top 7 Teams Performance:

Team	Music	Result
Kamil Bednarek	Buena Vista Social Club - "Chan Chan"	2nd Place
Natalia Kukulska	Beyoncé - "Love on Top"	Eliminated
Janusz Panasewicz	Wilki - "Urke"	
Monika Kuszyńska	Andrzej Zaucha - "Byłaś serca biciem"	
Edyta Górniak	Whitney Houston - "My Love Is Your Love"	
Mezo	LMFAO - "Party Rock Anthem"	3rd Place
Ryszard Rynkowski	R. Kelly - "I Believe I Can Fly"	1st Place

==== Week 5 ====
- Group Performance: Piotr Rubik - "Niech mówią, że to nie jest miłość"
- Top 6 Teams Performance:

Team	Music	Result
Janusz Panasewicz	Metallica - "Nothing Else Matters"	
Ryszard Rynkowski	Stanisław Sojka - "Tolerancja"	1st Place
Kamil Bednarek	Marek Grechuta - "Nie dokazuj"	2nd Place
Monika Kuszyńska	Cee Lo Green - "Forget You"	
Edyta Górniak	Bryan Adams - "(Everything I Do) I Do It for You"	Eliminated
Mezo	Rihanna - "We Found Love"	3rd Place

==== Week 6 ====
- Group Performance: Tadeusz Woźniak - "Zegarmistrz światła", Michel Teló - "Ai Se Eu Te Pego"
- Top 5 Teams Performance:

Team	Music	Result
Monika Kuszyńska	Toto - "Hold The Line"	Eliminated
Kamil Bednarek	The Police - "Roxanne"	1st Place
Mezo	Bruno Mars - "The Lazy Song"	4th Place
Ryszard Rynkowski	Earth, Wind and Fire - "Boogie Wonderland"	2nd Place
Janusz Panasewicz	Lady Pank - "Zostawcie Titanica"	3rd Place

==== Week 7 ====
- Group Performance: The Black Eyed Peas - "Let's Get It Started"
- Top 4 Teams Performance:

Team	Music	Result
Mezo	Zakopower - "Boso"	3rd Place
Mezo	Boyz II Men - "End of the Road"	3rd Place
Ryszard Rynkowski	Tom Jones - "Sex Bomb"	2nd Place
Ryszard Rynkowski	Ryszard Rynkowski - "Szczęśliwej drogi już czas"	2nd Place
Kamil Bednarek	The Mamas & the Papas - "California Dreamin"	1st Place
Kamil Bednarek	Smash Mouth - "All Star"	1st Place
Janusz Panasewicz	Aerosmith - "Dude Looks Like A Lady"	Eliminated
Janusz Panasewicz	Czesław Niemen - "Wspomnienie"	Eliminated

==== Week 8 ====
- Group Performance: Oddział Zamknięty - "Party"
- Top 3 Teams Performance:

Team	Music	Result
Kamil Bednarek	No Doubt - "Don't Speak"	1st Place
Kamil Bednarek	Oasis - "Wonderwall"	1st Place
Ryszard Rynkowski	Joe Cocker - "Unchain My Heart"	2nd Place
Ryszard Rynkowski	Alicia Keys - "No One"	2nd Place
Mezo	Will Smith - "Men in Black"	3rd Place
Mezo	Mezo & Kasia Wilk - "Ważne"	3rd Place

==== Week 9 ====
- Group Performance: Kool and The Gang - "Celebration"
- Top 3 Teams Mix: Mezo - "Sacrum", Ryszard Rynkowski - "Dziewczyny lubią brąz", Kamil Bednarek - "Raz, dwa, w górę ręcę"
- Top 3 Teams Performance:

Team	Music	Result
Ryszard Rynkowski	Czerwone Gitary - "Nie zadzieraj nosa"	1st Place
Ryszard Rynkowski	Cyndi Lauper - "True Colors"	1st Place
Mezo	C+C Music Factory - "Everybody Dance Now"	Eliminated
Mezo	Queen - "We Are The Champions"	Eliminated
Kamil Bednarek	Max Romeo - "I Chase the Devil"	Immunitet
Kamil Bednarek	Red Hot Chili Peppers - "Under The Bridge"	Immunitet

==== Week 10 ====
- Group Performance (TOP 8): Bon Jovi - "It's My life", Michael Jackson - "Will You Be There"
- Top 2 Teams Performance:

Team	Music	Result
Kamil Bednarek	U2 - "With Or Without You"	1st Place
Kamil Bednarek	Michael Jackson - "Earth Song"	1st Place
Ryszard Rynkowski	Monty Python - "Always Look on the Bright Side of Life"	2nd Place
Ryszard Rynkowski	Dżem - "Sen o Victorii"	2nd Place

- Top 8 Teams Performance:

Team	Music	Result
Natalia Przybysz & Paulina Przybysz	Gotye & Kimbra - "Somebody That I Used to Know"	-
Janusz Panasewicz	Bajm - "Płynie w nas goraca krew"	-
Natalia Kukulska	Justin Timberlake - "Cry Me A River"	-
Monika Kuszyńska	Monika Kuszyńska - "Oceleni"	-
Edyta Górniak	Elvis Presley - "Blue Suede Shoes"	-
Mezo	Mietek Szcześniak - "O Niebo Lepiej"	-

=== Weekly results ===
The order is based on viewer votes.

Order	Week 1	Week 2	Week 3	Week 4	Week 5	Week 6	Week 7	Week 8	Week 9	Week 10 Final
1	Edyta Górniak	Kamil Bednarek	Ryszard Rynkowski	Ryszard Rynkowski	Ryszard Rynkowski	Kamil Bednarek	Kamil Bednarek	Kamil Bednarek	Ryszard Rynkowski	Kamil Bednarek
2	-	-	Mezo	Kamil Bednarek	Kamil Bednarek	Ryszard Rynkowski	Ryszard Rynkowski	Ryszard Rynkowski		Ryszard Rynkowski
3	-	-	Janusz Panasewicz	Mezo	Mezo	Janusz Panasewicz	Mezo	Mezo		
4	Mezo; Janusz Panasewicz; Paulina Przybysz & Natalia Przybysz	Ryszard Rynkowski; Natalia Kukulska; Monika Kuszyńska	Monika Kuszyńska; Natalia Kukulska	Monika Kuszyńska; Edyta Górniak; Janusz Panasewicz	Monika Kuszyńska; Janusz Panasewicz	Mezo				
Eliminated	-	-	Paulina Przybysz & Natalia Przybysz	Natalia Kukulska	Edyta Górniak	Monika Kuszyńska	Janusz Panasewicz		Mezo	

== Season 3 ==
=== Teams ===
Celebrity	TOP 16	City	Audition	Status
Robert Gawliński	Beata Burzyńska, Aneta Duszyńska, Aleksandra Sotomska, Patryk Komosa, Esmahan Sara Al-Shokliya, Konrad Rogala, Fryderyk Krajewski, Julia Węgrowicz, Aleksandra Niewęgłowska, Malwina Skowrońska, Andrzej Pawłowski, Izabela Sietejko, Paulina Wójtowicz, Kamil Muzal, Katarzyna Wojciechowska, Marcin Błądziński	Warsaw	25 July	Eliminated 1st on September 22, 2012
Beata Kozidrak	Ewa Kozik, Ilona Rybak, Gabriela Łakoma, Dawid Kowalski, Kacper Zubkowicz, Hassen Saidi, Kamila Witek, Paulina Majewska, Katarzyna Golecka, Agnieszka Wiechnik, Natalia Nejman, Justyna Tucka, Anna Zając, Martyna Merwa, Klaudia Drożdżyk, Bartłomiej Wiater	Lublin	22 August	Eliminated 2nd on September 29, 2012
Tomasz Lach & Aleksander Milwiw-Baron	Agnieszka Skrycka, Przemysław Kozicki, Beata Pankowska, Marta Jakubowska, Magdalena Banasiuk, Elżbieta Nagel, Joanna Sikorska, Mateusz Grędziński, Monika Urlik, Piotr Janik, Aleksandra Lach, Aleksandra Certa, Agata Grześkiewicz, Tamara Janicka, Piotr Dymała, Monika Dowgiałło	Olsztyn	17 July	Eliminated 3rd on October 6, 2012
Jula	Katarzyna Chudzik, Monika Kisiel, Edyta Choszczuk, Żaklina Olchowik, Justyna Krówczyńska, Jolanta Ostrowska, Dominika Dłużewska, Marc Mavambu a.k.a. Frenchy, Dominika Komarnicka, Urszula Dużyńska, Adam Kalinowski, Marlena Pieńkowska, Dawid Litwiński, Anna Gelstyan, Tomasz Wiśniewski, Karolina Grala	Łomża	6 August	Eliminated 4th on October 13, 2012
Piotr Rubik	Piotr Bolesta, Magda Moczyńska, Mateusz Jakubiec, Katarzyna Naumowicz, Karol Bąk, Ada Nasiadka, Paulina Sacharczuk, Kacper Tomczyk, Beata Dobosz, Barbara Gąsiennica-Giewont, Katarzyna Borowiecka, Marta Malinowska, Justyna Borkowska, Edyta Anna Paszkowska, Julia Bogdańska, Julia Kotowicz	Warsaw	25 August	Eliminated 5th on October 20, 2012
Liber	Maciej Kujama, Sonia Zając, Paulina Jeżewska, Karolina Dębińska, Monika Wieczorek, Marianna Ćwiąkała, Beata Stachowiak, Brajan Jankowski, Krzysztof Spychała, Jarek Mączyński, Joanna Gacek, Katarzyna Najderek, Ania Spławska, Marta Zaremba, Monika Żwawiak, Marta Szymanowska	Oborniki	28 July	Third Place on November 3, 2012
Ewa Farna	Patrycja Kępa, Konrad Cygal, Martyna Jelita, Przemysław Smolarski, Inez Bodio, Martyna Kowalczyk, Angelika Kurelowska, Damian Kulej, Rafał Matuszewski, Patrycja Śmieja, Anna Buczkowska, Adam Piernikarczyk, Eliza Wietrzyńska, Kamil Kubas, Ula Babecka, Angelika Szczepina	Sosnowiec	16 August	Second Place on November 10, 2012
Andrzej Piaseczny	Dominika Bałazińska, Marcelina Kopyt, Paweł Węgierek, Filip Wnuk, Klaudia Hendel, Łukasz Mojecki, Natalia Jakubowska, Małgorzata Nakonieczna, Patrycja Michalska, Paulina Tarasińska, Magdalena Kasperek, Magdalena Paradziej, Małgorzata Bieniek, Inga Ochinean, Klaudia Błaszczyk, Ewa Kotowska	Kielce	31 July	First Place on November 10, 2012

=== Episodes ===
==== Week 1 ====
- Group Performance: Irene Cara – "What A Feeling"
- Top 4 Teams Performance:

Order	Team	Song	Song	Result
1	Andrzej Piaseczny	"To co dobre"	"Hooray! Hooray! It's a Holi-Holiday"	Advanced
2	Afromental	"Rock&Rollin' Love"	"Bananowy Song"	Advanced
3	Piotr Rubik	"Niech mówią, że to nie jest miłość"	"Wake Me Up Before You Go-Go"	Advanced
4	Ewa Farna	"Nie przegap"	"Call Me Maybe"	Immunity

==== Week 2 ====
- Group Performance: Mickey & Sylvia - "Love is strange", Pitbull - "Back in Time"
- Top 4 Teams Performance:

Order	Team	Song	Song	Result
1	Beata Kozidrak	"O Tobie"	"Hey Ya!"	Advanced
2	Liber	"Czyste szaleństwo"	"Grenade"	Advanced
3	Robert Gawiliński	"Urke"	"In The Shadows"	Advanced
4	Jula	"Za Każdym Razem"	"I Gotta Feeling"	Immunity

==== Week 3 ====
- Group Performance: Bon Jovi - "It's My Life"
- Top 8 Teams Performance:

Order	Team	Song	Result
1	Piotr Rubik	"Rolling in the Deep"	3rd Place
2	Ewa Farna	"Stronger (What Doesn't Kill You)"	Immunity
3	Robert Gawiliński	"Ostatnia Nocka"	Eliminated
4	Jula	"I'll Be Missing You"	Immunity
5	Andrzej Piaseczny	"Somebody to Love" (Glee Version)	1st Place
6	Liber	"Parasolki" & "Umbrella"	2nd Place
7	Beata Kozidrak	"Rock DJ"	Advanced
8	Afromental	"Use Somebody"	Advanced

==== Week 4 ====
- Group Performance: Czesław Niemen - "Dziwny jest ten świat"
- Top 7 Teams Performance:

Order	Team	Song	Result
1	Jula	"Skrzydlate Ręce"	Advanced
2	Piotr Rubik	"Drive By"	1st Place
3	Afromental	"If I Ain't Got You"	Advanced
4	Ewa Farna	"Billie Jean"	Advanced
5	Andrzej Piaseczny	"Moja i twoja nadzieja"	2nd Place
6	Beata Kozidrak	"Burn It Down"	Eliminated
7	Liber	"Apologize"	3rd Place

==== Week 5 ====
- Group Performance: Blues Brothers – "Everybody Needs Somebody to Love"
- Celebrity Performance: Loka – "Prawdziwe powietrze"'
- Top 6 Teams Performance:

Order	Team	Song	Result
1	Liber	"Poker Face"	2nd Place
2	Andrzej Piaseczny	"Prawy do lewego"	1st Place
3	Ewa Farna	"Freedom! '90	Advanced
4	Piotr Rubik	"Dni, których nie znamy"	Advanced
5	Afromental	"Mamona"	Eliminated
6	Jula	"Sing Hallelujah"	3rd Place

==== Week 6 ====
- Group Performance: Dżem - "Naiwne pytania"
- Group Performance (Women): Cyndi Lauper – "Girls Just Want To Have Fun"
- Group Performance (Men): T.Love - "Chłopaki nie płaczą"
- Top 5 Teams Performance:

Order	Team	Song	Result
1	Jula	"Black or White"	Eliminated in Sing Off
2	Piotr Rubik	lightskyblue"	Advanced in Sing Off
3	Liber	"Co z nami będzie?"	3rd Place
4	Andrzej Piaseczny	"Livin' la Vida Loca"	1st Place
5	Ewa Farna	"Parę chwil"	2nd Place

==== Week 7 ====
- Group Performance: Survivor – "Eye of the Tiger"
- Top 4 Teams Performance:

Order	Team	Song	Song	Result
1	Ewa Farna	"Bez łez"	"Bring Me To Life"	2nd Place
2	Piotr Rubik	"Szklana pogoda"	"Addicted To You"	Eliminated
3	Liber	"Nasze rendez - vous"	"Simply The Best"	3rd Place
4	Andrzej Piaseczny	"Tak Blisko"	"I Still Haven't Found What I'm Looking For"	1st Place

==== Week 8 ====
- Group Performance: Bonnie Tyler – "I Need a Hero"
- Top 3 Teams Performance:

Order	Team	Song	Song	Result	
1	Andrzej Piaseczny	"Śniadanie do łóżka"	"You Are Not Alone"	"Uciekaj serce moje"	1st Place / Immunity
2	Ewa Farna	"Mniej niż zero"	"Survivor"	"40 lat minęło"	3rd Place / Advanced
3	Liber	"Winny"	"Feel"	"Ballada o pancernych"	2nd Place / Advanced

==== Week 9 ====
- Group Performance: Van Halen - "Jump"
- Celebrity Performance: Alicja Węgorzewska, Wojciech Jagielski, Katarzyna Zielińska, Tomasz Pukacki - "Phantom Of The Opera"
- Top 3 Teams Performance:

Team	Music	Result
Liber	Katy Perry - "I Kissed a Girl"	Eliminated
Liber	Jerzy Połomski - "Bo z dziewczynami"	Eliminated
Liber	Andrzej Piaseczny - "Jeszcze bliżej"	Eliminated
Ewa Farna	Edyta Bartosiewicz & Bracia - "Nad przepaścią"	1st Place
Ewa Farna	AC/DC - "You Shook Me All Night Long"	1st Place
Ewa Farna	Liber & Sylwia Grzeszczak - "Mijamy się"	1st Place
Andrzej Piaseczny	Cher - "The Shoop Shoop Song"	Immunitet
Andrzej Piaseczny	Seweryn Krajewski - "Nie jesteś sama"	Immunitet
Andrzej Piaseczny	Ewa Farna - "Cicho"	Immunitet

==== Week 10 ====
- Group Performance: Pink Floyd – "Another Brick In The Wall"
- Top 2 Teams Performance:

Team	Music	Result
Ewa Farna	Selah Sue - "This World"	2nd Place
Ewa Farna	Kukiz & Piersi - "Cału Mnie"	2nd Place
Andrzej Piaseczny	Kayah - "Na językach"	1st Place
Andrzej Piaseczny	Foreigner - "I Want to Know What Love Is"	1st Place

- Top 8 Teams Performance:

Team	Music	Result
Liber	Geri Halliwell - "It's Raining Men"	-
Piotr Rubik	Piotr Rubik - "Psalm do Ciebie"	-
Jula	Mezo & Tabb & Kasia Wilk - "Sacrum"	-
Tomasz Lach & Aleksander Milwiw-Baron	Queen - "The Show Must Go On"	-
Beata Kozidrak	Spice Girls - "Viva Forever"	-
Robert Gawliński	Bee Gees - Stayin' Alive	-

=== Weekly results ===
The order is based on viewer votes.

Order	Week 1	Week 2	Week 3	Week 4	Week 5	Week 6	Week 7	Week 8	Week 9	Week 10 Final
1	Ewa Farna	Jula	Andrzej Piaseczny	Piotr Rubik	Andrzej Piaseczny	Andrzej Piaseczny	Andrzej Piaseczny	Andrzej Piaseczny	Ewa Farna	Andrzej Piaseczny
2	-	-	Liber	Andrzej Piaseczny	Liber	Ewa Farna	Ewa Farna	Liber		Ewa Farna
3	-	-	Piotr Rubik	Liber	Jula	Liber	Liber	Ewa Farna		
4	Piotr Rubik; Andrzej Piaseczny; Tomasz Lach & Aleksander Milwiw-Baron	Robert Gawliński; Beata Kozidrak; Liber	Tomasz Lach & Aleksander Milwiw-Baron; Beata Kozidrak	Tomasz Lach & Aleksander Milwiw-Baron; Jula; Ewa Farna	Piotr Rubik; Ewa Farna	Piotr Rubik				
Eliminated	-	-	Robert Gawliński	Beata Kozidrak	Tomasz Lach & Aleksander Milwiw-Baron	Jula	Piotr Rubik		Liber	

== See also ==
- Clash of the Choirs
