= Józef Razowski =

Polish entomologist and lepidopterist (born 1932)

- Born: 4 April 1932 (age 94); Milówka, Silesian Voivodeship, Poland
- Education: Jagiellonian University
- Awards: Polish State Award; Ignaz Schiffermüller medal
- Scientific career
- Fields: Entomology
- Workplaces: Institute of Systematics and Evolution of Animals of the Polish Academy of Sciences

Józef Razowski (born 4 April 1932) is a Polish entomologist and lepidopterist specializing in Tortricidae. He is an honorary member of the Polish Entomological Society and a working member of the Polish Academy of Arts and Sciences (PAU). From 1988 to 1997, Razowski headed the Institute of Systematics and Evolution of Animals.

== Biography ==
Razowski was born on 4 April 1932, in Milówka, Silesian Voivodeship. After finishing engineering studies at the Tadeusz Kościuszko University of Technology in 1953, he started working at the Faculty of the Systematic Zoology of the Polish Academy of Sciences (PAN) a year later, of which he was director from 1988 to 1997. (Note: The Institute was later renamed the Institute of Systematics and Evolution of Animals)

In the meantime, Razowski pursued further studies at Jagiellonian University, getting his master's degree in 1958 and a PhD in 1961. He then received habilitation in 1966 and was given the title of professor in 1973. In 1975, he founded the Lepidopterology Section of the Polish Entomological Society, which he directed for five years. Razowski retired in 2003.

Razowski specialises in the anatomy, morphology, systematics, and ecology of moths and butterflies of the Palearctic and Neotropical realms, with a focus on tortrix moths, and is credited with the creation of new concepts of the classification of Lepidoptera. Between 1953 and 2006, he described 1744 Lepidopteran taxa and wrote about 20 books and monographs on entomology.

For his contributions in biology, Razowski received some awards, including the Polish State Award of Second Degree and the Ignaz Schiffermüller medal.

== Selected publications ==
- World fauna of the Tortricini: '(Lepidoptera, Tortricidae)', Polish Scientific Publishers, Kraków 1966, 658 p.
- The type specimens of the species of some Tortricidae (Lepidoptera), Polish Scientific Publishers, Kraków 1971
- Lepidoptera of Poland, Volume 1, Washington D.C. 1976
