= Natalia Przybysz =

Polish musician (born 1983)

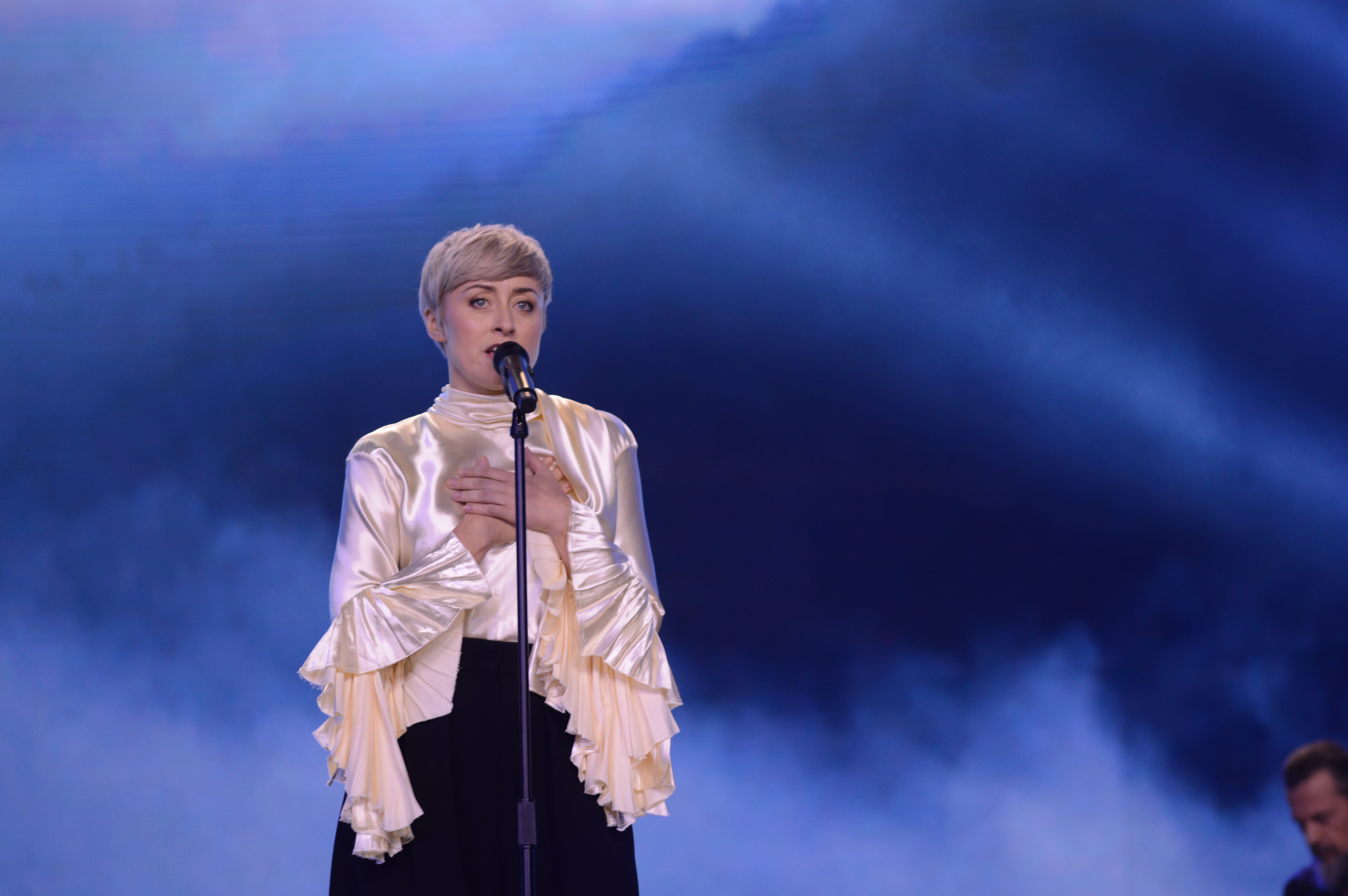
- Natalia Przybysz at the Top of the Top Sopot Festival 2022
- Born: 1 September 1983 (age 42); Warsaw, Poland
- Occupation: Singer
- Musical career
- Also known as: Natu, N'Talia
- Genres: R&B, soul, hip hop, pop
- Instrument: cello
- Years active: 2001–present
- Labels: Galapagos Music, Mystic Production, Warner Music Poland

Natalia Maria Przybysz (born 1 September 1983 in Warsaw), also known as Natu or N'Talia, is a Polish rhythm and blues singer. She is a member of the Polish Society of the Phonographic Industry (Związek Producentów Audio Video, ZPAV).

Natalia Przybysz was one of the founding members of the popular Polish music group Sistars, together with her sister Paulina, from 2001 to 2006, briefly in 2011, and from 2012 to 2013. Since 2008, she has performed solo as Natu and recorded three studio albums. In 2013, after the final disbandment of Sistars, Natalia and Paulina Przybysz started a musical project called Archeo Sisters.

== Career ==
=== Education and Sistars ===
Natalia Przybysz studied cello at a music school in Warsaw. She spent her final year of high school in the United States, in Iowa, and passed her Matura exams there.

In 2001, Natalia, her sister Paulina, and four other musicians started the Polish musical group Sistars, playing a mixture of R&B, soul, hip-hop and pop music. The band has released two number-one studio albums, Siła sióstr (2003) and A.E.I.O.U. (2005), and an extended play titled EP (2004), and became very popular in Poland. The group disbanded in 2006.

=== Solo career ===
In 2008, Natalia Przybysz adopted the pseudonym Natu, and released her debut studio album Maupka Comes Home, a collaboration with music producer Envee. It was followed by the release of her sophomore record Gram duszy in 2010.

In 2012, Natalia and Paulina Przybysz led one of the choirs in the second season of the Polish TV show Bitwa na głosy, broadcast by TVP 2. The same year, Sistars reunited and started working on material for a new record. However, the group broke up again in 2013, and the Przybysz sisters started a new musical project called Archeo Sisters. In June 2013 Natalia Przybysz also released her third album, Kozmic Blues: Tribute to Janis Joplin, containing covers of Janis Joplin songs and one original composition, "Niebieski".

She released her latest album, Prąd, on 17 November 2014 on the Warner Music Poland label.

== Personal life ==
Natalia Przybysz has two children, daughter Aniela (born January 2010) and son Jeremi (born June 2012). She is a vegan.

In October 2016, she admitted she had had an abortion a year before, leading to public criticism in Poland.

== Discography ==
=== Studio albums ===
Title	Album details	Peak chart positions
Title	Album details	POL
Maupka Comes Home (with Envee)	Released: 19 September 2008; Label: Galapagos Music; Formats: CD	18
Gram duszy	Released: 20 September 2010; Label: Mystic Production; Formats: CD, digital download	43
Kozmic Blues: Tribute to Janis Joplin	Released: 3 June 2013; Label: Warner Music Poland; Formats: CD, digital download	37
Prąd	Released: 17 November 2014; Label: Warner Music Poland; Formats: CD, digital download	3
Światło nocne	Released: 1 September 2017; Label: Warner Music Poland; Formats: CD, digital download	3
Jak malować ogień	Released: 25 October 2019; Label: Kayax; Formats: CD, digital download	6
Zaczynam się od miłości	Released: 11 March 2022; Label: Kayax; Formats: CD, digital download	6
Tam	Released: 13 October 2023; Label: Kayax; Formats: CD, digital download	
"—" denotes a recording that did not chart or was not released in that territory.

=== Music videos ===
Title	Year	Directed	Album	Ref.
"Lion Girl"	2008	Marta Pruska, Justyna Jeger Naglowska	Maupka Comes Home	
"Gwiazdy"	2010	Filip Kabulski	Gram duszy	
"Ocean Prayer"	2011	Florian Malak	Gram duszy	
"Niebieski"	2013	Bartosz Pogoda	Kozmic Blues: Tribute to Janis Joplin	
"Maybe"	2013	Kurkot	Kozmic Blues: Tribute to Janis Joplin	
"Miód"	2014	Anna Bajorek	Prąd	
