= Kwadrofonik =

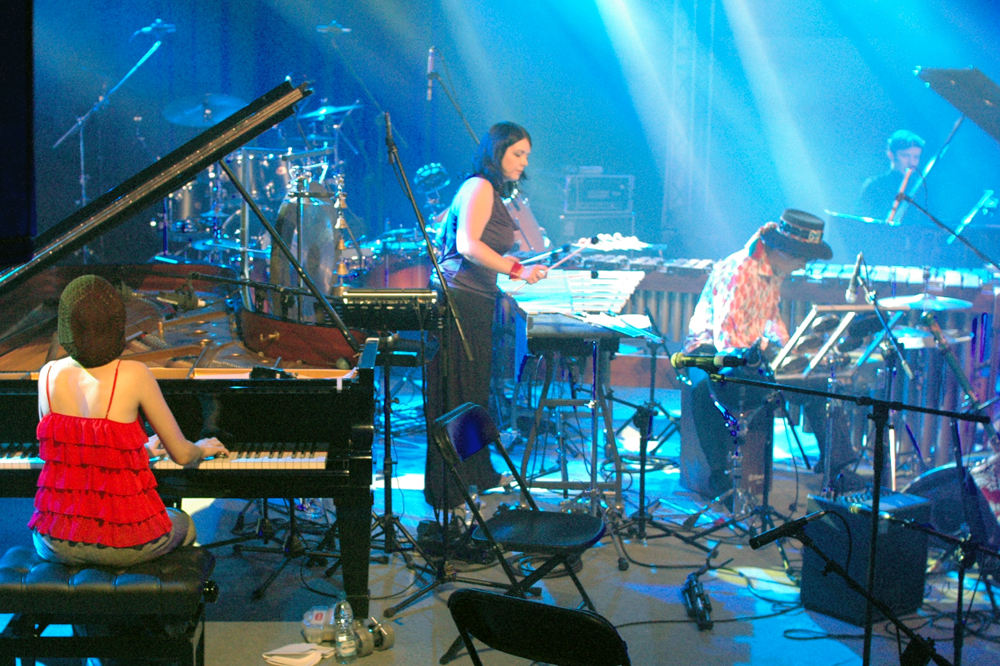

Background information
- Origin: Poland
- Genres: Traditional folk music
- Years active: 2005–present
- Labels: Warner Music Poland, Sony Music Entertainment Poland
- Members: Emilia Sitarz; Bartłomiej Wąsik; Magdalena Kordylasińska; Piotr Maślanka
- Past members: Miłosz Pękala

Kwadrofonik is a Polish band. The unusual combination of percussionists and pianists is the only such quartet in Poland and one of a few in the world.

Founded in 2005, they perform compositions from the twentieth and twenty-first centuries. Their music is inspired by composers like Bartok, George Crumb and Luciano Berio. Through improvisation and musical dialogues they make maximum use of the possibilities offered by two pianos and percussion. The instruments exchange functions almost imperceptibly – the pianos become percussion instruments, while percussion instruments become the melodic ones. For the arrangement of folk songs performed at the ninth Folk Music Festival Nowa Tradycja (New Tradition) in 2006, the musicians were awarded the Grand Prix, an Award from the President of Warsaw and also one from the public – "Burza Braw" (Burst of Applause).

== Discography ==
Title	Album details	Peak chart positions	Sales	Certifications
Title	Album details	POL	Sales	Certifications
Folk Love	Released: April 18, 2008; Label: Warner Music Poland; Formats: CD	—		
Lutosławski Tuwim. Piosenki nie tylko dla dzieci (with Dorota Miśkiewicz)	Released: November 12, 2013; Label: Sony Music Entertainment; Formats: CD, digital download	36	POL: 15,000+	POL: Gold
Requiem ludowe (with Adam Strug)	Released: April 1, 2015; Label: Polskie Radio / NInA	—		
Astronomia poety. Baczyński (with Mela Koteluk)	Released: July 24, 2020; Label: Warsaw Uprising Museum	2		
"—" denotes a recording that did not chart or was not released in that territory.
