= A.E.I.O.U. (album) =

Studio album by Sistars
- Released: September 26, 2005
- Recorded: 2004
- Genres: Pop, R&B, hip hop
- Length: 56:22
- Label: Warner Music Poland
- Producer: Sistars

Sistars chronology
EP (2004)	A.E.I.O.U. (2005)

A.E.I.O.U. is the second studio album by Polish pop/R&B/hip-hop group Sistars, released on September 26, 2005 through Warner Music Poland.

A.E.I.O.U. won the 2005 Fryderyk Award for Hip-Hop/R&B Album of the Year. It was also nominated in the Best Album Design category (Wydawnictwo Specjalne – Najlepsza Oprawa Graficzna).

== Track listing ==
1. "A.E.I.O.U."
2. "Boogie Man"
3. "Dobranocka"
4. "I'm Sorry"
5. "Inspirations"
6. "Intovision"
7. "Keep On Fallin'"
8. "Life Line"
9. "Listen To Your Heart"
10. "My Music"
11. "Na Dwa"
12. "Pure Game"
13. "Skąd Ja Cię Mam"
14. "U R Free"

== Singles ==
Two songs, "My Music" and "Inspirations" were each nominated for the same three 2005 Fryderyk Awards:

- Production of the Year (Light Music category)
- Video of the Year
- Song of the Year

Five songs from the album have appeared on the Poland Singles Chart:

Year	Song	Poland Singles Chart
2005	"My Music"	1
2006	"Na Dwa"	4
2006	"Inspirations"	2
2006	"Skąd Ja Cię Mam"	2
2006	"Listen to Your Heart"	41
