= Szare =

- Village
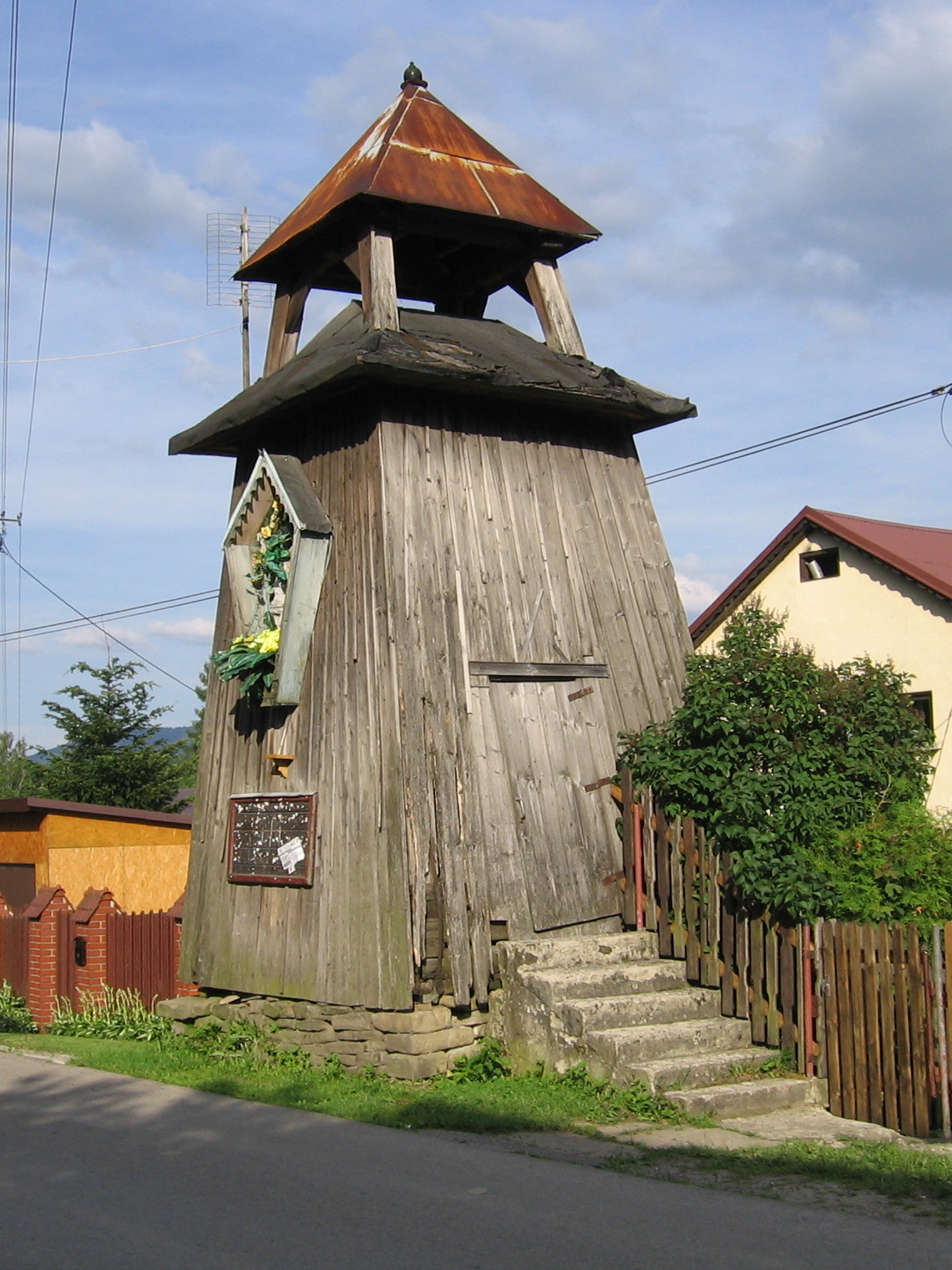
- A wooden belfry in Szare

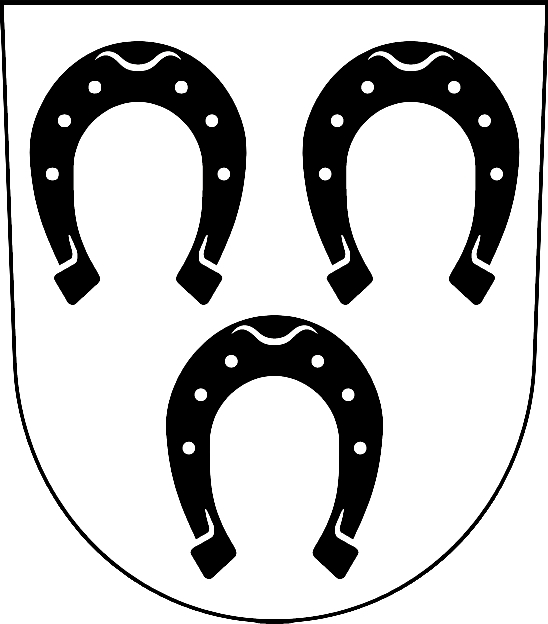
- Coat of arms

- Location within Poland
- Coordinates: 49°33′N 19°2′E
- Country: Poland
- Voivodeship: Silesian
- County: Żywiec
- Gmina: Milówka
- Population: 805

Szare [ˈʂarɛ] is a village in the administrative district of Gmina Milówka, within Żywiec County, Silesian Voivodeship, in southern Poland.

Until 1948 Laliki (then known as Szare Gronie) was part of the village.
