= Gmina Milówka =

Gmina Milówka Milówka Commune
- Gmina
- Coat of arms

- Coordinates (Milówka): 49°33′47″N 19°5′14″E
- Country: Poland
- Voivodeship: Silesian
- County: Żywiec
- Seat: Milówka

Area
  - Total: 98.33 km^{2} (37.97 sq mi)

Population (2019-06-30)
  - Total: 10,052
  - Density: 102.2/km^{2} (264.8/sq mi)
- Website: http://www.milowka.pl

Gmina Milówka is a rural gmina (administrative district) in Żywiec County, Silesian Voivodeship, in southern Poland. Its seat is the village of Milówka, which lies approximately 17 kilometres (11 mi) south-west of Żywiec and 77 km (48 mi) south of the regional capital Katowice.

The gmina covers an area of 98.33 square kilometres (38.0 sq mi), and as of 2019 its total population is 10,052.

== Villages ==
Gmina Milówka contains the villages and settlements of Kamesznica, Laliki, Milówka, Nieledwia and Szare.

== Neighbouring gminas ==
Gmina Milówka is bordered by the town of Wisła and by the gminas of Istebna, Radziechowy-Wieprz, Rajcza, Ujsoły and Węgierska Górka.

== Twin towns – sister cities ==
Gmina Milówka is twinned with:

- Kóny, Hungary
- Markaz, Hungary
- Milíkov, Czech Republic
- Topoľníky, Slovakia
- Valentigney, France
