= Robert Gawliński =

Polish singer and guitarist

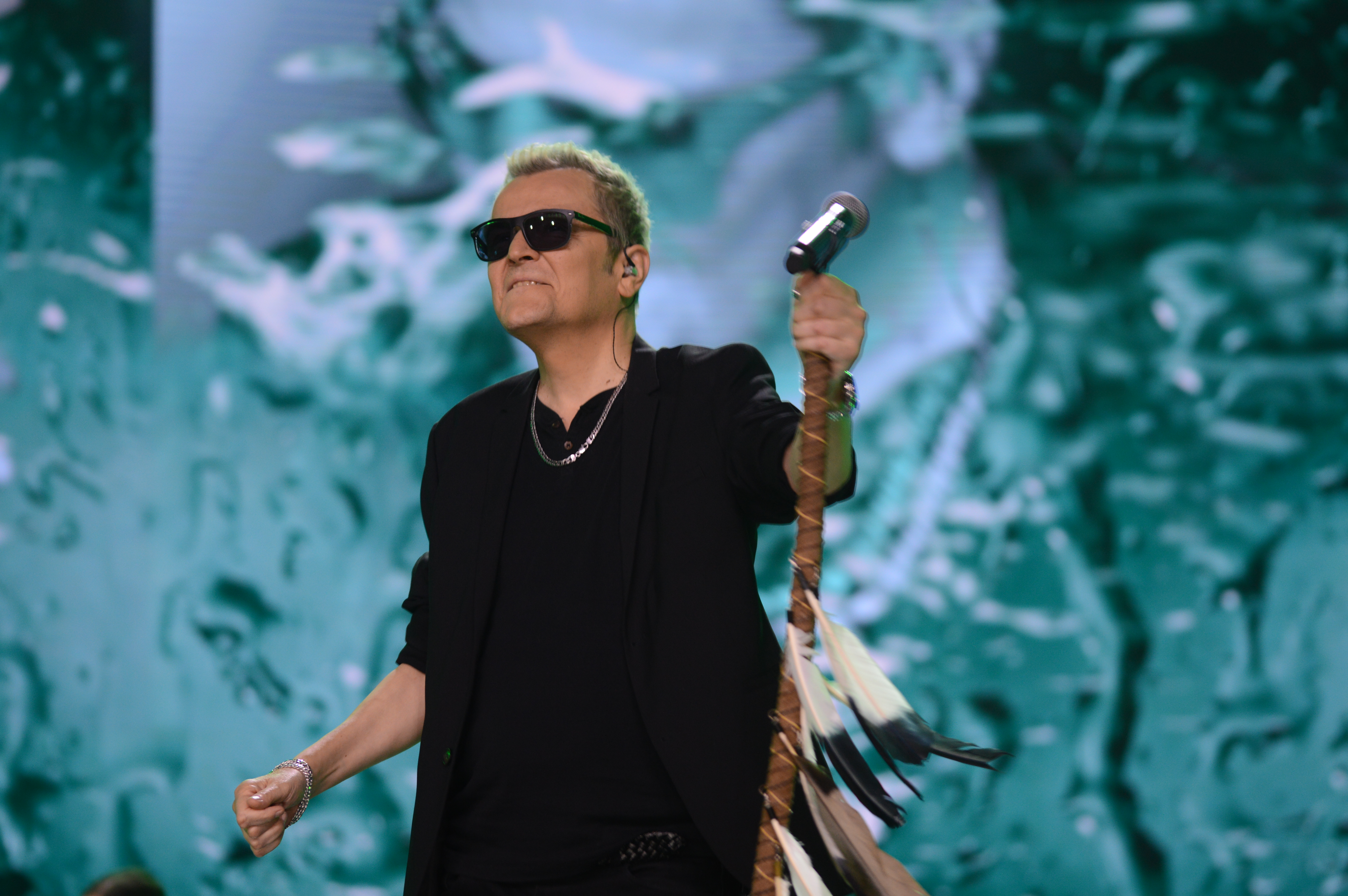
- Robert Gawliński, 2022
- Born: 31 August 1963 (age 62); Warsaw, Poland
- Occupations: Musician, singer
- Spouse: Monika Gawlińska
- Children: 2 (sons)
- Musical career
- Genres: Rock, pop rock
- Instrument: Guitar
- Years active: since 1979
- Labels: MJM Music PL, Starling S.A., Pomaton EMI, EMI Music Poland
- Website: http://robertgawlinski.com/en/bio

Robert Gawliński (born 31 August 1963 in Warsaw) Polish pop rock musician, vocalist and songwriter. His best-known performances are associated with the lead singer and guitarist and the main composer of the band Wilki, as well as his solo career. Throughout his active years, Gawliński received numerous Polish music awards Fryderyk nominations, mostly during the 1990s and 2000s, including repeated nominations as Vocalist of the Year (1994, 1995, 1996, 1998, 1999, 2002, 2004, 2005), Composer of the Year (1995, 1999, 2002, 2004) and Author of the Year (1995, 2002). His solo releases also gained nominations for Album of the Year (Solo, 1995; Gra, 1999), while the song “O sobie samym” was nominated for Song of the Year in 1995. The most successful year was 2002, when he won 6 awards individually and with his band.

== Early life ==
Robert Gawliński was born on 31 August 1963 in Warsaw, Poland. He was raised primarily by his mother after his father left the family when he was seven years old.

He became interested in music at an early age and performed publicly while still in primary school. He was a rebellious teenager, and due to his extravagant appearance, he had two cases filed in juvenile court. Before pursuing a professional music career, he attended secondary school but did not complete the final matriculation examination.

When he was 16, he joined the punk rock band Gniew as vocalist and guitarist, which existed from 1979 to 1982. He then belonged to the Fearless Vampire Hunters. On New Year's Eve 1982, he founded the band Madame, with which he performed at the Jarocin Festival in 1984. With the band, one of the pioneers of cold wave in Poland, he gained some nationwide recognition, promoted by a video clip on TV, and recorded two singles and a live album.

After Madame disbanded in 1986, he played in other well-known bands, such as Made in Poland and Złotousty i Anioły, which he founded with Marek Jackowski from Maanam. The band disbanded after Olga Jackowska decided to reactivate Maanam. In 1986, he joined the band Opera, composed of former Republika musicians, with whom he recorded an album that was not released until the following decade. The band disbanded after Grzegorz Ciechowski reactivated Republika.

In 1992, he founded the band Wilki, with which he gained nationwide top recognition. From 1992 to 1994, he released albums with Wilki annually: Wilki, Przedmieście, and Acousticus Rockus. In 1994, Wilki suspended his activities and then embarked on a solo career.

By the end of the 1990s, he had recorded and released four solo albums: Solo, Kwiaty jak relikwie, X, and Gra. He also played Edward Stachura in the film Wojaczek (1999) and composed the music for and starred in William Shakespeare's Hamlet, staged at the Ochota Theatre. In 2001, he reactivated Wilki, releasing three more albums: 4 (2002), Watra (2004), and Obrazki (2006). In 2009, Wilki went on hiatus again.

In 2010, he released his fifth solo album, Kaleidoscope. He was a choir coach in the TVP2 entertainment program Bitwa na głosy.

== Personal life ==
Gawliński married Monika in 1987, whom he met in 1983 at a Madame gig. Three days before the wedding, he was diagnosed with pituitary cancer. After successful surgery and hospital discharge, he continued his musical career. The couple have twin sons, Emanuel and Beniamin, born in 1992, who also became musicians in their adult life and joined Wilki respectively, Beniamin on guitar in 2014 and Emanuel on bass in 2019. His wife, Monika Gawlińska, has also been working as his manager. In March 2020, partially due to the COVID-19 pandemic, the couple moved to live in Greece, but in 2025 returned to Poland.

== Discography ==
Title	Album details	Peak chart positions	Certifications
Title	Album details	POL	Certifications
Solo	Released: August 31, 1995; Label: MJM Music PL; Formats: CD, digital download	—	POL: Gold
Kwiaty jak relikwie	Released: February 17, 1998; Label: Starling S.A.; Formats: CD	—	
X	Released: April 17, 1998; Label: Starling S.A.; Formats: CD	—	
Gra	Released: October 22, 1999; Label: Pomaton EMI; Formats: CD, digital download	—	
Kalejdoskop	Released: April 20, 2010; Label: EMI Music Poland; Formats: CD, digital download	11	
"—" denotes a recording that did not chart or was not released in that territory.
