= Kamesznica =

- Village
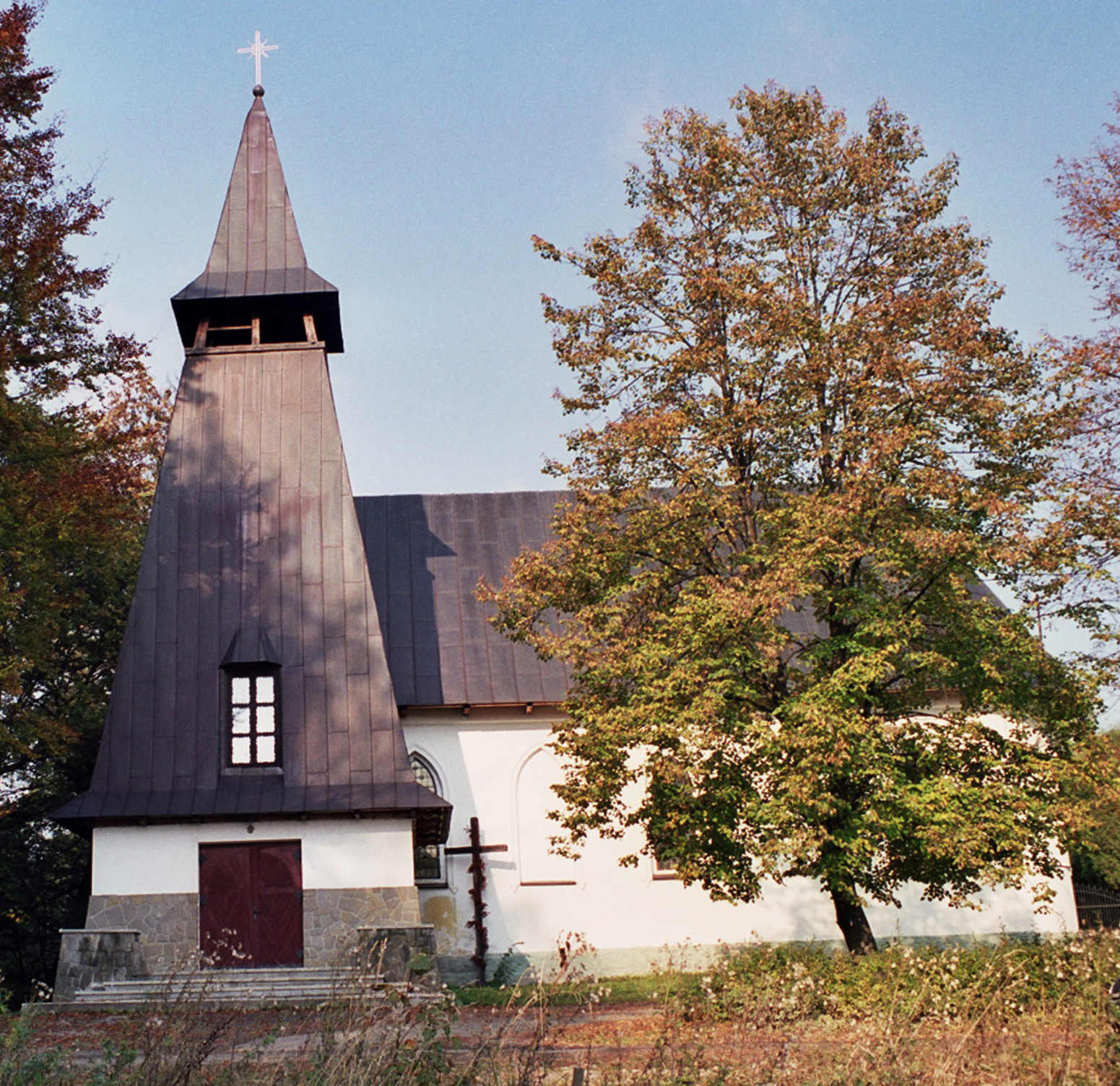
- Our Lady of the Scapular chapel

- Location within Poland
- Coordinates: 49°33′53″N 19°1′14″E
- Country: Poland
- Voivodeship: Silesian
- County: Żywiec
- Gmina: Milówka
- Population: 2,806
- Website: http://www.kamesznica.pl

Kamesznica [kamɛʂˈnit͡sa] is a village in the administrative district of Gmina Milówka, within Żywiec County, Silesian Voivodeship, in southern Poland.
