= Mela Koteluk =

Polish singer

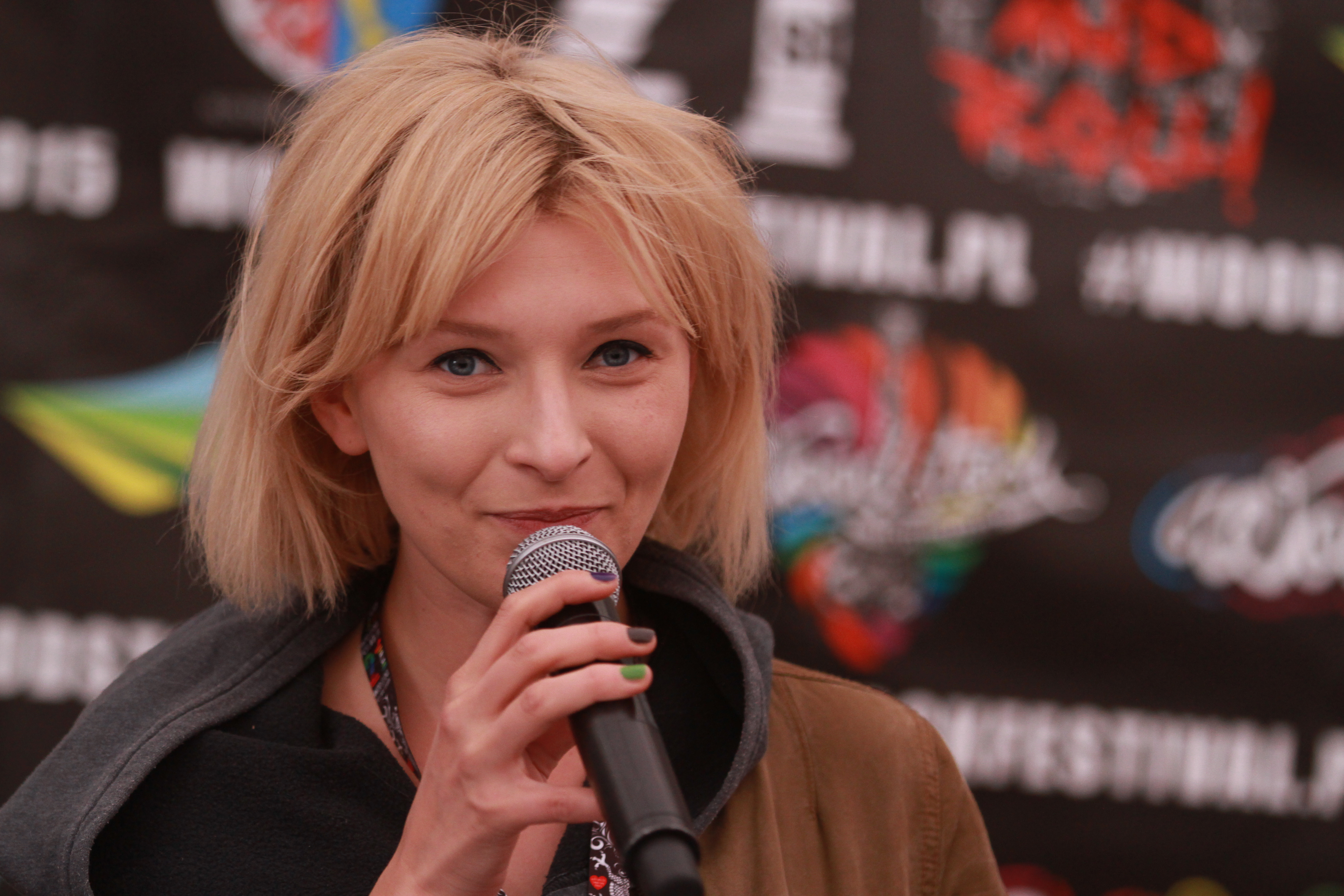
- Mela Koteluk in 2015

Background information
- Born: Malwina Koteluk; 3 July 1985 (age 41); Sulechów, Poland
- Genres: Indie Pop
- Instrument: Vocals
- Labels: EMI Music Poland, Warner Music Poland
- Website: melakoteluk.pl

Malwina Koteluk (born 3 July 1985 in Sulechów), known by her stage name Mela Koteluk, is a Polish singer. At the beginning of her career she worked with artists such as the Scorpions and Gabriela Kulka. In 2003, she came second in a Polish song contest entitled "Pamiętamy o Osieckiej". Koteluk's debut album Spadochron was released in May 2012. In April 2013, she won the Fryderyk award in the New Face of Phonography and Author of the Year categories.

== Discography ==
=== Studio albums ===
Title	Album details	Peak chart positions	Certifications
Title	Album details	POL	Certifications
Spadochron	Released: 8 May 2012; Label: EMI Music Poland; Formats: CD, digital download	1	ZPAV: Platinum
Migracje	Released: 17 November 2014; Label: Warner Music Poland; Formats: CD, digital download	1	
Astronomia poety. Baczyński (with Kwadrofonik)	Released: July 24, 2020; Label: Warsaw Uprising Museum	2	
"—" denotes a recording that did not chart or was not released in that territory.

=== Singles ===
Title	Year	Peak chart positions		Album
Title	Year	SLiP	LP3	Album
"Melodia ulotna"	2012	7	20	Spadochron
"Melodia ulotna (Remixed)"	2012	—	—	non-album single
"Wolna"	2012	19	26	Spadochron
"Wielkie Nieba / To Trop"	2013	—	—	non-album single
"Baczyński – Pieśń o szczęściu" with Czesław Mozil	2013	9	2	non-album single
"Fastrygi"	2014	—	1	Migracje
"—" denotes a recording that did not chart or was not released in that territory.
