= Jarosław Kozidrak =

Polish musician

Jarosław Kozidrak (January 8, 1955 in Lublin – June 12, 2018) was a Polish guitarist and keyboardist, vocalist and composer, and the older brother of Beata Kozidrak.

In 1978, he founded the Bajm band with his sister, Andrzej Pietras and Marek Winiarski, where he played electric guitar, keyboard instruments and sang. As a member of the band, he took part in the recording of the first three albums: "Bajm" (1983),"Martwa Woda" (1985) and "Chroń Mnie" (1986). He was composer of songs such as "Józek, Nie Daruje Ci Tej Nocy" or "Dwa Serca, Dwa Smutki". He left the band in 1987, although he played occasionally at some concerts. In 1999 he released the album "Instrumentalne", containing instrumental versions of Bajm hits.

Kozidrak died on 12 June 2018 at the age of 63.
