= Laliki =

- Village
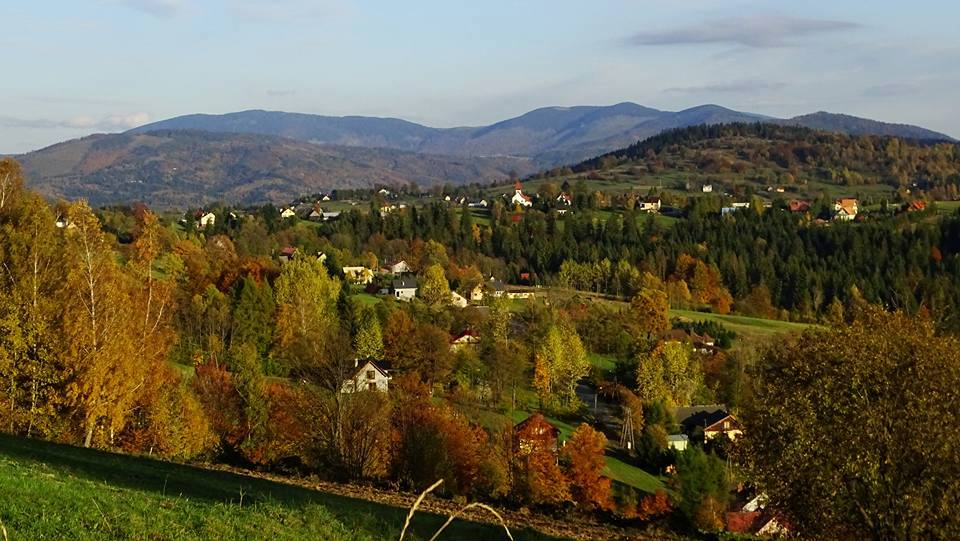
- Panorama of Laliki

- Location within Poland
- Coordinates: 49°32′N 19°0′E
- Country: Poland
- Voivodeship: Silesian
- County: Żywiec
- Gmina: Milówka

Population
  - Total: 1,039
- Website: http://www.laliki.szkola.pl/

Laliki [laˈliki] is a village in the administrative district of Gmina Milówka, within Żywiec County, Silesian Voivodeship, in southern Poland.

Until 1948 it formed a part of the village Szare known as Szare Gronie.
