= Nieledwia =

- Village
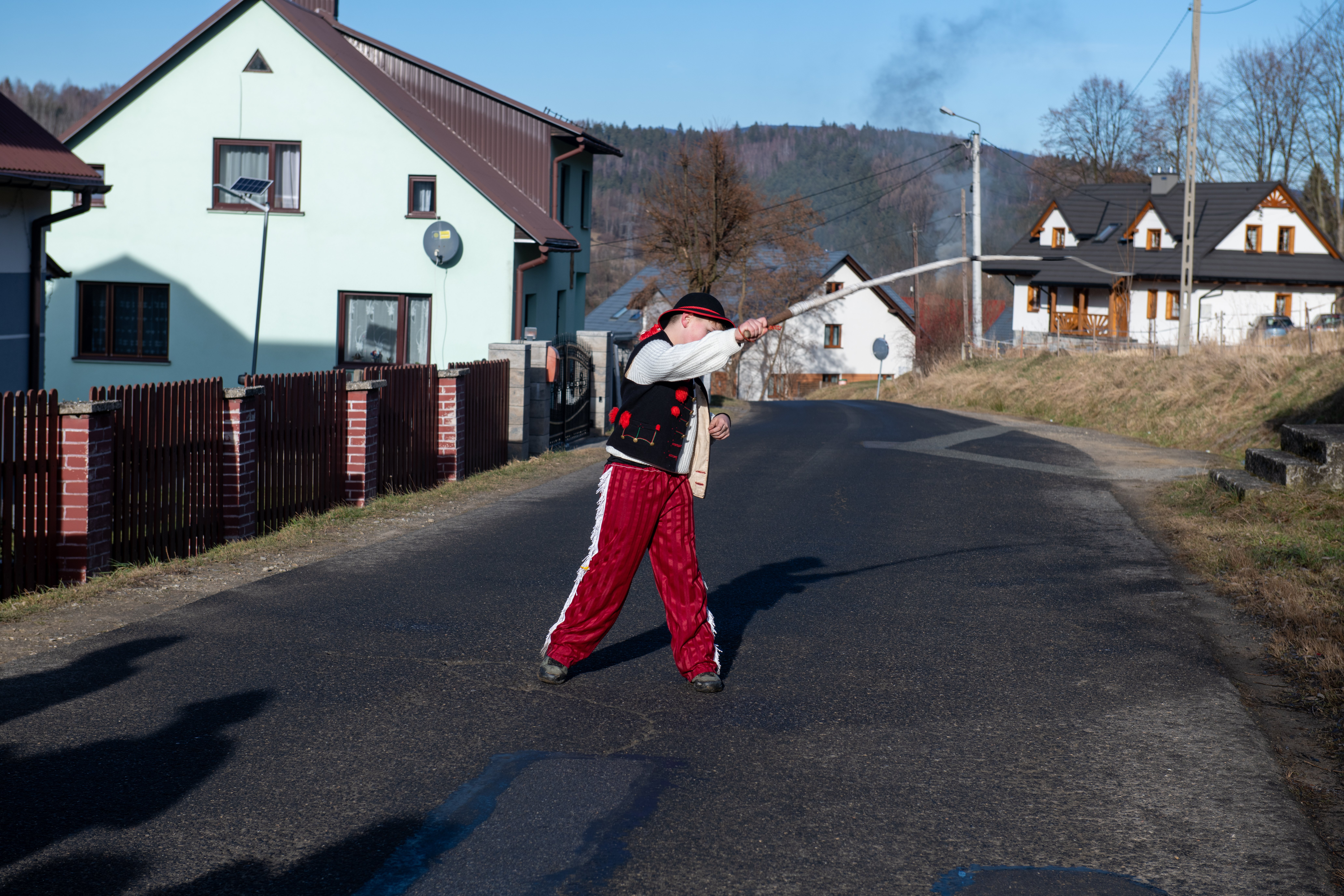

- Location within Poland
- Coordinates: 49°32′40″N 19°4′12″E
- Country: Poland
- Voivodeship: Silesian
- County: Żywiec
- Gmina: Milówka
- Population: 1,046

Nieledwia [ɲɛˈlɛdvja] is a village in the administrative district of Gmina Milówka, within Żywiec County, Silesian Voivodeship, in southern Poland.
