= Sistars =

Polish pop/soul group

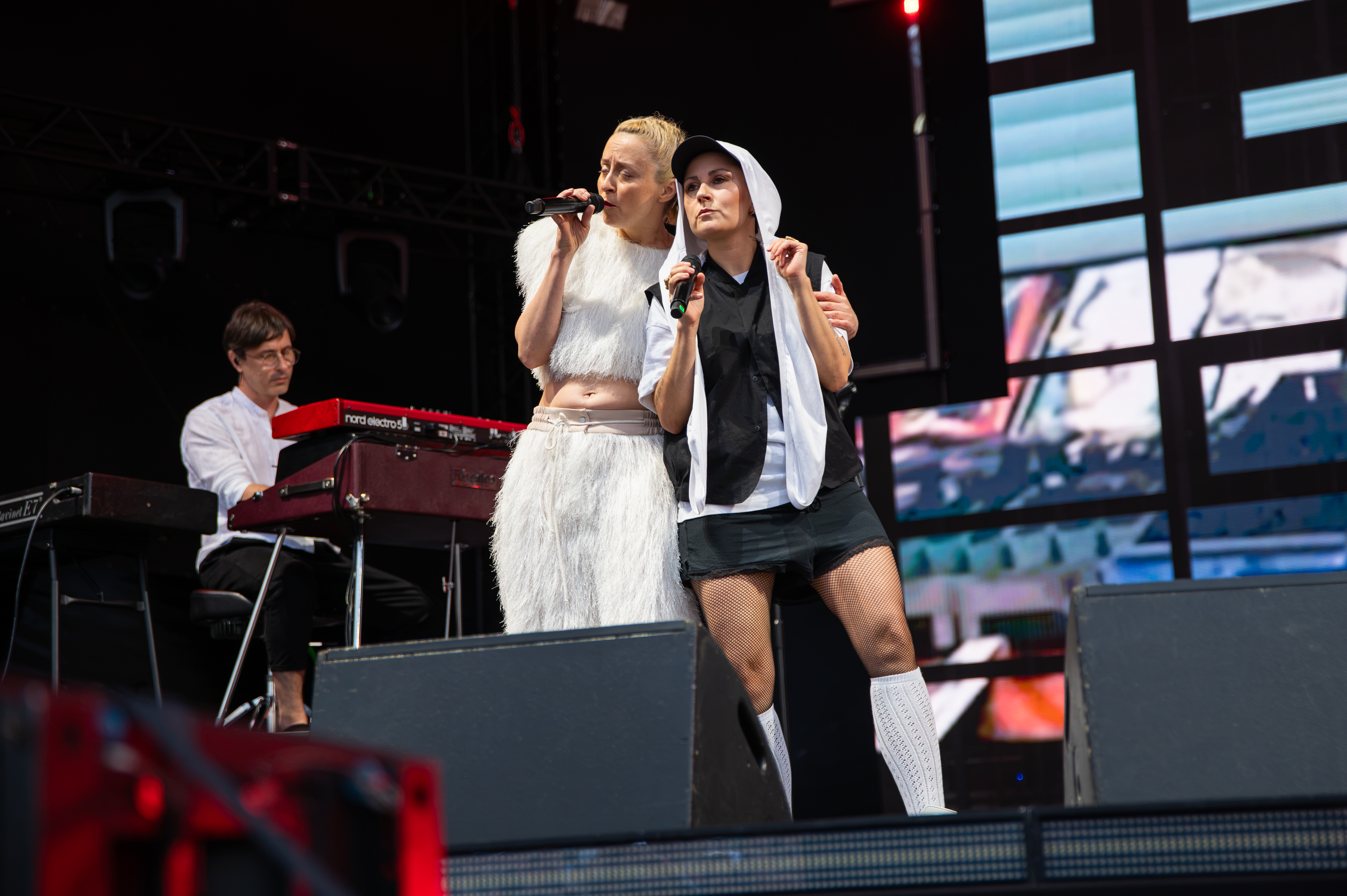
- Natalia and Paulina Przybysz, singers of the band in 2026

Background information
- Years active: 2001–2006, 2011, 2012–2013

Sistars concert at Kocham Katowice Festival, Strefa Kultury, Poland

Sistars is a Polish pop/soul group formed in 2001. Their music showcases the vocals of sister vocalists Natalia Przybysz and Paulina Przybysz, and producers/composers Bartek Królik, Marek Piotrowski incorporating elements of rap, R&B, funk and jazz.

The group first received public attention through a guest performance on the song "Zeszyt rymów" by rapper Tede. March 15, 2003 marked the release of their debut album, Siła sióstr, with guest appearances by O.S.T.R., Tede, Ania Szarmach and others. The album featured by the single "Nie ty, nie my (Spadaj)" which saw the production of a music video. 2004 proved a highly successful year for the group, beginning with the release of the Sistars EP, whose single "Sutra" was an instant hit. Later that year the group received multiple Polish music awards, including an ESKA award for Best Debut, as well as the Audience Award and Grand Prix at the Opole 2004 Music Festival. In 2005 Sistars released their second album, A.E.I.O.U., which solidified their standing in the Polish hip-hop scene, in addition to winning three Fryderyk Awards and an ESKA award for Best Band. Sistars also won the MTV Europe Music Award for "Best Polish Act" for two consecutive years, beginning in 2004. The group split in 2006, with the vocalists beginning solo careers.

In 2011, the group reunited for one concert during the Orange Warsaw Festival. A year later, they decided to end the hiatus and start working on new material. The first song after a 7-year break, titled "Ziemia", was released to Polish radio stations in 2013. The band broke up again a few months later, due to conflicts and difficulties in collaboration.

Paulina and Natalia are vegans.

== Band members ==
- Natalia Przybysz (N'Talia) – vocals
- Paulina Przybysz (Lil' Sista) – vocals
- Bartek Królik (BQ) – vocals / bass
- Marek Piotrowski (Maru$) – keyboards
- Przemysław Maciołek (Przemo) – guitars
- Robert Luty – drums
- Marcin Ułanowski (U1) – drums (ex-member)

== Discography ==
=== Albums ===
Title	Album details	Peak chart positions	Certifications
Title	Album details	POL	Certifications
Siła sióstr	Released: September 15, 2003; Label: Warner Music Poland/Wielkie Joł	1	
A.E.I.O.U.	Released: September 26, 2005; Label: Warner Music Poland	1	ZPAV: Gold

=== Extended plays ===
Title	Album details
EP	Released: June 21, 2004; Label: Warner Music Poland

=== Compilation albums ===
Title	Album details
The Best of Sistars	Released: July 2, 2007; Label: Warner Music Poland

=== Singles ===
Song	Year	Album
"Spadaj"	2003	Siła Sióstr
"Synu"	2003	Siła Sióstr
"Freedom"	2004	EP
"Sutra"	2004	EP
"My Music"	2005	A.E.I.O.U.
"Na Dwa"	2006	A.E.I.O.U.
"Inspirations"	2006	A.E.I.O.U.
"Skąd Ja Cię Mam"	2006	A.E.I.O.U.
"Listen To Your Heart"	2006	A.E.I.O.U.
"Ziemia"	2013	Non-album single
