= MJM Music PL =

- Founded: 1990
- Founder: Andrzej Wojciechowski
- Genre: various
- Country of origin: Warsaw, Poland
- Location: Poland
- Official website: www.mjmmusic.pl

MJM Music PL, is a Polish independent record label founded in 1990 in Warsaw by Polskie Radio journalist Andrzej Wojciechowski.

In the early days, founders wife Małgorzata Maliszewska obtained licenses for albums by such artists as Pet Shop Boys, Tina Turner, Joe Cocker, The Rolling Stones and The Eurythmics among others, to be released in Poland. Soon later MJM Music PL represented in Poland major labels EMI, Warner Music Group, BMG, CBS and PolyGram. MJM Music PL at the time signed several home country artists such as Wilki, O.N.A., Myslovitz, Lech Janerka, and Renata Przemyk among others.

In 1995 label was purchased by Sony Music Entertainment Poland. In 2003 Andrzej Wojciechowski with Piotr Mikołajczyk, former employee for EMI Music Poland bought MJM Music PL from Sony and started operating as an independent label.

== Artists ==
=== Current ===
- Carrion
- Dolzz
- Dwaa
- Great Line
- Half Light
- Izabela Kopeć
- Jakub Żak
- Janusz Rybiński
- Krzysztof Respondek
- Lustro
- Małgorzata Walewska
- Milczenie Owiec
- Mistic
- Newtones
- Piotr Woźniak
- Power of Trinity
- Sond
- Tomasz Korpanty
- Werk

=== Former ===
- Bakshish
- Cave
- Chłopcy z placu broni
- Cytadela
- Daab
- Farba
- Frank Rubel
- Hedone
- Human
- Katy Carr
- Lech Janerka
- Mancu
- Martyna Jakubowicz
- Myslovitz
- No Limits
- O.N.A.
- One Million Bulgarians
- Opera
- Plateau
- Renata Przemyk
- Robert Gawliński
- Skawalker
- Strajk
- Subway
- Tubylcy Betonu
- Wilki
- Ziyo
