= Dorota Miśkiewicz =

Polish singer-songwriter (born 1973)

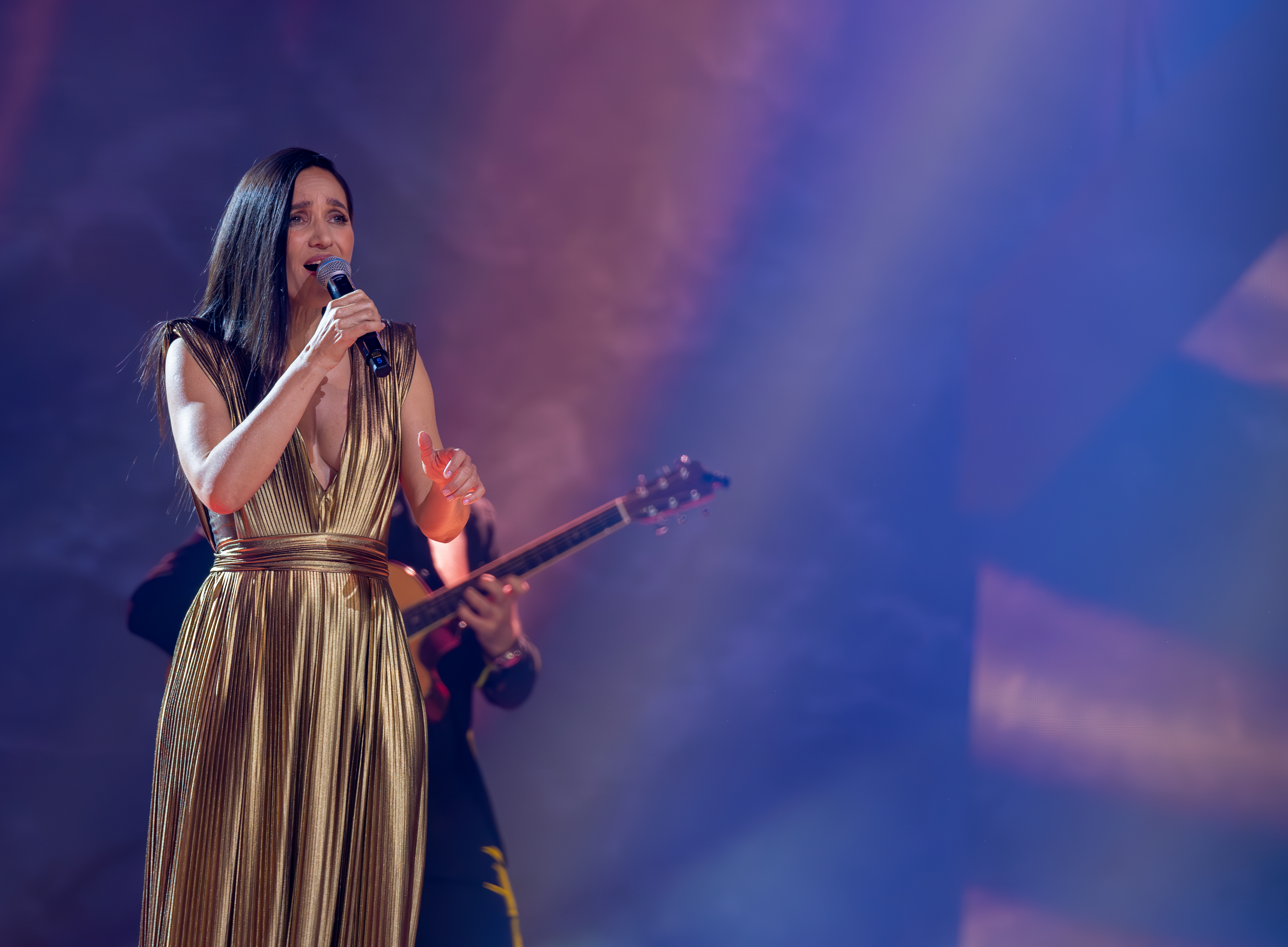
- Dorota Miśkiewicz, 2024
- Born: September 12, 1973 (age 52); Kłodzko, Poland
- Education: Fryderyk Chopin Music Academy
- Occupations: Singer, musician
- Parent(s): Henryk Miśkiewicz; Grażyna Miśkiewicz
- Relatives: Michał Miśkiewicz (brother)
- Musical career
- Genres: Jazz
- Instrument: Violin
- Labels: Sony BMG Music Entertainment Poland, Sony Music Entertainment Poland
- Website: www.dorotamiskiewicz.com

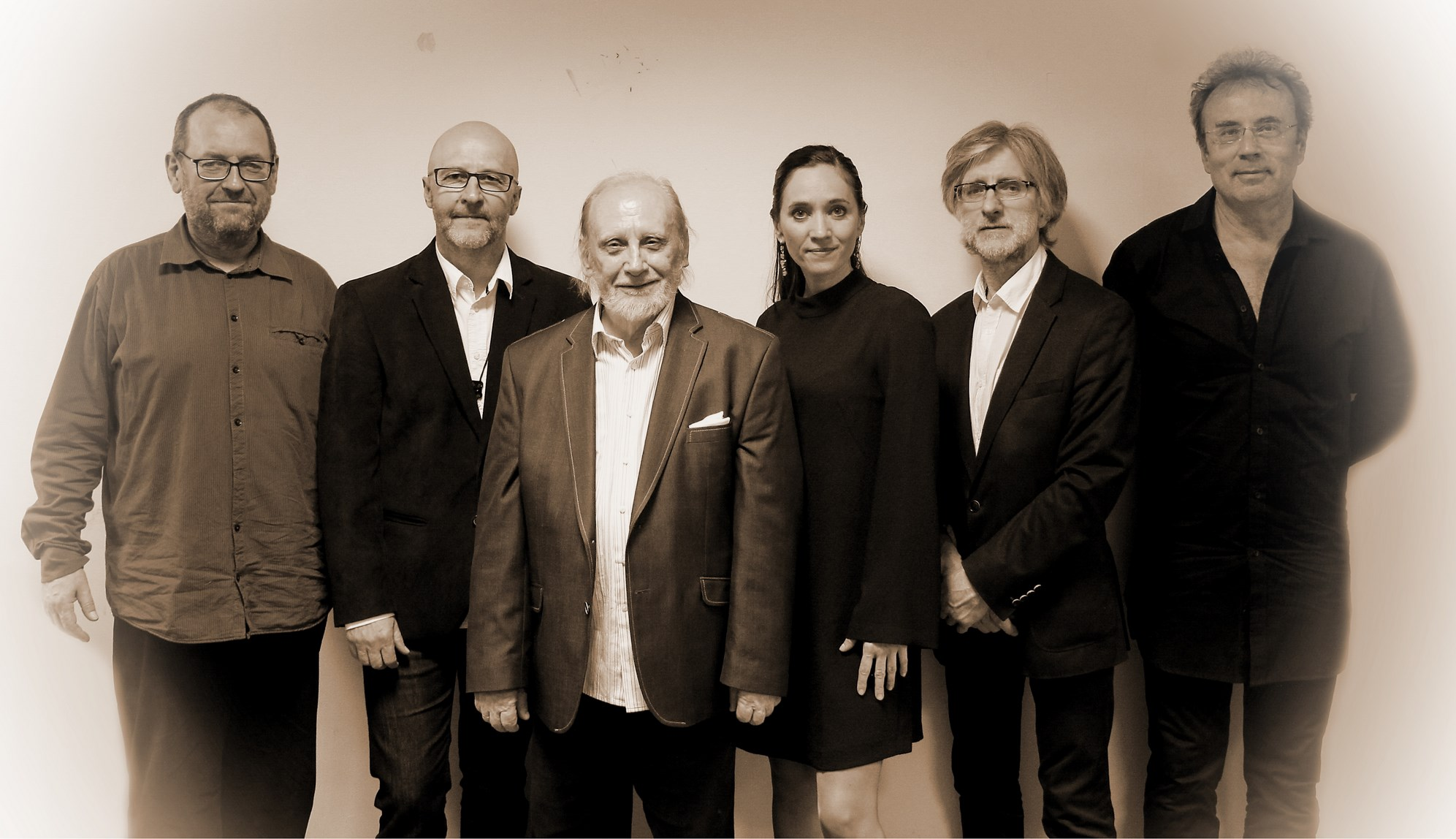
Włodzimierz Nahorny Sextet (2017) (Mariusz Bogdanowicz, Wojciech Staroniewicz, Włodzimierz Nahorny, Dorota Miśkiewicz, Henryk Gembalski, Piotr Biskupski)

Dorota Miśkiewicz [dɔˈrɔta miɕˈkʲɛvit͡ʂ] (born 12 September 1973) is a Polish singer, songwriter, composer, and violinist.

With a background in jazz, her work extends into other musical genres, including Latin rhythms. She has released a number of solo and collaborative albums and singles, and her 2008 album Caminho won a gold disc. She has twice received nominations for the Fryderyk Polish music awards.

== Early life ==
Dorota Miśkiewicz was born on 12 September 1973 in Kłodzko, southern Poland. Her father Henryk (born 1951) is a well-known jazz saxophonist and composer. Her younger brother Michał (born 1977) would become a jazz percussionist, winning Fryderyk awards with the Simple Acoustic Trio (renamed the Marcin Wasilewski Trio in 2008).

Dorota studied the violin at the Fryderyk Chopin Music Academy in Warsaw, graduating in 1997. In 1994 she joined the sextet of jazz musician Włodzimierz Nahorny, recording four albums with the group as vocalist and violinist.

== Career ==
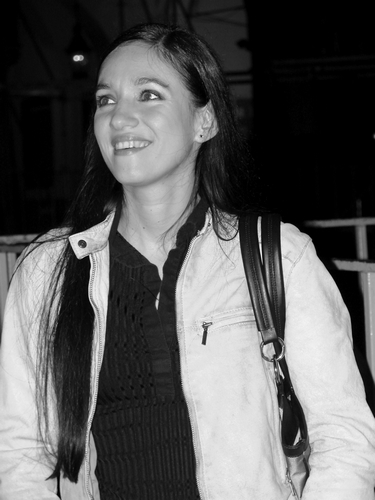

Miśkiewicz has given many performances in Poland and internationally as a solo artist and alongside others, including with Nigel Kennedy in Vienna and Belgrade. She has also made recordings with other artists, including a duet on Cesária Évora's album Rogamar.

Her first solo album, featuring songs which she herself composed, was released in 2002 and titled Dorota Miśkiewicz Goes To Heaven - Zatrzymaj się ("Stop"). It was nominated for the Fryderyk prize for Jazz Album of the Year.

Her next album was released in October 2004, entitled Pod rzęsami ("Under the eyelashes"). It featured the track "W małych istnieniach" ("In small existences") which had qualified for the premieres competition at the Opole Festival. The album's title track, recorded with Grzegorz Turnau, had featured on the soundtrack of the film Zakochany Anioł ("Beloved Angel"). The album also featured the single Poza czasem ("Beyond time").

Her third album was released in September 2008, and is titled Caminho (meaning "Way" or "Path" in Portuguese). Other artists appearing on the album include Brazilian percussionist Guello, jazz pianist Marcin Wasilewski, guitarist Marek Napiórkowski, who also co-wrote some tracks, and Grzegorz Turnau, who wrote the lyrics to the title track and one other song. The song "Magda, proszę" ("Magda, please") was performed at the Opole Festival and was given second place by the jury. The album won a gold disc and a Fryderyk nomination.

According to the Rzeczpospolita newspaper, although her background is in jazz, she has successfully turned her hand to other genres, including pop, bossa nova and samba.

Her fourth album Ale ("But") was released in May 2012.

== Discography ==
Title	Album details	Peak chart positions	Sales	Certifications
Title	Album details	POL	Sales	Certifications
Zatrzymaj się	Released: November 17, 2002; Label: Grami; Formats: CD	—		
Pod rzęsami	Released: October 24, 2005; Label: Sony BMG; Formats: CD, digital download	15		
Caminho	Released: September 19, 2008; Label: Sony BMG; Formats: CD, digital download	13		
Ale	Released: May 8, 2012; Label: Sony Music Entertainment; Formats: CD, digital download	20		
Lutosławski Tuwim. Piosenki nie tylko dla dzieci (with Kwadrofonik)	Released: November 12, 2013; Label: Sony Music Entertainment; Formats: CD, digital download	36	POL: 15,000+	POL: Gold
"—" denotes a recording that did not chart or was not released in that territory.
