= Golec uOrkiestra =

Polish folk-rock group

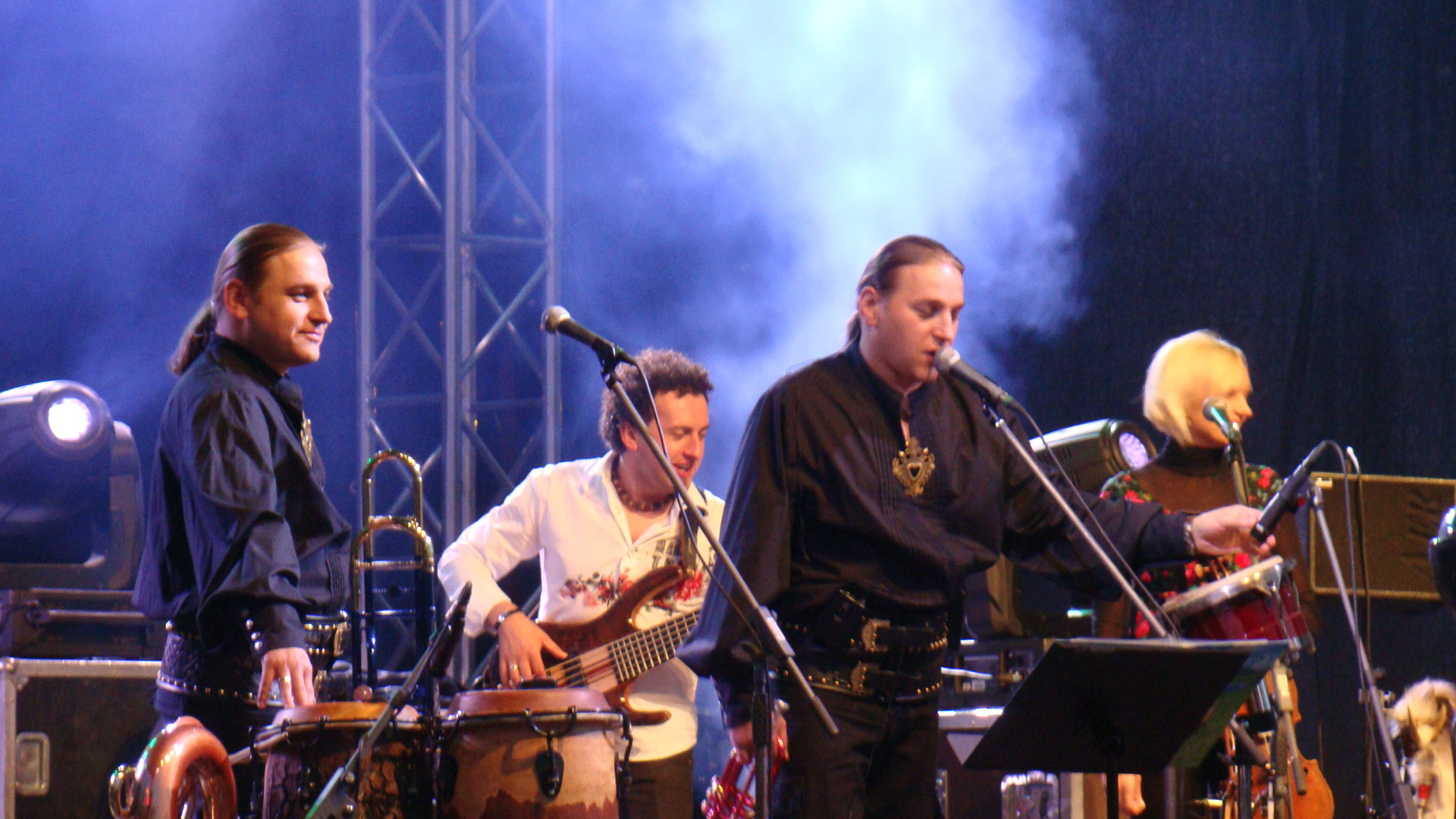
- From left to right: Łukasz Golec, Robert Szewczuga, Paweł Golec, Edyta Golec.

Background information
- Origin: Milówka, Poland
- Genres: folk, Pop
- Years active: 1998–present
- Label: Golec Fabryka
- Website: golec.pl

Golec uOrkiestra is a Polish folk-rock group, founded in 1998 in the southern village of Milówka near Żywiec by twin brothers Paweł and Łukasz Golec, after whom it is named. At its inception, the group consisted of eight musicians. The band performed mostly during holidays but also in local clubs. In 1999, two more musicians were added, and in March of that year, the first album was recorded in a studio in Bielsko-Biała. In the following years, Golec uOrkiestra recorded several more albums, becoming one of the most popular folk-rock bands in the country. In an address given on June 15, 2001, at Warsaw University, president George W. Bush referenced one of the group's songs, "Ściernisko" saying "Today's own Poland's orchestra called Golec's, is telling the world, "On that wheatfield, I'm gonna build my San Francisco; over that molehill, I'm gonna build my bank."

== Personnel ==
Łukasz Golec, Paweł Golec, Edyta Golec, Jarosław Zawada, Zbyszek Michałek – Baja, Piotr Kalicki, Robert Szewczuga, Łukasz Plich, Mirosław Hady

== Discography ==
=== Studio albums ===
| Title | Album details | Peak chart positions | Sales | Certifications |
| Title | Album details | POL | Sales | Certifications |
|---|---|---|---|---|
| Golec uOrkiestra 1 | Released: 1999; Label: Accord; Formats: CD, digital download | 3 | POL: 200,000+ | POL: 2× Platinum |
| Golec uOrkiestra 2 | Released: October 31, 2000; Label: Golec Fabryka; Formats: CD, digital download | 1 | POL: 400,000+ | POL: 4× Platinum |
| Golec uOrkiestra 3 | Released: March 13, 2002; Label: Golec Fabryka; Formats: CD, digital download | 1 | POL: 100,000+ | POL: Platinum |
| Golec uOrkiestra 4 | Released: June 28, 2004; Label: Golec Fabryka; Formats: CD, digital download | 6 | POL: 70,000+ | POL: Platinum |
| Golec uOrkiestra 5 | Released: May 29, 2009; Label: Golec Fabryka; Formats: CD, digital download | 19 | POL: 15,000+ | POL: Gold |
"—" denotes a recording that did not chart or was not released in that territory.

=== Compilation albums ===
| Title | Album details | Peak chart positions | Sales | Certifications |
| Title | Album details | POL | Sales | Certifications |
|---|---|---|---|---|
| The Best of Golec uOrkiestra | Released: October 13, 2013; Label: Golec Fabryka; Formats: CD, digital download | 33 | POL: 15,000+ | POL: Gold |
"—" denotes a recording that did not chart or was not released in that territory.

=== Christmas albums ===
| Title | Album details | Peak chart positions |
| Title | Album details | POL |
|---|---|---|
| Święta z Golec uOrkiestrą | Released: November 21, 2000; Label: Golec Fabryka; Formats: CD | 21 |
| W niebo głosy | Released: 2003; Label: Golec Fabryka; Formats: CD | — |
| Nieziemskie granie dla Ciebie Panie | Released: December 5, 2005; Label: Golec Fabryka; Formats: CD, digital download | 17 |
"—" denotes a recording that did not chart or was not released in that territory.

=== Live albums ===
| Title | Album details | Peak chart positions |
| Title | Album details | POL |
|---|---|---|
| Koncert kolęd i pastorałek w bazylice jasnogórskiej | Released: November 24, 2014; Label: Golec Fabryka; Formats: CD+DVD, digital download | 8 |
"—" denotes a recording that did not chart or was not released in that territory.

=== Soundtracks ===
| Title | Album details | Peak chart positions |
| Title | Album details | POL |
|---|---|---|
| Pieniądze to nie wszystko | Released: 2001; Label: Golec Fabryka; Formats: CD | 45 |
"—" denotes a recording that did not chart or was not released in that territory.

== Prize and awards ==
- 24 October 2020: the 9th edition of the John Paul II Prize in Bisceglie, Italy, together with the Roman Catholic Apostolic Nuncio Francisco-Javier Lozano Sebastián, Simona amabene, the Italian founder of the Marian family prayer Costola Rosa, the singers Paolo Mengoli, Manuela Villa, Igor Minerva, Daniele Si Nasce, Devis Manoni, Silva Perentin, and the actors Daniela Poggi, Valentina Persia, Luca Capuano and Vincenzo Bocciarelli.
