= Anna Szarmach =

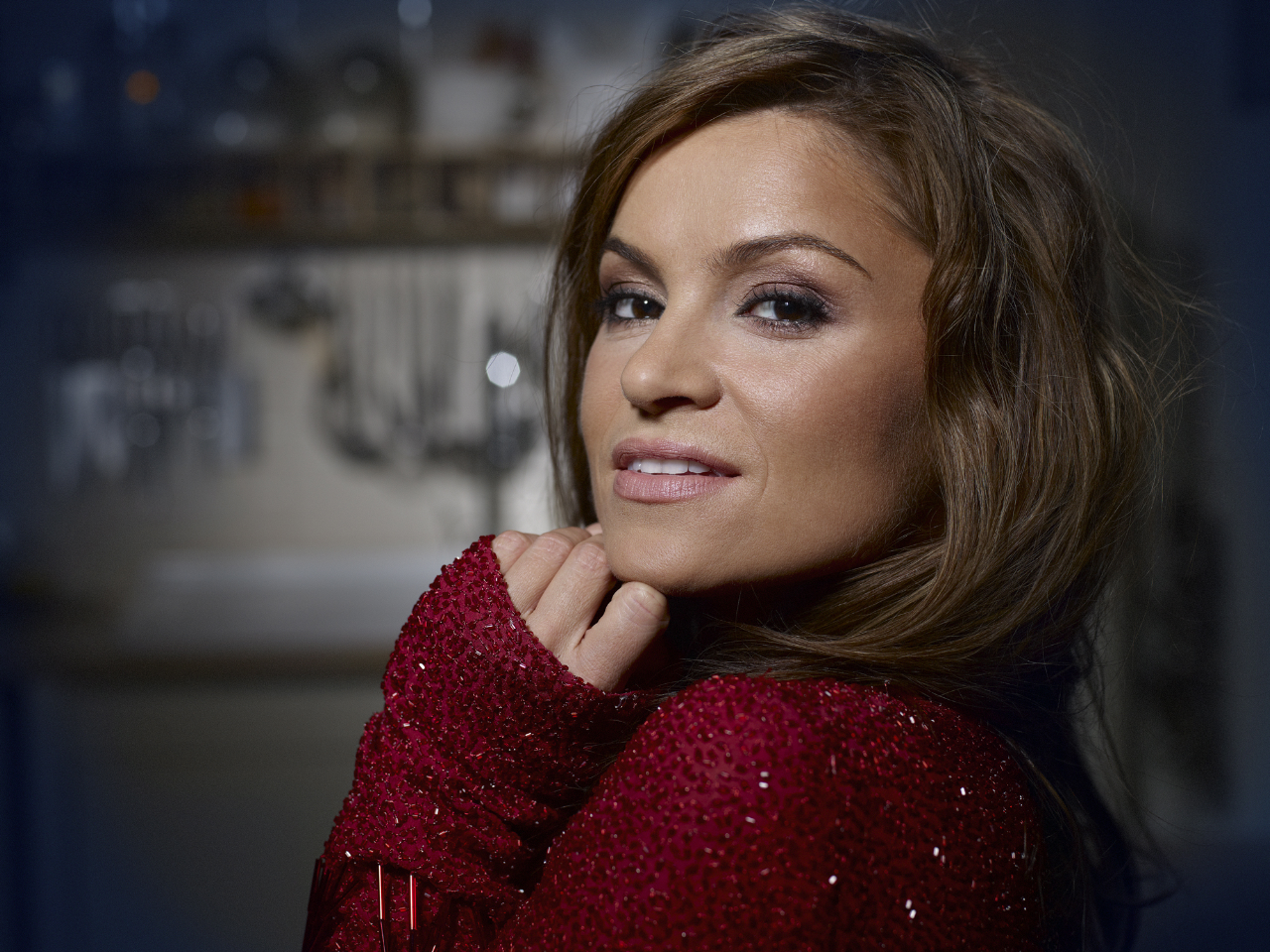

Background information
- Born: Anna Szarmach; February 12, 1978 (age 48); Starogard Gdański, Poland
- Genres: Pop, Jazz
- Occupations: Singer, songwriter
- Instruments: Vocals, piano
- Labels: Warner Music Poland, Agora SA
- Website: aniaszarmach.pl

Ania Szarmach (born 12 February 1978, Starogard Gdański, Poland) – also known as Sharmi – is a Polish jazz and pop singer, composer and songwriter. She is a graduate of University of Music in Katowice. In 2011 she was nominated to Fryderyk music award.

== Discography ==
=== Studio albums ===
Title	Album details	Peak chart positions
Title	Album details	POL
Sharmi	Released: October 23, 2006; Label: Warner Music Poland; Formats: CD	50
Inna	Released: February 5, 2010; Label: Agora SA; Formats: CD, digital download	—
POZYTYWka	Released: December 4, 2012; Label: Agora SA; Formats: CD, digital download	—
"—" denotes a recording that did not chart or was not released in that territory.

=== Music videos ===
Title	Year	Directed	Album	Ref.
"Silna"	2006	—	Sharmi	
"Wybieram Cię"	2008	—	—	
"Dlaczego"	2010	Jacek Kościuszko	Inna	
"Z tobą"	2012	Celina Skiba, Jacek Kościuszko	POZYTYWka	
