= Warner Music Poland =

Polish record label of Warner Music Group

- Parent company: Warner Music Group
- Founded: 1994
- Genre: various
- Country of origin: Poland
- Location: ul. Osmańska 11, 02-823 Warsaw
- Official website: www.warnermusic.pl

Warner Music Poland Sp. z o.o., is a Polish subsidiary of Warner Music Group, it was founded in 1994 in Warsaw. The label's CEO is Piotr Kabaj.

The label started with a catalog of Polish national record label Polton which was bought from Starstream Communications Group by Warner Music Group.

In 2014 Warner Music Poland was merged with Parlophone Music Poland Sp. z o.o., after Parlophone Records, Ltd. was sold by Universal Music Group to Warner Music Group

Warner Music Poland catalogue includes also EMI Music Poland releases before it was renamed in 2013 to Parlophone. That include rights for titles by such artists as Blue Café, T.Love, Voo Voo, Wojciech Waglewski, Wilki and Pati Yang among others.

WMP distributes in Poland releases by such labels as Warner Classics, Nuclear Blast and Roadrunner Records among others.

WMP acquired Polskie Nagrania Muza, Poland's oldest record label, in May 2015.

== Artists ==
=== Current ===
- Ruth Koleva
- Afromental
- Nevena Paykova
- Agnieszka Chylińska
- Blanka Stajkow
- Stan Noir
- Elektryczne Gitary
- Fair Weather Friends
- Gang
- Maciej Maleńczuk
- Kasia Stankiewicz
- Katarzyna Groniec
- Les Ki
- LemON
- L.U.C
- Łzy
- Maja Koman
- Mela Koteluk
- Megitza
- Mikromusic
- Natalia Przybysz
- OCN
- Przemysław Budny
- Stan Borys
- T.Love
- Tatiana Okupnik
- The Dumplings
- Uniqplan
- Xxanaxx
- Warszawskie Combo Taneczne
- Zygmunt Staszczyk

=== Former ===
- Anna Maria Jopek & Pat Metheny
- Anna Szarmach
- Blenders
- Dezerter
- Hey
- Koli
- Kilersi
- Małgorzata Ostrowska
- Mistic
- Medusa
- Negatyw
- Onar & O$ka
- Oxy.Gen
- Papa Dance
- Püdelsi
- Sistars (disbanded)
- TSA
- WSZ & CNE

== See also ==
- BMG Poland
- PolyGram Poland
- Sony Music Entertainment Poland
- Sony BMG Music Entertainment Poland
- Universal Music Poland
