= Beata Kozidrak =

Polish singer and songwriter (born 1960)

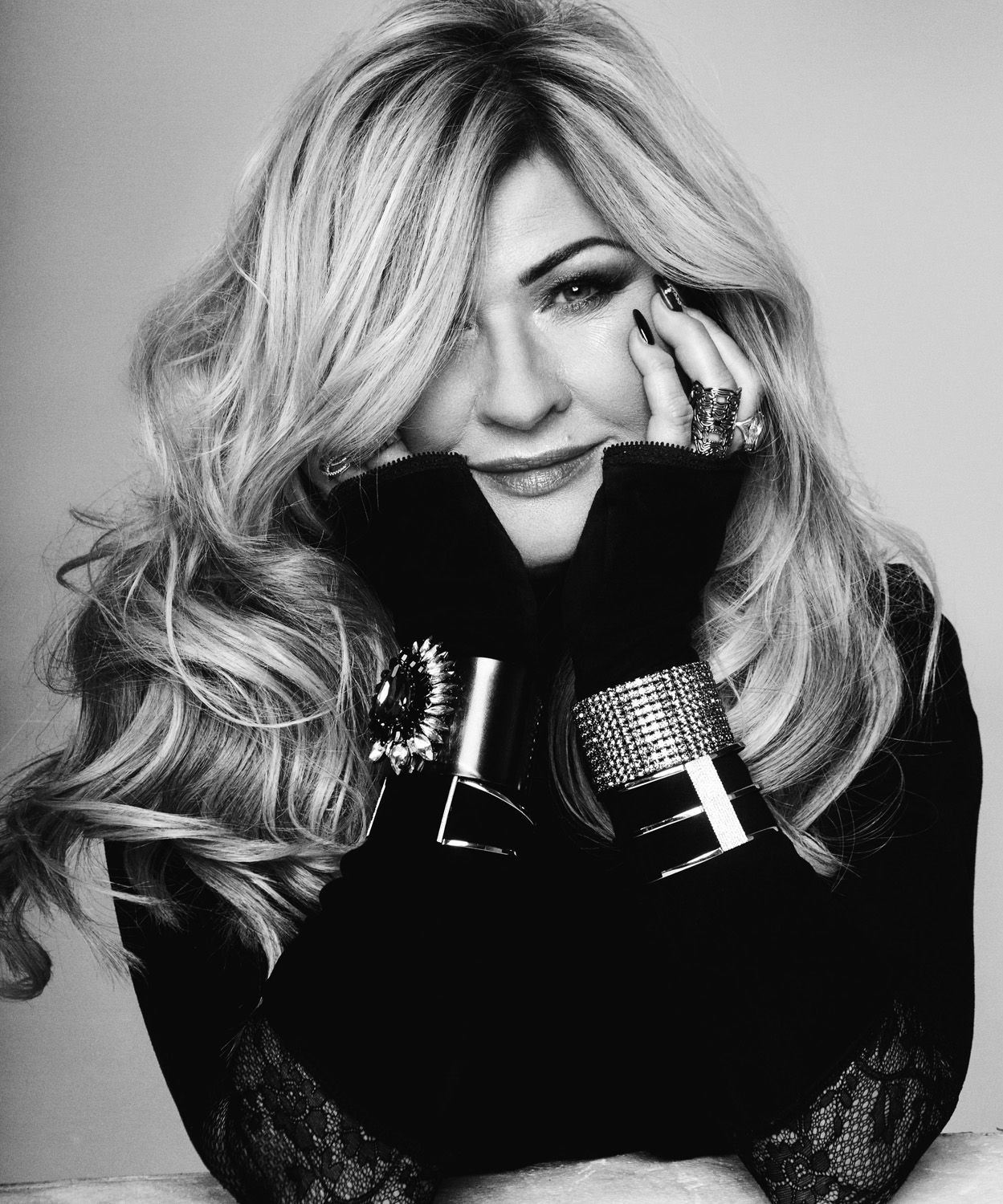
- Born: Beata Elżbieta Kozidrak; 4 May 1960 (age 66); Lublin, Poland
- Occupations: Singer; songwriter
- Spouse: Andrzej Pietras (m. 1979; div. 2016)
- Children: Katarzyna; Agata
- Relatives: Mariola (sister); Jarosław Kozidrak (brother)
- Musical career
- Genres: Pop-rock, pop
- Instrument: Vocals
- Years active: 1978–present
- Labels: EMI Poland; Sony Poland
- Website: www.beatakozidrak.pl

Signature
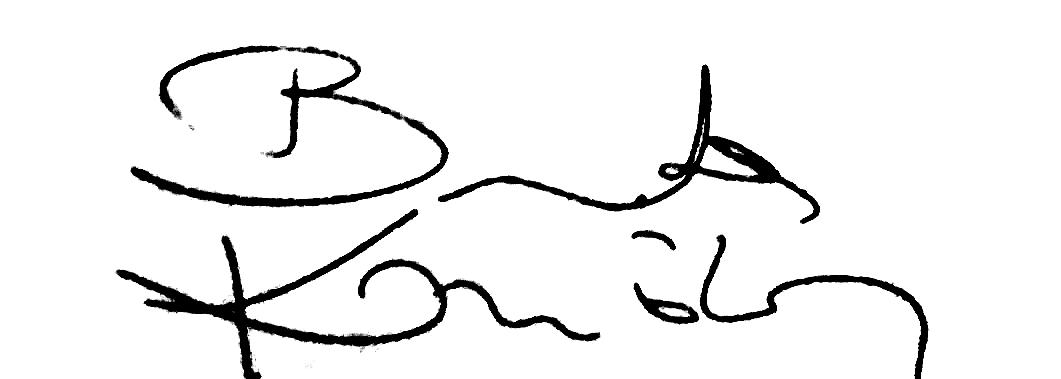

Beata Elżbieta Kozidrak (born 4 May 1960) is a Polish singer and songwriter. She is the lead singer and lyricist for the Polish pop-rock band BAJM. She is one of the most popular singers in Poland. She has a four-octave vocal range and reaches the whistle register.

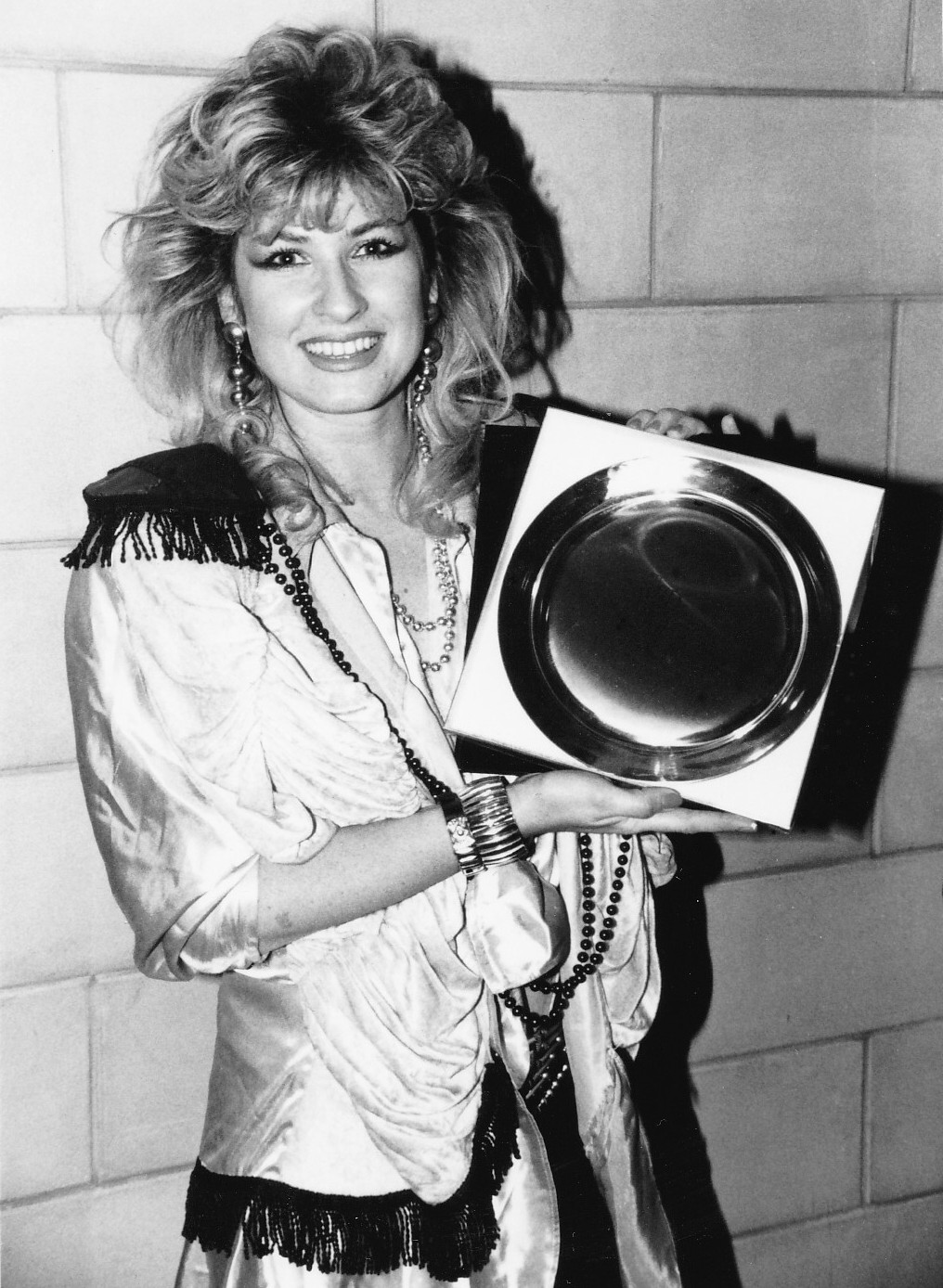
Kozidrak after winning the Midnight Sun Song Festival in Lahti, 1989

== Career ==
Her career began in 1978, when she was placed second at the National Festival of Polish Song in Opole, performing the song Piechotą do lata, as a member of Bajm band.

== Personal life ==
She is the youngest of three siblings. She has a sister, Mariola, and had a brother, Jarosław Kozidrak. In childhood, she lived at 36A Grodzka Street in Lublin.

She is an ex-wife of Andrzej Pietras (married from 1979 until 8 July 2016), co-founder and manager of the Bajm band, with whom she has two daughters: Katarzyna (born 7 December 1981) and Agata (born 22 September 1993).

== Discography ==
=== Solo albums ===
Year	Album details	Peak chart positions	Certifications
Year	Album details	POL	Certifications
1998	Beata: Released: 18 June 1998; Label: Pomaton EMI; Formats: CD, digital download	—	POL: 2× Platinum
2005	Teraz płynę: Released: 21 November 2005; Label: Pomaton EMI; Formats: CD, digital download	1	POL: 2× Platinum
2016	B3: Released: 16 September 2016; Label: Sony Music Entertainment Poland; Formats: CD, LP, digital download	3	POL: Gold
2023	B4: Released: 23 February 2023; Label: Sony Music Entertainment Poland; Formats: CD, digital download	28	
"—" denotes a recording that did not chart or was not released in that territory.

=== Compilation albums ===
Year	Album details	Peak chart positions
Year	Album details	POL
2006	Platynowa: Released: 22 May 2006; Label: EMI Music Poland; Formats: CD	21

== Awards ==
- 1986 – Grand Prix at the Baltic States Song Festival in Karlshamn, Sweden with the song Diament i sól
- 1987 – Grand Prix at the Midnight Sun Festival in Lahti, Finland with the song Hurry My Love
- 1999 – two Fryderyk awards: Best Vocalist and Best Pop Album (Beata)
- 2001 – Fryderyk, "Vocalist of the Year"
- 2006 – Złote Dzioby, Radio WAWA, "Album of the Year"
- 2015 – Amber Nighnigale Lifetime Achievement Award at the Polsat SuperHit Festival
- 2019 – Icon of Culture Award presented by the Wprost magazine
- 2020 – Woman of the Year presented by the Glamour magazine
