= Wilki =

Polish rock band

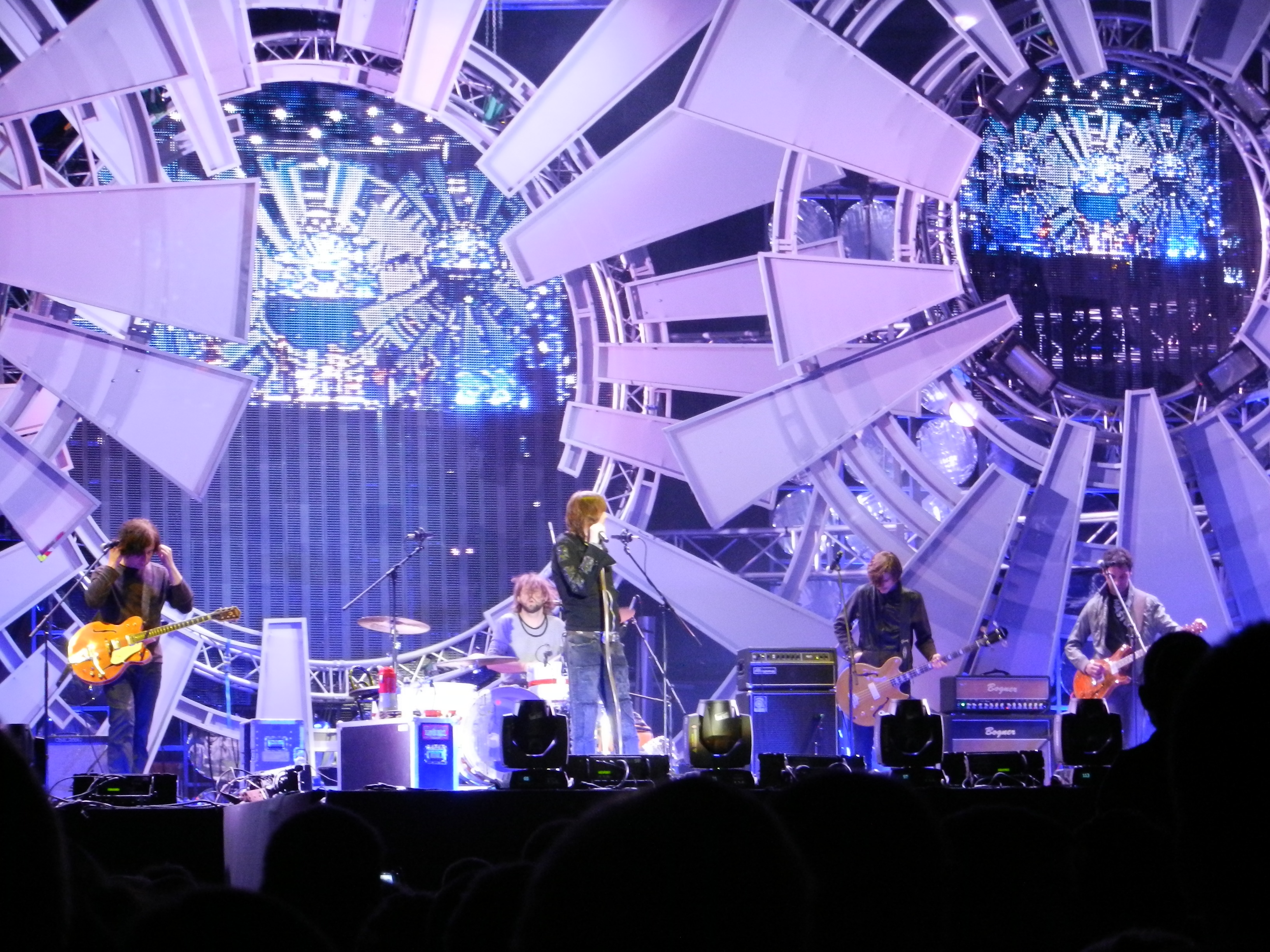
- Wilki in 2011

Background information
- Origin: Warsaw, Poland
- Genres: Alternative rock, pop rock
- Years active: 1991–1995; 2001–2009; 2011–present
- Labels: MJM Music PL, Pomaton EMI, EMI Music Poland, Sony Music Entertainment Poland
- Members: Robert Gawliński; Mikis Cupas; Emanuel Gawliński; Maciej Gładysz; Adam Kram; Beniamin Gawliński

Wilki (Wolves) are a Polish alternative/pop rock band from Warsaw.

Wilki have written songs both in English and Polish. They are currently signed to Sony Music in Poland.

== Discography ==
=== Studio albums ===
Title	Album details	Peak chart positions	Sales	Certifications
Title	Album details	POL	Sales	Certifications
Wilki	Released: May 8, 1992; Label: MJM Music PL; Formats: CD, digital download	39		
Przedmieścia	Released: 1993; Label: MJM Music PL; Formats: CD, digital download	—		
4	Released: August 31, 2002; Label: Pomaton EMI; Formats: CD, digital download	1	POL: 70,000+	POL: Platinum
Watra	Released: November 6, 2004; Label: Pomaton EMI; Formats: CD, digital download	1		
Obrazki	Released: November 10, 2006; Label: EMI Music Poland; Formats: CD, digital download	11		
Światło i mrok	Released: November 6, 2012; Label: Sony Music Entertainment Poland; Formats: CD, digital download	12		
Przez dziewczyny	Released: April 15, 2016; Label: Wilki S.C.; Formats: CD, digital download	6		
"—" denotes a recording that did not chart or was not released in that territory.

=== Live albums ===
Title	Album details	Peak chart positions	Sales	Certifications
Title	Album details	POL	Sales	Certifications
Acousticus Rockus	Released: October 14, 1994; Label: MJM Music PL; Formats: CD, digital download	—		
Wilki Live	Released: November 18, 2002; Label: Sony Music Entertainment Poland; Formats: CD	32		
MTV Unplugged	Released: June 5, 2009; Label: EMI Music Poland; Formats: CD, digital download	8	POL: 15,000+	POL: Gold
"—" denotes a recording that did not chart or was not released in that territory.

=== Compilation albums ===
Title	Album details	Peak chart positions
Title	Album details	POL
Największe przeboje	Released: October 30, 2000; Label: Sony Music Entertainment Poland; Formats: CD, digital download	28
"—" denotes a recording that did not chart or was not released in that territory.

== Band members ==
Current:

- Robert Gawliński - lead vocal, guitars (1991-present)
- Mikis Cupas - guitars (1991-present)
- Maciej Gładysz - guitars (2011 - present)
- Beniamin Gawliński - guitars, keyboards (2014 - present)
- Adam Kram - drums (2019 - present)
- Emanuel Gawliński - bass guitar (2019 - present)

Former:

- Michał Rollinger - keyboards (1992)
- Dariusz Nowak - drums (1991)
- Adam Żwirski - bass guitar (1991; died in 1991)
- Marek Chrzanowski - bass guitar (1992-2001)
- Andrzej Smolik - keyboards, piano, harmonica, accordion, organ, guitars, flute (1993-2011)
- Leszek Biolik - bass guitar (2005 - 2011)
- Marcin Szyszko - drums (1992-2006; died in 2013)
- Stanisław Wróbel - bass guitar (2011 - 2014)
- Hubert Gasiul - drums (2006-2019)
- Marcin Ciempiel - bass guitar (2002-2005, 2014-2019)
