= Milówka, Silesian Voivodeship =

Milówka
- Village
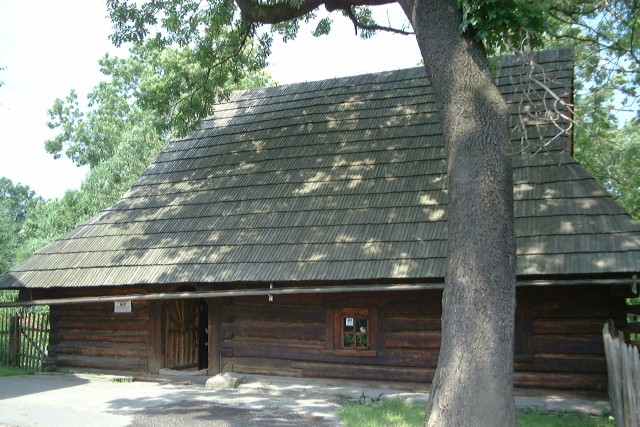
- Museum in an old wooden house

- Coat of arms

- Location within Poland
- Coordinates: 49°33′47″N 19°05′15″E
- Country: Poland
- Voivodeship: Silesian
- County: Żywiec
- Gmina: Milówka

Government
  - Sołtys: Sławomir Salamon
- Population: 4,300
- Time zone: UTC+1 (CET)
  - Summer (DST): UTC+2 (CEST)
- Postal code: 34-360
- Car plates: SZY
- Website: http://www.milowka.pl

Milówka [miˈlufka] is a village in Żywiec County, Silesian Voivodeship, in southern Poland (historic province of Lesser Poland). It is the seat of the gmina (administrative district) called Gmina Milówka. Polish musical group Golec uOrkiestra hails from here.

Milówka was first mentioned in 1537, when this part of the Kingdom of Poland belonged to Lesser Poland's Kraków Voivodeship. Mountains and hills of the Beskids, which were covered by dense forests, were at that time settled by Polish farmers, who gradually moved southwards along the Soła river. After the Poles, in the second half of the 16th century, came shepherds from Wallachia, who in the course of the time assimilated with Polish population. In 1772 (see Partitions of Poland) Milówka was annexed by the Austrian Empire, and became part of the province of Galicia, where it remained until late 1918. According to the Austrian census of 1900, the village had a population of 2,678, with 93% Catholics, and 6.5% Jews. Until 1975 Milówka was administratively tied with Kraków (with the exception of World War II, when it was directly annexed into the Third Reich). Among points of interest there is a Regional Museum, with a wooden peasant house from 1739, and a parish church (1834).
