= Thessaloniki – Yannena with Two Canvas Shoes =

Thessaloniki - Yannena With Two Canvas Shoes

Studio album by Goran Bregović and George Dalaras
- Released: 1997
- Label: EMI

Goran Bregović chronology
Düğün ve Cenaze with Sezen Aksu (1997)	Thessaloniki - Yannena With Two Canvas Shoes (1997)	Silence of the Balkans (1998)

Thessaloniki - Yannena With Two Canvas Shoes is an album by Goran Bregović and the Greek singer George Dalaras.

== Track listing ==
1. "Sou Axize Mia Kaliteri Agalia (You Deserved A Better Love)"
2. "Ki An Se Thelo (What If I Want You)"
3. "Me Lene Popi (My Name Is Popie)"
4. "Ena Tragoudi Gia Tin Eleni F. (A Song Dedicated To Eleni F.)"
5. "Nihta (Night)"
6. "To Tragoudi Tis Vrohis (The Song Of The Rain)"
7. "Tis Agapis Sou To Risko (Your Love's Risk)"
8. "Kerna Mas (Veligradi - Hania) [Treat Us (Belgrade-Chania)]"
9. "Pou Na 'Se Tora, Anna (Don't Give Up, Anna)"
10. "Martira Ta (Lubenica) (Confess)"

The main theme of song "Pou Na 'Se Tora, Anna" reminds of another song of Goran Bregović, "Ausencia" from the album Underground, soundtrack of the film with the same title by Emir Kusturica.
