= Radkov (surname) =

Radkov (Bulgarian: Радков, feminine: Radkova) are Slavic patronymic surnames derived from slightly different given names, both of which transliterated as "Radko": Bulgarian: Радков from Радко and Russian: Радьков from Радько. The latter names can be occasionally transliterated as Rad'kov/Rad'ko. Transliterations from the Belarusian language vary: Radzkov/Radzkow/Radzkou/Radźkou/Radźkoǔ: Belarusian: Радзькоў). Notable people with the surname include:

- Alexander Radkov (born 1951), Belarusian politician
- Artsyom Radzkow (born 1985), Belarusian football player
- Daniela Radkova, Bulgarian folk singer, sister of Lyudmila
- Kostadinka Radkova (born 1962), Bulgarian basketball player
- Krasimir Radkov (born 1971), Bulgarian comedian
- Lyudmila Radkova, Bulgarian folk singer, sister of Daniela

== See also ==
- Ratkov
