= Ederlezi (song) =

Balkan Romani folk song

Song
- Language: Balkan Romani
- English title: "Hıdırellez" or "George's Day in Spring"
- Genre: Romani folk
- Songwriter: unknown

"Ederlezi" is a popular traditional folk song of the Romani people in the Balkans.

The song got its name from Ederlezi, which is a festival celebrating the return of springtime, especially by the Romani people of the Balkans, and elsewhere around the world. Ederlezi is the Romani name for the Feast of Saint George. It is celebrated on 6 May [O.S. 23 April] (occurring approximately 40 days after the spring equinox). The various Balkan spellings (Herdeljez, Erdelezi) are variants of the Turkish Hıdırellez.

== Versions ==
"Đurđevdan je, a ja nisam s onom koju volim"

Song by Bijelo Dugme

from the album Ćiribiribela
- Language: Serbo-Croatian (Bosnian)
- English title: "It's St. George's Day, and I'm Not with the One I Love"
- Released: 24 November 1988
- Recorded: September–November 1988
- Genre: Folk rock
- Length: 3:55
- Label: Diskoton; Kamarad; Komuna
- Composer: Traditional
- Lyricist: Goran Bregović
- Producer: Goran Bregović

Audio
- "Djurdjevdan" - (audio) - 1988 Diskoton on YouTube

The song is featured on Bijelo Dugme's 1988 album Ćiribiribela under the title "Đurđevdan je, a ja nisam s onom koju volim" ("It's St. George's Day, and I'm Not with the One I Love"). Goran Bregović, the founder of Bijelo Dugme, wrote the Serbo-Croatian (or Bosnian) lyrics. Bregović also recorded a version with Greek lyrics, titled "Του Αη Γιώργη" ("Tou Ai Giorgi", "Saint George's"), with Greek singer Alkistis Protopsalti in 1991. The Greek lyrics are credited to Lina Nikolakopoulou. Bregović also worked with Turkish singer Sezen Aksu on her album titled Düğün ve Cenaze (A Wedding and a Funeral) featuring a version with Turkish lyrics, titled ("Hıdrellez") in 1997. The lyrics were adapted by Aksu and Pakize Barışta. Finally, together with Polish singer Kayah, he also recorded a version with Polish lyrics, titled "Nie ma, nie ma ciebie", included in their 1999 collaborative album Kayah i Bregović. The Polish lyrics were written by Kayah herself.

Bulgarian group Ku-Ku Band, with lead singer Slavi Trifonov, released the song on several albums with Bulgarian lyrics, titled "Гергьовден" ("Gergyovden", "St. George's Day"); Serbo-Bulgarian lyrics, titled "Свети Георги" ("Sveti Georgi", "St. George"); and Romani-Serbo-Bulgarian lyrics, titled "Ederlezi". The band Beirut, Italian saxophonist Daniele Sepe, and the Boston-based band Bury Me Standing also do covers of "Ederlezi". The Gypsy Rebels of Toronto, Ontario also cover the song, featuring the vocals of Micheal T. Butch and his band. Kroke released a version of the song as well.

In 2012, Bulgarian singer Sofi Marinova released a version fully in Romani titled "Ederlezi".

A Bosnian version was released by the folk-punk musical group No Smoking Orchestra on their 2007 album Time of the Gypsies, Punk Opera. A beatbox/trip version was released by French band "Plume Tribu" on their 2010 album Le Chainon Manquant.

== In popular culture ==
Goran Bregović's version titled "Ederlezi (Scena Đurđevdana na rijeci)" was famously used in Emir Kusturica's movie Time of the Gypsies (1988). It was performed by the Macedonian singer Vaska Jankovska.

"Ederlezi (Scena Đurđevdana na rijeci)" also appeared in the 2006 film Borat, although it has no connection to the authentic music of Kazakhstan. The text in brackets in Serbo-Croatian means: "The scene of Đurđevdan on the river", a description of a Đurđevdan celebration on a river in Time of the Gypsies where that song was used. Sacha Baron Cohen's film does not feature a Đurđevdan river scene. In both soundtrack albums – Time of the Gypsies and Stereophonic Musical Listenings That Have Been Origin in Moving Film "Borat: Cultural Learnings of America for Make Benefit Glorious Nation of Kazakhstan" – it was credited to Goran Bregović, although he is not the author nor the singer of the song on these albums. However, he arranged the song.

A.I. Rising (2018), a Serbian science fiction film, was originally entitled Ederlezi Rising.

A portion of "Ederlezi (Scena Đurđevdana na rijeci)" was also featured in Lazy Square's unofficial "Russian art film" reimagining of The Simpsons popular opening sequence "couch gag" by Alex (Aleksei) Semenov, also known as Lenivko Kvadratjić.

Ederlezi is used as OST for the map "Outpost" in Wargaming's video-game, World of Tanks (2010). This version is composed by Andrey Kulik and Ivan Kucherenko, with beats by Ilya Tereshchuk and vocals by Aleksey Vanchuk.

In 2019, "Ederlezi" was released in a new version by Vanillaz, Divolly & Markward. This modern reinterpretation combined traditional melodies with contemporary electronic production, bringing the classic tune to a wider and younger audience.

== Lyrics ==
Lyrics in Romani
English translation
Bijelo Dugme's cover
English translation

Sa me amala oro khelena
Oro khelena, dive kerena
Sa o Roma daje
Sa o Roma babo babo
Sa o Roma o daje
Sa o Roma babo babo
Ederlezi, Ederlezi
Sa o Roma daje

Sa o Roma babo, e bakren chinen
A me, chorro, dural beshava
Romano dive, amaro dive
Amaro dive, Ederlezi

E devado babo, amenge bakro
Sa o Roma babo, e bakren chinen
Sa o Roma babo babo
Sa o Roma o daje
Sa o Roma babo babo
Ederlezi, Ederlezi
Sa o Roma daje

All my friends are dancing the oro
Dancing the oro, celebrating the day
All the Roma, mother
All the Roma, father, father
All the Roma, oh, mother
All the Roma, dad, dad
Ederlezi, Ederlezi
All the Roma, mother

All the Roma, dad, slaughter lambs
But, poor me, I sit far away
A Romani day, our day
Our day, Ederlezi

A lamb, father, is given to us
All the Roma, father, slaughter lambs
All the Roma, father, father
All the Roma, oh, mother
All the Roma, father, father
Ederlezi, Ederlezi
All the Roma, mother

Proljeće na moje rame slijeće
Đurđevak zeleni
Đurđevak zeleni
Svima osim meni

Drumovi odoše a ja osta'
Nema zvijezde danice
Nema zvijezde danice
Moje saputnice

Ej, kome sada moja draga
Na đurđevak miriše
Na đurđevak miriše
Meni nikad više

[Chorus] E-e-e-e!
Evo zore evo zore
Bogu da se pomolim
Evo zore evo zore
Ej đurđevdan je
A ja nisam s onom koju volim

[Chorus 2x]

Njeno ime neka se spominje
Svakog drugog dana
Svakog drugog dana
Osim đurđevdana

[Chorus]

A ja nisam s onom koju volim
A ja nisam s onom koju volim

Spring is landing on my shoulder
Lily of the valley is sprouting
Lily of the valley is sprouting
For everyone, except for me

The roads are gone, but I've stayed
There is no Morning Star
There is no Morning Star
My fellow-traveler

Hey, to whom does my darling now
Smell of the lily of the valley
Smell of the lily of the valley
To me never again

[Chorus] Here comes the dawn,
here comes the dawn
So I can pray to God
Here comes the dawn,
here comes the dawn
Hey it's St George's day
And I am not with the one I love

[Chorus]

Let her name be mentioned
On every other day
On every other day
Except on St George's day

[Chorus 2x]

And I am not with the one I love
And I am not with the one I love

Greek cover
English translation
Bulgarian cover
English translation

Απ' τους ώμους να, η Άνοιξη περνά,
γύρω φτερουγίζει,
ξεχνάει εμένα.
Μέρα της χαράς ποια ζωή φοράς;
Δρόμο δρόμο παίρνεις
χωρίς εμένα.

Του ουρανού πουλιά πάρτε με αγκαλιά
το βουνό γεμίζει κεριά αναμμένα
Nα κι η Πούλια ξημερώνει το Θεό παρακαλώ
μα το φως που δυναμώνει
δε μου φέρνει
δε μου φέρνει
'κείνον που αγαπώ.

Το όνομα του ανθός, ευωδιάς βυθός,
πείτε στα κορίτσια να μην το λένε
μέρα σαν κι αυτή στ' Άη Γιωργιού τ' αφτί,
που όλα τα τραγούδια για αγάπη κλαίνε.

Look over the shoulders, spring passes,
flutters all around,
it forgets me
Day of joy, which life do you carry?
Υou take the road
without me.

Birds of sky, take me in your embrace
the mountain fills with lit candles
There it is the morning star, it’s breaking, I beg God
but the light which becomes stronger
it doesn’t bring me
it doesn’t bring me
the man that I love.

His name (is) flower, depth of perfume
tell to the girls not to say that
On the day like this one, at Saint George’s ear
where all the songs weep for love.

Пролетта на рамото ми кацна,
жива и зелена,(x2)
скоро е Гергьовден.
Слънце пак мечтите съживява,
млади и горещи,(x2)
скоро е Гергьовден.

Припев:
Е-е-е-е-е-е-е Свети Георги ще помолим
с нас по пътя да върви,
Свети Георги, тебе молим е-е-е-е
дай ни сила с наш'та орис пак да се преборим!

Други пътища ще ни повикат,
заедно ще тръгнем,(х2)
дойде ли Гергьовден.
И над нас звезди ще се посипят,
мъката ще скрият,(х2)
дойде ли Гергьовден.

Припев: (х3)

Spring is now upon my shoulders,
Lively and green,(x2)
St. George's day will be here soon.
The Sun revives our dreams again,
young and passionate,(x2)
St. George's day will be here soon.

Chorus:
E-e-e-e-e To St. George we're gonna pray
to guide us on our path ,
St. George, we beg you e-e-e-e-e-e
give us strength to overcome our bad fate once again!

Other path will be laid in front of us,
we will go together,(x2)
when St. George's day is here.
And stars will strew over us,
they will hide our sorrows,(x2)
when St. George's day is here.

Chorus: (x3)

Turkish cover
English translation
Polish cover
English translation

Bahar oldu aman
Al kese astım gül dalına
Adadım yarin adına
İki göz oda.

Dağ yeşil, dallar yeşil
Uyandılar bayrama
Her gönül şen
Bir benim bahtım kara.

Kokuyor buram buram
Fulyalar vakit tamam
Bir bana uğramadı
Bu bahar bayram.

Ağlama hıdrellez
Ağlama be bana
Acı ektim yerine
Aşk yeşerecek, yeşerecek
Başka bahara.

Ne yolu var ne izi
Tanıdık değil yüzü
Dilerim Allah'tan
Aşk sözün özü.

Sevdiğim yok, eşim yok
Ağardı bir gün daha
Ey benim şans yıldızım
Gülümse bana.

The spring has come,
I've put up a red pouch on a rose's branch,
I've vowed a house with two rooms
In the name of the lover

The mountain is green, the branches are green
They woke up for the bayram
All hearts are happy
Only my fate is black

Jonquils are smelling everywhere,
It's time.
This spring, I'm the only one
To whom bayram has not confronted

Don't cry hıdrellez
Don't cry for me
I've sowed pain, and instead of it,
Love will sprout, will sprout
In another spring.

He/She has neither a way (known) nor a trace
His/Her face is not familiar
The long and short of it,
My wish from the God is, love.

I don't have anyone I love, I don't have a spouse
One more day has dawned.
O my star of luck!
Smile to me

Zima na ramiona moje spadła
Niewinnością białym śniegiem
Pierwsza gwiazda już na niebie
Nie ma nie ma ciebie

Ogień tańczyć zaczął już w kominie
A choinka się zieleni
Serca ludziom opromieni
Moje w kamień zmieni

Śnieg zasypał dzisiaj wszystkie drogi
Niewinnością białym płaszczem
Twoich śladów nie wypatrzę
Nie mam cię na zawsze

Hej moje góry i doliny
Widziałyście może dziś
Dokąd odszedł mój jedyny
Hej Bóg się rodzi
Moc truchleje
Nie ma nie ma ciebie

Hej moje góry i doliny
Odpowiecie może mi
Dokąd odszedł mój jedyny
Hej Bóg się rodzi
Moc truchleje
Nie ma nie ma ciebie

The winter has fallen on my shoulders
With the innocence and white snow
First star has blazed on the sky
You are not, you are not here,

The fire already started dancing in the chimney
Christmas tree greens,
It will brighten people’s hearts
Mine will be turned into stone

Snow has covered all the roads
With the innocence and white coat
I will not see your traces
I do not own you forever

Oh, my mountains and valleys
Perhaps you have seen
Where has my dear gone
Oh, God is being born
The Powers tremble
You are not, you are not here

Oh my mountains and valleys
Perhaps you can tell me
Where has my dear gone
Hey, God is being born
The Powers tremble
You are not, you are not here

== See also ==
- Romani music

== Literature ==
- Janjatović, Petar (2003). Ex YU rock enciklopedija (Ex YU Rock Encyclopedia). Beograd: Čigoja štampa. COBISS 137175308.
