= Goran Bregović (album) =

Studio album by Goran Bregović
- Released: 1976
- Genre: Rock, folk
- Label: PGP RTB

Goran Bregović is a self-titled album by Bijelo dugme's frontman Goran Bregović, released in 1976 in-between the band's second (Šta bi dao da si na mom mjestu) and third (Eto! Baš hoću!) studio albums.

Although the title and sleeve announce it as a solo Bregović record, album Goran Bregović is actually a conceptual smorgasbord of different new and recycled material. It consists of:

- five Bregović-composed songs that were never previously released or recorded. They were recorded specifically for this album with Zdenka Kovačiček, Bisera Veletanlić, Jadranka Stojaković (2 songs), and Milić Vukašinović on vocal
- two already released Bijelo dugme songs (arranged in a slightly different manner this time and re-recorded with Jadranka Stojaković, and Zdravko Čolić on vocals, respectively, instead of the band's singer at the time Željko Bebek),
- four Bebek-sung tracks, recorded 4 years earlier in 1972 during Bijelo dugme's previous incarnation as Jutro. Two of those tracks were already released in 1973 on Jutro's single and the other two were being heard by the wider public for the first time on this album.

== Track listing ==
=== "Ti nikad nećeš znati srce jedne žene" ===
(You Will Never Know a Woman's Heart)

Track entirely prepared by Bregović, and recorded in 1976 with Bijelo dugme's lineup at the time - the only change being Zdenka Kovačiček on vocal instead of Željko Bebek who moved to guitar to tighten the sound.

- lyrics, music and arrangement: Goran Bregović
- vocal: Zdenka Kovačiček
- guitar: Goran Bregović
- guitar: Željko Bebek
- keyboards: Vlado Pravdić
- bass: Zoran Redžić
- drums: Ipe Ivandić

Thirty four years later in 2010, the song was remixed by the Serbian techno act sevdahBABY and released on their album Ganc novi funk!.

=== "Šta ću nano, dragi mi je ljut" ===
(What Am I Going To Do, Granny, My Darling Is Angry)

Entirely prepared by Bregović, the track was recorded under his guidance in 1976 by Bisera Veletanlić on vocal, together with Dragi & Žika Jelić of YU grupa, Laza Ristovski of SMAK, and Raša Đelmaš.

- lyrics, music and arrangement: Goran Bregović
- vocal: Bisera Veletanlić
- guitar: Goran Bregović
- guitar: Dragi Jelić
- keyboards: Laza Ristovski
- bass: Žika Jelić
- drums: Raša Đelmaš

Eight years later the track was re-recorded with Tifa on vocal, and repackaged on Bijelo dugme's 1984 album Kosovka djevojka as "Lipe cvatu", which went on to become a huge hit and one of the band's signature songs.

=== "Čekala sam" ===
(I've Been Waiting)

Another track entirely prepared by Bregović, and recorded in 1976 with Bijelo dugme's lineup at the time - the only modification being Jadranka Stojaković on vocal instead of Željko Bebek who moved to guitar.

- lyrics, music and arrangement: Goran Bregović
- vocal: Jadranka Stojaković
- guitar: Goran Bregović
- guitar: Željko Bebek
- keyboards: Vlado Pravdić
- bass: Zoran Redžić
- drums: Ipe Ivandić

The song never gained much attention upon its release on this album, but enjoyed an unexpected revival sixteen years later when director Srđan Dragojević used it in his 1992 hit movie Mi nismo anđeli. In the film, the song is performed by actors Srđan Todorović and Uroš Đurić as their characters Angel and Devil, respectively, in a memorable night club scene. The song also appears in the movie's 2005 sequel Mi nismo anđeli 2.

=== "Ko zna reći" ===
(Who Knows To Say)

Entirely prepared by Bregović, and recorded in 1976 with Bijelo dugme's lineup at the time - the only change being Jadranka Stojaković on vocal instead of Željko Bebek who moved to guitar.

- lyrics, music and arrangement: Goran Bregović
- vocal: Jadranka Stojaković
- guitar: Goran Bregović
- guitar: Željko Bebek
- keyboards: Vlado Pravdić
- bass: Zoran Redžić
- drums: Ipe Ivandić

=== "Kad bi' bio bijelo dugme" ===
(If I Were A White Button)

Re-release of the 1972 Jutro recording, which had already been released as a two-side single in 1973.

- text, music and arrangement: Goran Bregović
- vocal: Željko Bebek
- guitar: Goran Bregović
- bass: Zoran Redžić
- drums: Gordan Matrak

=== "Ima neka tajna veza" ===
(There's A Secret Connection)

An all acoustic re-recording of Bijelo dugme's hit track. The track's original version was already released as A-side on the band's 1975 two-side single "Ima neka tajna veza" / "I kad prodje sve, pjevat ću i tad" and was now re-recorded specifically for this album in a slightly different arrangement with Jadranka Stojaković on vocal instead of Željko Bebek.

- lyrics: Duško Trifunović
- music and arrangement: Goran Bregović
- vocal and harmonica: Jadranka Stojaković
- acoustic guitar: Goran Bregović
- contrabass: Miša Blam

=== "Na vrh brda vrba mrda" ===
(A Willow Moves On The Top Of A Hill)

- lyrics, music and arrangement: Goran Bregović
- vocal: Željko Bebek
- guitar: Goran Bregović
- bass: Zoran Redžić
- drums: Šento Borovčanin

=== "Ja i zvezda sjaj" ===
(Me And Starlight)

- lyrics: Milić Vukašinović
- music: Goran Bregović
- vocal: Milić Vukašinović
- guitar: Goran Bregović
- bass: Zoran Redžić
- drums: Milić Vukašinović

=== "U subotu, mala" ===
(At Saturday, Baby)

Re-release of the 1972 Jutro recording, which had already been released as a two-sided single in 1973.

- lyrics and music: Ismet Arnautalić
- arrangement: Goran Bregović
- vocal: Željko Bebek
- guitar: Ismet Arnautalić
- guitar: Goran Bregović
- bass: Zoran Redžić
- drums: Gordan Matrak

=== "Hop cup" ===
(Oopsie Daisy)

- lyrics, music and arrangement: Nikola Borota / Goran Bregović
- guitar: Goran Bregović
- vocal: Željko Bebek
- keyboards: Vlado Pravdić
- bass: Zoran Redžić
- drums: Perica Stojanović

== 1999 re-release ==
The album was re-released in 1999 by PGP RTS on the CD format, containing exactly the same track listing with a slightly different sleeve that includes some biographical info about Goran Bregović, Bijelo dugme and the circumstances in which the original album was conceived in 1976.
