= Radkov =

Radkov may refer to:

== Places in the Czech Republic ==
- Radkov (Jihlava District), a municipality and village in the Vysočina Region
- Radkov (Opava District), a municipality and village in the Moravian-Silesian Region
- Radkov (Svitavy District), a municipality and village in the Pardubice Region
- Radkov (Tábor District), a municipality and village in the South Bohemian Region
- Radkov (Žďár nad Sázavou District), a municipality and village in the Vysočina Region

== People ==
- Radkov (surname)
