= Silence of the Balkans =

Live album by Goran Bregović
- Released: 1998
- Recorded: December 30, 1997
- Label: Mercury

Silence of the Balkans is a live Goran Bregović album recorded in Thessaloniki, Greece on December 30, 1997. Bregović's performance was part of that city's final showcase as the 1997 European Capital of Culture.

== Silence of the Balkans ==
It's called the 'Silence of the Balkans' but actually is the record of the sounds, the rhythm and the breath of the Balkans and Georgia, but in different interpretation. A train leaves from the old railway station of Munich and by passing all Balkan countries, stops in various cities and arrives in Thessaloniki. The last train stop, Thessaloniki, is also the last stop of the Cultural Capital of Europe, Thessaloniki 1997.

The performance has 2 levels. One that is live inside the stadium, and one film recorded in each train stop by Boris Miljković. At the performance of the last song, 3 children (one from Serbia, one Muslim and one from Croatian) from an orphanage in Sarajevo, call for peace.

Live performances from: the Municipal Orchestra of Thessaloniki (47 people), the Choir of Thessaloniki (50 people), 4 Bulgarian singers that work with Bregović in all lives performances, the Bulgarian dance ensemble 'Filip Kutev), 45 dancers from Greece, a polyphonic group from Albania, the former Yugoslavia singer Zdravko Čolić, the group of Aristidis Moshos.

== Track listing ==
1. Silence 1
2. Delicious Solitude
3. Train
4. Silence 2
5. Wedding
6. Ederlezi
7. Silence 3
8. Chupchik
9. Babylon
10. Green Thought
11. Silence 4
12. Mocking Song

== Notes ==
The second track in this album uses fragments of Andrew Marvell's poem "The Garden".

The end of the third track features the traditional Georgian songs "Tsin Tskaro" and "Sisa Tura".
