= Ratkov =

Ratkov (feminine: Ratkova) are Slavic patronymic surnames derived from slightly different given names, both of them transliterated as "Ratko": Serbian: Ратков from Ратко and Russian: Ратьков from Ратько. The latter names can be occasionally transliterated as Rat'kov/Rat'ko and may originate from the Russian noble Ratkov families. Notable people with the surname include:

== Ратков ==
- Aleksandar Ratkov, Serbian basketballer
- Petar Ratkov, Serbian footballer

== Ратьков ==
- Avram Ratkov (1773-1829), Imperial Russian general
- Vladimir Ratkov-Rozhnov (1834 – 1912), Russian public figure, senator, entrepreneur, and industrialist
- Nikolay Ratkov-Rozhnov (1826-1917) Imperial Russian vice-admiral

== See also ==
- Ratková, village and municipality in Slovakia
- Radkov (disambiguation)
