= Tales and Songs from Weddings and Funerals =

Studio album by Goran Bregović
- Released: 2002
- Label: Mercury
- Producer: Goran Bregović

Tales and Songs from Weddings and Funerals is a solo album released in 2002 by Goran Bregović, a Balkan composer known for making music for films.

== Track listing ==
1. Hop Hop Hop (lead vocal: Šaban Bajramović)
2. Tale I (Grave Disperato) / For wind orchestra and clock
3. Aven Ivenda (lead vocal: Vaska Jankovska)
4. Sex (lead vocal: Šaban Bajramović)
5. Tale II (Adagio Poco Febrile) / For wine glasses and strings
6. Maki Maki (lead vocal: Šaban Bajramović)
7. Tale III (Lento Arabesco) / For Zdravko Čolić and the Georgian Male Choir
8. So Nevo Si (lead vocal: Ljudmila Radkova, Danijela Radkova, Lidija Dakova, Dejan Pešić, Srđan Pejić, Ogi Radivojević, Goran Bregović)
9. Tale IV (Moderato Melancolico) / For violin, cow horn, harp and strings
10. Cocktail Molotov (lead vocal: Goran Demirović)
11. Tale V (Andante Amoroso) / For Eb clarinet and orchestra
12. Polizia Molto Arabbiata (lead vocal: Goran Demirović)
13. Tale VI (Adagio Delicato) / For wine glasses and strings
14. Te Kuravle (lead vocal: Vaka Jankovska)
15. Tale VII (Vivo Con Fuoco) / Scherzo for gypsy orchestra
