= Time of the Gypsies / Kuduz – Soundtrack =

Album by Goran Bregović

Time of the Gypsies / Kuduz - Soundtrack

Soundtrack album by Goran Bregović
- Released: 1988

A soundtrack by Goran Bregović for Emir Kusturica's 1988 film Time of the Gypsies (Dom za vešanje). Also includes two tracks by Bregović from Ademir Kenović's 1989 film Kuduz.

== Track listing ==
1. Ederlezi
2. Scena pojavljivanja majke
3. Scena Perhanove pogibije
4. Kustino oro
5. Borino oro
6. Glavna tema
7. Tango
8. Pjesma
9. Talijanska
10. Ederlezi

Several of the pieces in the soundtrack to the film can also be heard in the movie Borat.

== Certifications ==
Region	Certification	Certified units/sales
France (SNEP)	Gold	100,000^{*}
^{*} Sales figures based on certification alone.
