= Goran Bregović's Karmen with a Happy End =

Studio album by Goran Bregović
- Released: 2007
- Label: Mercury

Goran Bregović's Karmen with a Happy End is a concept album by Goran Bregović. It was composed in 2004.

== Track listing ==
1. Uvertira
2. Gas Gas
3. Savatone
4. Mashala Mashala
5. Dikh Mo Vast
6. Pampur Galbeno
7. Stop
8. Ne Siam Kurve Tuke Sijam Prostitutke
9. Lumia Sitoj I Gurumni
10. Soske Murseske Manglape Kurva
11. Focu di Raggia
12. Me Sam Devla Romani
13. Koferi
14. Bijav
15. Lamour
