= Boris Miljković =

Serbian filmmaker and writer

Boris Miljković Борис Миљковић
- Born: 3 April 1956 (age 70); Zagreb, PR Croatia, FPR Yugoslavia
- Years active: 1980–present

Boris Miljković (Serbian-Cyrillic: Борис Миљковић; born 3 April 1956 in Zagreb, PR Croatia, FPR Yugoslavia) is a Serbian film director, screenwriter, creative director in advertising and writer.

== Biography ==
Boris Miljković studied Film directing at the Department of Film and TV Directing of the Faculty of Dramatic Arts of Belgrade's University of Arts and graduated with diploma. Together with Branimir Dimitrijević, he became part of the creative duo Boris & Tucko and was co-author and co-director of numerous TV shows and films during the eighties, including Niko kao ja (Nobody Likes Me; children's TV series, 1981), Rokenroler (Rock'n'Roller; 1980), Ruski umetnički eksperiment (The Russian Artistic Experiment; 1982) and Šumanović - Komedija umetnika (Šumanović - Comedy of an Artist; 1987). A section of his contemporary video work was introduced at exhibitions of the Museum of Modern Art (MoMA) and the Contemporary Arts Museum Houston in 1989.

In the nineties, he worked as creative director in advertising for Saatchi and Saatchi Cairo and McCann Erickson Belgrade in cooperation with Srđan Šaper. The artist was creator of video impressions of the performance Silence of the Balkans which was the final event of Thessaloniki – European Capital of Culture 1997. In recent decades, he has created several hundred television advertisements, music videos and theater trailers. The film artist is also author of printed literature which is mostly edited by the publishing house Geopoetika. Miljkovic is laureate of renowned prizes such as JRT Award (1983), Prize of Monte Carlo Television Festival (1983), Clio Award (1988), MTV Award (1989), the Isidora Sekulić Award 2002 for his prose Tea Time in Zamalek, the UEPS Award 2007 and the Golden Maple Award (category tourism film) of Jahorina Film Festival 2016. In 2021 his novel The Yugoslavs was shortlisted for NIN Award for the Best Novel of the Year.

In 2003, he directed Slobodan Šnajder’s Nevjesta od vjetra (The Bride of the Wind) at National Theatre Belgrade and Stravinsky's Prica o vojniku (The Soldier's Tale) at Atelje 212 Theatre two years later. He was appointed artistic director for the conceptual realization of the Eurovision Song Contest 2008. In 2017, he was one of the initiators of the Serbian MTS Vision Festival. Miljković has been creative director at Radio Television of Serbia (RTS) for many years.

== Bibliography (selection) ==
- Čaj na Zamaleku (Tea Time in Zamalek), short stories, Geopoetika, Belgrade 2002, ISBN 86-83053-86-5.
- Fabrika hartije (Paper Factory), short stories, Geopoetika, Belgrade 2003, ISBN 86-7666-014-X.
- Uspavanka za Lalu (Lullaby for Lala), novel, Geopoetika, Belgrade 2004, ISBN 86-7666-048-4.
- Poljupci, sećanja i razgovori (Kisses, Memories and Conversations), novel, Geopoetika, Belgrade 2006, ISBN 86-7666-104-9.
- Život u raju (Life in Heaven), short stories, Samizdat B92, Belgrade 2016, ISBN 978-86-7963-434-4.
- Kuvar, Šta mladi umetnik može da nauči od advertajzera, mašine, budale? (What can a young artist learn from an advertiser, a machine, a fool), novel, Geopoetika, Belgrade 2013, ISBN 978-86-6145-140-9.
- Jugosloveni (The Yugoslavs), novel, Geopoetika, Belgrade 2020, ISBN 978-86-6145-358-8.
- Duboka nostalgija (Deep Nostalgia), novel, Geopoetika, Belgrade 2023, ISBN 9788661454110.

== Filmography (selection) ==
=== Film ===
- Ruski umetnički eksperiment (The Russian Artistic Experiment), Television film (1982)
- Šumanović – Komedija umetnika (Šumanović – Comedy of an Artist), Television film (1987)
- #SamoKažem (#JustSaying), co-author, Web series (2013)
- Fabrika šećera (Sugar factory ), Film (2015)
- Homecoming - Marina Abramovic and Her Children (Homecoming - Marina Abramovic and Her Children ), Film (2020)
- Snovi od papira, Film (2023)
- Da Capo (Da Capo Zubin Mehta ), Film (2024)
- Goranka’s time (Goranka - Goranka Matić), Film (2025)

=== Docuseries ===
- Fabrika šećera (Sugar Factory), Documentary film series, RTS (2016)
- Put u budućnost (Way to the Future), Documentary film series, RTS (2017)
- Umetnost buke (Art of Noise), Documentary film series, RTS (2019)
- Kreativne industrije (Creative Indusrties), Documentary film series, RTS (2022)
- Utopija (Utopia), Documentary film series, RTS (2024)
- O ljubavi i gađenju (About Love and Loathing), Documentary film series, RTS (2024)

=== Theatre productions ===
- Slobodan Šnajder, Nevjesta od vjetra, Director of National Theatre Belgrade (2003)
- Dejan Mijač, Pseći valcer, Video Material of Yugoslav Drama Theatre (2004)
- Biljana Srbljanović, Skakavci, Trailer of Yugoslav Drama Theatre (2005)
- Dejan Mijač, Uglješa Šajtinac, Pseći valcer, Creative director of Yugoslav Drama Theatre (2007)

=== Video advertisement ===
- Telekom Srbija, BizNet, MTS (2007)
- Telekom Srbija, MTS – Imate prijatelje!, Ensemble Kolo (2007)
- Creative Center for Tourism, Art and Culture, Jedinstvena zemlja nadomak nas... (The unique country near us...), Kovačica (2016)
- RTS, Rio 2016 – Team Serbia (PTCreative Belgrade)
- Idea, Za koga ti kuvaš?

=== Music video ===
- Šarlo akrobata, Niko kao ja (1981)
- Idoli, Maljčiki (1981)
- Laibach, Across The Universe (1989)
- Kanda, Kodža i Nebojša, Kafane i rokenrol (2010)
- Nina, Čaroban, Song of the Eurovision Song Contest 2011
- Grupa Regina, Kalimero (2014)
