= Arizona Dream (soundtrack) =

Soundtrack album by Goran Bregović
- Released: 1993
- Genre: Soundtrack
- Length: 46:08
- Label: Mercury Records

Arizona Dream is the soundtrack album from the 1993 film of the same name directed by Emir Kusturica. The soundtrack was written by Goran Bregović and features original contributions from vocalist/lyricist Iggy Pop, also uses three songs of jazz guitarist Django Reinhardt.

== Song facts ==
Pop sang and wrote lyrics for tracks 1, 4 & 6. Pop sang on track 10, which had lyrics written by Kusturica.

The song "This Is a Film" quotes a character from the novel Chevengur by a Russian writer Andrei Platonov: "He would show Zakhar Pavlovich the eyes of a dead fish and say, 'Look-there's wisdom! A fish stands between life and death, so that he's dumb and expressionless. I mean even a calf thinks, but a fish, no. It already knows everything". Kusturica acknowledged this in one of his interviews

The melody of "Dreams" is a variation of the traditional Macedonian traditional song "Zajdi, zajdi, jasno sonce" ("Set, Set, Oh, Bright Sun").

The melody of "Gypsy Reggae" is a variation of the song "The Streets of Cairo" by James Thornton.

"Get the Money" is an English-language cover of "Hajdemo u planine" ("Let's Go to the Mountains") by Bregović's band Bijelo Dugme from their 1986 album Pljuni i zapjevaj moja Jugoslavijo.

== Track listing ==
All music is composed by Goran Bregović.

No.	Title	Lyrics	Length
1.	"In the Deathcar"	Iggy Pop	5:13
2.	"Dreams"		3:34
3.	"Old Home Movie"		5:04
4.	"TV Screen"	Pop	5:19
5.	"7/8 & 11/8"		4:52
6.	"Get the Money"	Pop	4:52
7.	"Gunpowder"		4:46
8.	"Gypsy Reggae"		3:03
9.	"Death"		5:13
10.	"This Is a Film"	Emir Kusturica	4:14

== Certifications ==
Region	Certification	Certified units/sales
France (SNEP)	2× Gold	200,000^{*}
^{*} Sales figures based on certification alone.
