= Goran Bregović =

Bosnian musician and composer (born 1950)

- Горан Бреговић
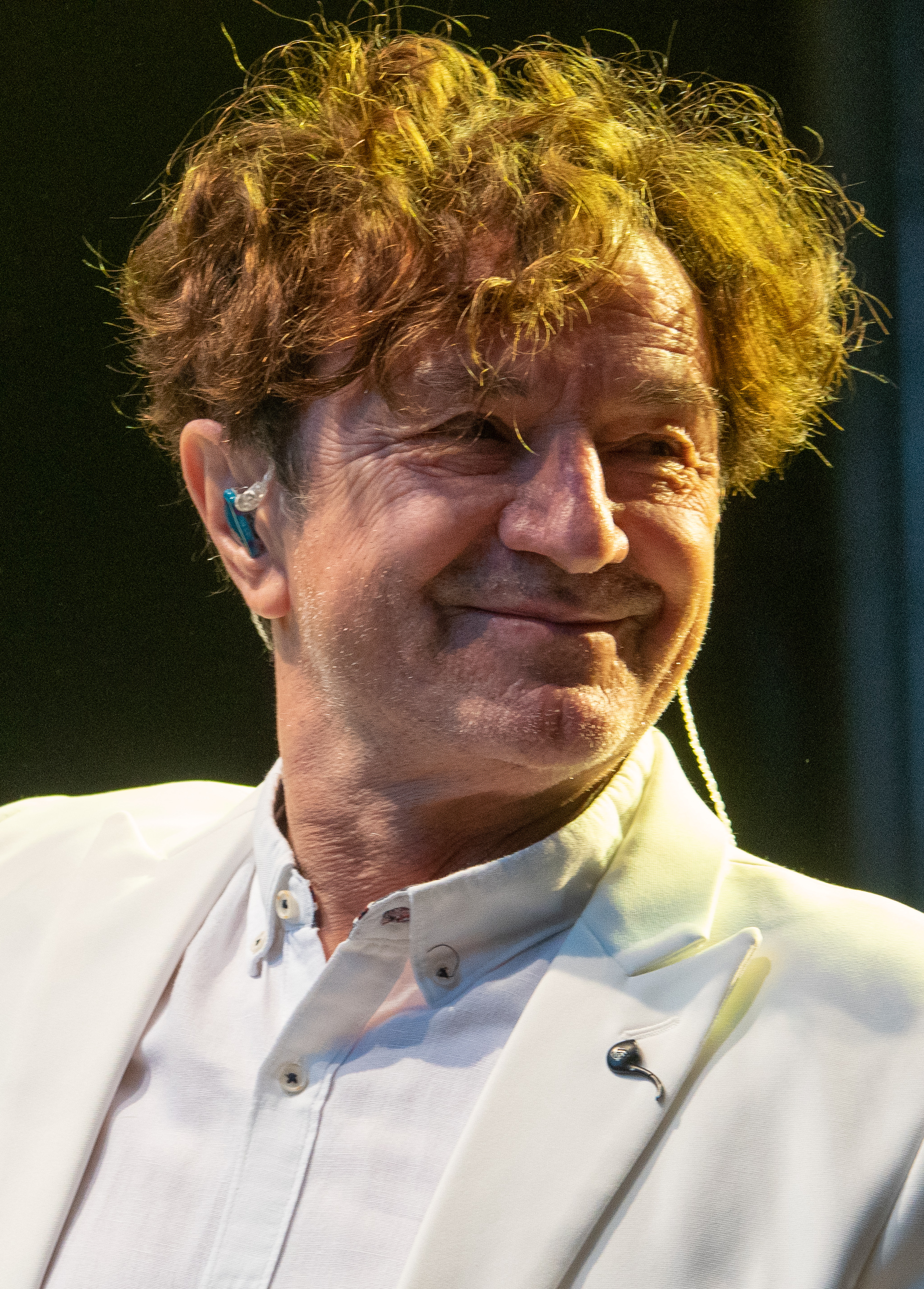
- Bregović in 2022
- Born: 22 March 1950 (age 76); Sarajevo, PR Bosnia and Herzegovina, FPR Yugoslavia
- Other name: Brega
- Occupations: Musician; songwriter; composer; film score composer
- Years active: 1969–present
- Spouse: Dženana Sudžuka (m. 1993)
- Children: 4
- Relatives: Radojica Perišić (maternal uncle)
- Musical career
- Genres: Rock; jazz rock; folk rock; world; film score; Balkan folk
- Instruments: Vocals; guitar; bass; percussion
- Member of: Bijelo Dugme
- Formerly of: Kodeksi; Jutro
- Website: www.goranbregovic.rs

Goran Bregović (Serbo-Croatian Cyrillic: Горан Бреговић; born 22 March 1950) is a recording artist from Bosnia and Herzegovina. (Note: Goran Bregović was born in Sarajevo, PR Bosnia and Herzegovina, then a republic of Yugoslavia. His father was an ethnic Croat, while his mother was Serb. He is a Bosnian and Serbian citizen. A Yugo-nostalgic, after the war he said that he "could only be a Yugoslav". He has stated that he "is not enough Serb to be a Serb, nor enough Croat to be a Croat, and not even Bosnian enough".) He is one of the most internationally known modern musicians and composers of the Slavic-speaking countries in the Balkans, and one of the few former Yugoslav musicians who have performed at major international venues such as Carnegie Hall, Royal Albert Hall and l'Olympia.

A Sarajevo native, Bregović started out with the bands Kodeksi and Jutro, but rose to prominence as the main creative mind and lead guitarist of Bijelo Dugme, widely considered one of the most popular and influential recording acts ever to exist in the SFR Yugoslavia. After Bijelo Dugme split up, he embarked on several critically and commercially successful solo projects, and started composing film scores. Among his better known film scores are three of Emir Kusturica's films (Time of the Gypsies, Arizona Dream and Underground). For Silent Gunpowder, Bregović won the Golden Arena for Best Film Music at the 1990 Pula Film Festival, among other awards. He has also composed for the Academy Award-nominated film La Reine Margot and the Cannes-entered film The Serpent's Kiss.

During his five-decade career, Bregović has composed for critically acclaimed singers, including Sezen Aksu, Kayah, Iggy Pop, Šaban Bajramović, George Dalaras, Cesária Évora and Severina.

== Early life ==
Born in Sarajevo, PR Bosnia and Herzegovina, FPR Yugoslavia to a Croat father Franjo Bregović and a Serb mother Borka Perišić, Goran grew up with two younger siblings—brother Predrag and sister Dajana. Their father was from the Croatian region of Prigorje, specifically the village of Sveti Petar Čvrstec near Križevci, while their mother was born in Virovitica to parents that had shortly before her birth arrived in the nearby village of Čemernica, settling there from the village of Kazanci near Gacko in East Herzegovina.

Goran's maternal grandfather fought in the Royal Serbian Army at the Salonica front during World War I and as a reward received land in Slavonia, where he soon moved his family. When the World War II in Yugoslavia began, Goran's grandfather joined the Yugoslav Partisans, and his grandmother, two uncles, aunt and mother were taken to the Jasenovac concentration camp, where at the gate of the camp they were exchanged for some captured Germans. The family arrived in Serbia whilst his grandmother supported the children throughout the war by smuggling tobacco from Herzegovina. She jumped off the train before entering the Belgrade train station. Goran's maternal uncle was the Serb priest and Chetnik leader Radojica Perišić (1906 – April 1945), one of the main leaders of the June 1941 uprising in eastern Herzegovina during World War II. During the war he was commander of the Chetnik Gacko Brigade, who were the first guerrilla force in Nazi-occupied Europe to liberate territory. Perišić was killed by the Ustashas in April 1945.

Franjo Bregović fought on the Partisan side during World War II. Shortly after the war, he attended a Yugoslav People's Army (JNA) military school in Virovitica, a town where he met Goran's mother, Borka. Franjo Bregović soon landed his first job, teaching ballistics at a military school in Sarajevo, so the couple moved there. Goran, their first child, was born in 1950 in Sarajevo.

Goran was ten years old when his parents divorced. In later interviews, he mentioned his father's alcoholism as the reason for the breakdown of their marriage. Soon after the split, his father moved to Livno, taking Goran's younger brother Predrag with him while Goran remained living with his mother in Sarajevo, visiting his father and brother every summer in Livno. Their father soon retired and eventually moved back to his home village in Hrvatsko Zagorje while Goran's brother Predrag later moved back to Sarajevo for university studies.

Goran played violin in a music school. However, deemed untalented, he was expelled during second grade. His musical education was thus reduced to what his friend taught him until Goran's mother bought him his first guitar in his early teens. Bregović wanted to enroll in a fine arts high school, but his aunt told his mother that it was supposedly full of homosexuals, which precipitated his mother's decision to send him to a technical (traffic) school. As a compromise for not getting his way, she allowed him to grow his hair long.

== Early career ==
Upon entering high school, teenage Bregović joined the school band Izohipse, where he began on bass guitar. Soon, however, he was kicked out of that school too (this time for misbehavior – he crashed into a school-owned Mercedes-Benz). Bregović then entered grammar school and its school band Beštije (again as a bass guitar player). When he was 16, his mother left him and moved to the coast, meaning that other than having a few relatives to rely on, he mostly had to take care of himself. He did that by playing folk music in a kafana in Konjic, working on construction sites, and selling newspapers.

Spotting him at a Beštije gig in 1969, Željko Bebek invited eighteen-year-old Bregović to play bass guitar in his band Kodeksi, which Goran gladly accepted.

=== Kodeksi ===
Eventually, Kodeksi shifted setup so Bregović moved from bass to lead guitar, resulting in Kodeksi having the following line-up during summer 1970: Goran Bregović, Željko Bebek, Zoran Redžić and Milić Vukašinović. All of them would eventually become members of Bijelo Dugme at some point in the future. At the time, they were largely influenced by Led Zeppelin and Black Sabbath. During the fall of 1970, this resulted in the departure of Željko Bebek, who (both as rhythm guitar player and singer) got phased out of the band. At the end of the year, Goran's mother and Zoran's brother arrived in Naples and took them back to Sarajevo.

=== Jutro ===
In the autumn of 1971, Bregović enrolled at the University of Sarajevo's Faculty of Philosophy, studying philosophy and sociology. He soon quit, however. At the same time, Milić Vukašinović left for London, so Bregović formed a band with Nuno Arnautalić called Jutro (Morning), which Redžić soon joined as well. Over the next few years, the band changed line-ups frequently, and on 1 January 1974 modified its name to Bijelo Dugme ("White Button").

== Bijelo Dugme ==
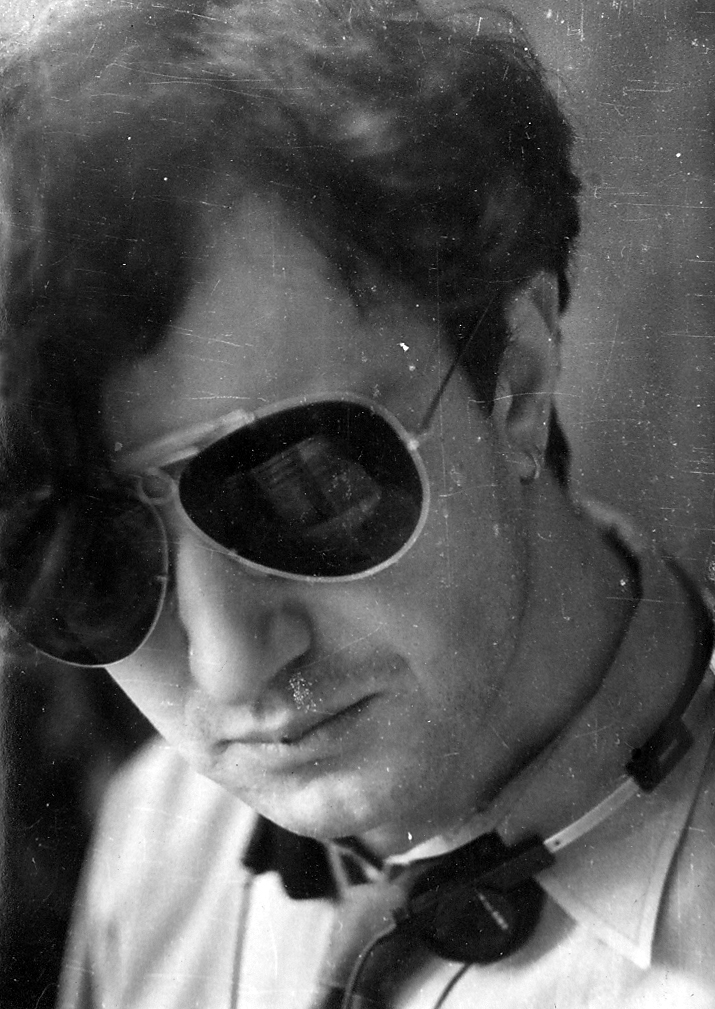
Bregović in 1980 during Bijelo Dugme's new wave phase

From 1974 to 1989, Bregović played lead guitar and was the main creative force behind Bijelo Dugme. For years they stood as one of the most popular bands in SFR Yugoslavia. Just as with Jutro previously, he continued as Bijelo Dugme's undisputed leader and decision-maker as well as its public face in the Yugoslav print and electronic media once the band started taking off commercially.

Over the band's fifteen-year run, in addition to their enormous popularity at home, led by Bregović, Bijelo Dugme made several attempts at expanding their prominence outside of Yugoslavia. In late 1975, while recording their second album, Šta bi dao da si na mom mjestu, in London, they additionally recorded an English language track called "Playing the Part" (translated version of their Serbo-Croatian track "Šta bi dao da si na mom mjestu", itself an uncredited cover of Argent's 1972 track "I Am the Dance of Ages") that was packaged as a promo single for English music journalists. Never officially released for mass distribution, the track quickly fell into oblivion.

Bijelo Dugme had somewhat better luck with touring abroad, which almost entirely took place in the Eastern Bloc countries as part of their respective cultural exchange programs with SFR Yugoslavia. The band briefly toured the Polish People's Republic during April 1977, a 9-concert leg as part of the tour in support of their third album, Eto! Baš hoću!. During their 10-day Polish tour, the band played two concerts on back-to-back nights in Warsaw, followed by Olsztyn, Zielona Góra, three shows on back-to-back days in Poznań, and finally two shows on the same day in Kalisz. While in Poland, they also shot a 30-minute television special for TVP3 Katowice, a regional Katowice-based branch of the state-owned Telewizja Polska. Later that year, following the tour's culmination at a triumphant open-air concert at Hajdučka Česma in Belgrade, Bregović went to serve his mandatory Yugoslav People's Army (JNA) stint. Assigned to a Niš-based unit, the twenty-seven-year-old reported for service on 3 November 1977 and would spend the following year away from music, a period during which the band was also on hiatus.

During early 1982, as part of an event bringing together past and future Winter Olympic hosts, the band played in Innsbruck, Austria as representatives of the city of Sarajevo and SFR Yugoslavia, the site of the upcoming Winter Olympics. On return to Yugoslavia from Innsbruck, the band had its baggage confiscated by the Yugoslav customs after undeclared musical equipment was found among their luggage. Some six months later, during summer 1982, Bijelo Dugme went on an impromptu tour of the People's Republic of Bulgaria, playing 41 shows throughout the country from 15 July to 31 August 1982. Despite the tour in support of their latest studio album, Doživjeti stotu, being over for more than a year, and having no new material to promote, the band reportedly accepted the tour of Bulgaria in order to recover some of the funds they had lost after getting fined by the Yugoslav customs over the attempt to bring undeclared musical equipment into the country.

In summer 1985, following a decade of continuous rejection for tours of the Soviet Union by the cultural attaché of the Soviet embassy in Yugoslavia, Bijelo Dugme was finally approved and booked to play in Moscow on 28 July 1985, on the same bill with fellow Yugoslav rock act Bajaga i Instruktori, at a huge open-air concert at Gorky Park as part of the 12th World Festival of Youth and Students. Ahead of the show, Bregović decided to sequester the band in Budva for two weeks in order to rehearse for the Moscow show, an indication of the seriousness with which they approached this particular concert. However, once in Moscow, due to overcrowding at Gorky Park and resulting safety concerns, the event was interrupted around 10 p.m. after the Bajaga i Instruktori set before Bijelo Dugme even had a chance to take the stage. Two days later on 30 July 1985, instead at the marquee Gorky Park in central Moscow, Bijelo Dugme got to play the Dynamo Arena on the city outskirts at an unpopular noon time slot.

=== Guest appearances, collaborations and business venture ===
Between Bijelo Dugme's studio releases and tours, in-demand Bregović worked on various side projects in Yugoslavia. These included releasing a solo record in 1976 and composing two movie soundtracks—1977's Leptirov oblak and 1979's Lične stvari.

He also tried his hand at music production, producing Idoli's 1980 seven-inch single "Maljčiki" / "Retko te viđam sa devojkama" and co-producing, alongside Kornelije Kovač, Zdravko Čolić's fourth studio album, Malo pojačaj radio, in 1981.

Bregović further made guest appearances on guitar on various studio recordings by different Yugoslav pop, folk, and rock acts: Neda Ukraden's track "Tri djevojke" (together with Bijelo Dugme bandmates Vlado Pravdić and Zoran Redžić) off her 1976 album Ko me to od nekud doziva, Hanka Paldum's track "Zbog tebe" off her 1980 album Čežnja, "Ne da/ne nego i/ili" track by Kozmetika off their 1983 eponymous album, Valentino's track "Pazi na ritam" off their 1983 debut album ValentiNo1, Riblja Čorba's track "Disko mišić" off their 1985 album Istina, Merlin's 1986 album Teško meni sa tobom (a još teže bez tebe), Mjesečari track "Gdje izlaziš ovih dana" off their 1988 album One šetaju od 1 do 2, and Piloti track "Tiho, tiho" off their 1990 album Nek te Bog čuva za mene.

During his time leading Bijelo Dugme, Bregović also became involved in the financial and organizational side of the music business. In 1984, dissatisfied with their respective financial terms at the state-owned Jugoton label, Bijelo Dugme bandleader Bregović and one of Yugoslavia's biggest pop stars, Zdravko Čolić, got together to establish their own music label Kamarad, which—via a deal with state-owned Diskoton and later another newly established private label Komuna—would end up co-releasing all of Bijelo Dugme's subsequent studio albums including three of Čolić's studio albums from 1984 to 1990. Considered an unusual move at the time in a communist country with nearly across-the-board public ownership that had just recently began allowing certain modes of private entrepreneurship, starting a privately owned record label—combined with Bregović's and Čolić's high public profile in Yugoslavia—got them both a lot of additional attention in the country's press. The company was registered in Radomlje near Domžale in SR Slovenia. Due to not having its own production facilities and distribution network, the new label entered a co-releasing agreement with Diskoton, thus essentially functioning as the legal entity that holds the licensing rights to the works of Bijelo Dugme and Zdravko Čolić. Kamarad's debut co-release was Čolić's 1984 studio album Ti si mi u krvi followed by Bijelo Dugme's self-titled studio album later that year with new vocalist Mladen "Tifa" Vojičić. The label would also co-release many of Dugme's and Čolić's later best-of compilations in addition to Bregović's movie soundtrack albums as well as Vesna Zmijanac's 1992 album Ako me umiriš sad.

== Solo career ==
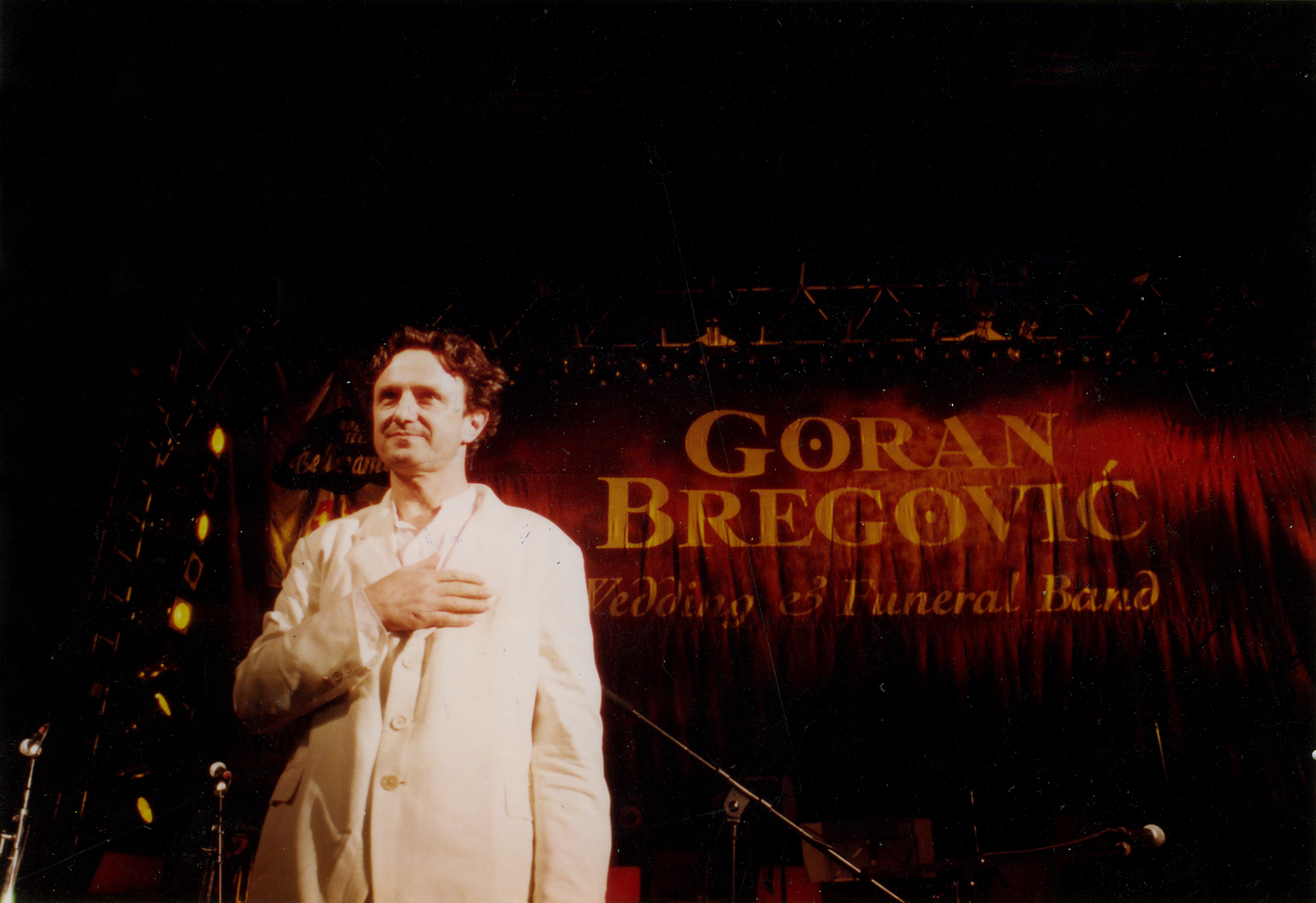
Bregović performing in Niš in 1997

During the late 1980s, a period that would turn out to be the final years of Bijelo Dugme, Bregović entered the world of film music. His first project was Emir Kusturica's Time of the Gypsies (1989) and it turned out to be a great success (both the film and the soundtrack). Bregović's collaboration with Kusturica continued as the musician composed the soundtrack (which was performed by Iggy Pop) for Kusturica's next film, Arizona Dream (1993). During the Bosnian War, Bregović relocated to Paris, but also lived in Belgrade. His next major project, music for Patrice Chéreau's Queen Margot, was a great success as well, and as a result, the film won two awards on the 1994 Cannes Film Festival. The next year's Golden Palm award went to Underground, for which Goran Bregović composed the music.

In 1997, he worked with Turkish singer Sezen Aksu on her album Düğün ve Cenaze (Wedding and Funeral). After that album, he continued making composite albums with other musicians that were based on his music and singers' lyrics.

He made an album with George Dalaras in 1999 named Thessaloniki – Yannena with Two Canvas Shoes. In the same year, Bregović recorded an album called Kayah i Bregović (Kayah and Bregović) with popular Polish singer Kayah, which sold over 700,000 copies in Poland (seven times platinum record).

In 2001, he recorded another album with another Polish singer, Krzysztof Krawczyk, titled Daj mi drugie życie ("Give Me Second Life").

In 2005, Bregović took part in three large farewell concerts of Bijelo Dugme.

A number of works created by Bregović can be heard on the soundtrack to the 2006 film Borat: Cultural Learnings of America for Make Benefit Glorious Nation of Kazakhstan, most notably "Đurđevdan". The film itself actually features more Bregović samples than the soundtrack.

Two musical numbers by Bregović, "Ne Siam Kurve Tuke Sijam Prostitutke" and "Gas, Gas", were featured in the soundtrack of the 2012 Brazilian telenovela Salve Jorge, on the television network Rede Globo.

=== Russo-Ukrainian war ===
In March 2015, Bregović performed a concert in Crimea after it was annexed by Russia in the previous year. The following month, the Life Festival in Oświęcim, Poland canceled an appearance by Bregović, saying that his statements were "contrary to the values cherished by the Life Festival founders."

In August 2023, Bregović was denied from entering Moldova on the grounds of his allegedly open support for the Russian annexation of Crimea and invasion of Ukraine. He intended to play in a music festival in the country.

In April 2025, at the recommendation of Latvia's State Security Service (VDD), Bregović has been put on the list of personae non gratae in Latvia, alongside Russian-Lithuanian singer Kristina Orbakaitė. According to the VDD, Bregović has made several appearances in "occupied Crimea" since 2014 along with "frequently expressing his support for the aggressor Russia in public, while spreading discrediting messages against Western countries". Bregović responded to the accusations by stating he comes from "a city marked by war" and he "would never support any war or aggression".

=== Wedding and Funeral Orchestra ===
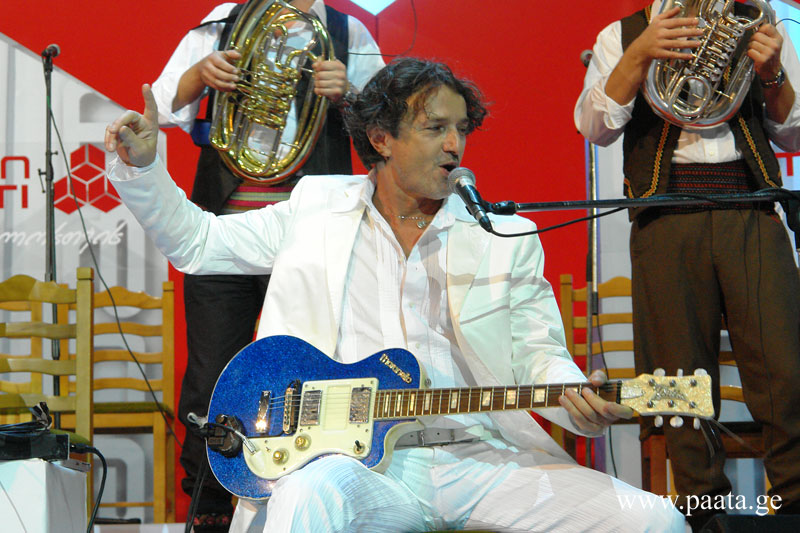
Bregović at concert in Tbilisi, Georgia, 3 October 2007

For many years Bregović performed with a large ensemble of musicians: a brass band, bagpipes, a string ensemble, a tuxedo-clad all-male choir from Belgrade, women wearing traditional Bulgarian costumes, and Roma singers make up his 40-piece band and orchestra.

Since 1998, and until about 2012, Bregović has been performing his music mainly in the form of concerts all over the world with his Wedding and Funeral Orchestra. This consists of 10 people (in the small version) or 37 (in the large version, although, in some instances, this number varies, depending on participants from the host country).

Since 2012 the orchestra consists of 9 people (in the small version) or 19 (in the large version), as it played in New York at the Lincoln Center on 15 and 16 July 2016.

The small orchestra consists of Muharem "Muki" Rexhepi (vocals, drums), Bokan Stanković (first trumpet), Dragić Velićović (second trumpet), Stojan Dimov (sax, clarinet), Aleksandar Rajković (first trombone, glockenspiel), Miloš Mihajlović (second trombone), female Bulgarian singers Daniela Radkova-Aleksandrova and Lyudmila Radkova-Traykova, and Goran himself. The large orchestra includes also string quartet: Ivana Mateijć (first violin), Bojana Jovanović-Jotić (second violin), Saša Mirković (viola), and Tatjana Jovanović-Mirković, as well as sextet of male voices: Dejan Pesić (first tenor), Milan Panić and Ranko Jović (second tenors), Aleksandar Novaković (baritone), Dušan Ljubinković and Siniša Dutina (basses).

In previous years, the following musicians have performed in the orchestra: Ogi Radivojević and Alen Ademović (vocals, drums), Dalibor Lukić (second trumpet), Dejan Manigodić (tuba), Vaska Jankovska (vocals).

In 2013, as part of his Asia-Pacific tour (including Australia, New Zealand, and Hong Kong), Bregović performed with a string quartet, a male choir, Bulgarian singers and half of a brass band. The other part of the brass band – including bass and percussions – were being played from his computer. In 2017, he was a guest artist on Puerto Rican rapper Residente's album Residente on the song "El Futuro Es Nuestro" (Spanish for "The Future is Ours").

=== Eurovision ===
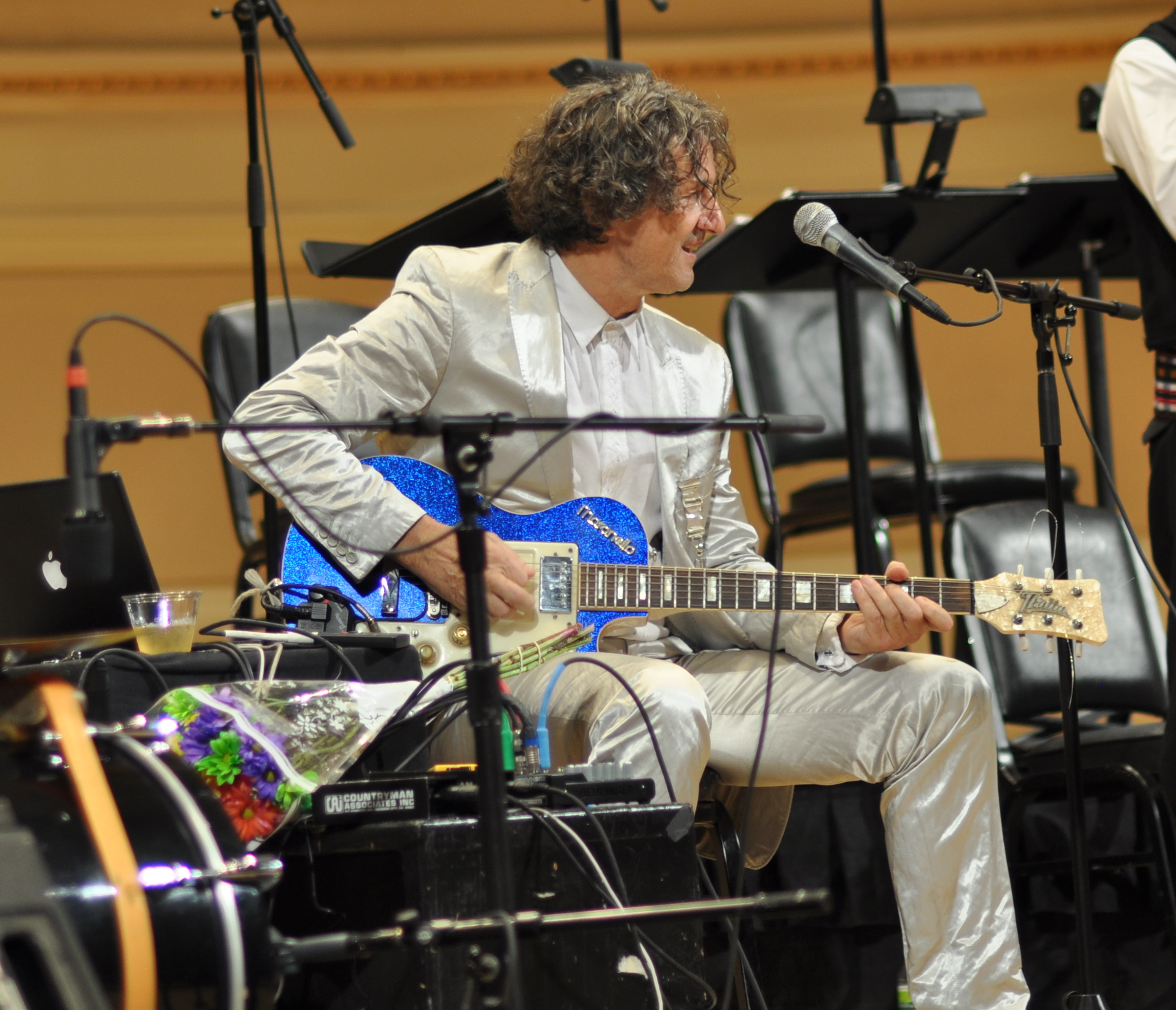
Bregović performing at Carnegie Hall in New York City, 19 October 2011

During the Eurovision 2008 final in Belgrade Arena, Serbia, he played as the interval act. He also composed the Serbian entry for the Eurovision Song Contest 2010; 'Ovo Je Balkan' sung by Milan Stanković.

== Musical style ==
Bregović's compositions, extending Balkan musical inspirations to innovative extremes, draw upon European classicism and Balkan rhythms.

Bregović's music carries Yugoslav, Bulgarian, Romani, Greek, Romanian, Albanian, Italian, Turkish and Polish themes and is a fusion of popular music, with traditional polyphonic music from the Balkans, tango and brass bands.

Bregović has frequently been accused of plagiarizing other performers' works, as well as republishing his own previously released material as new. In the mid-2000s, French singer-songwriter Enrico Macias reportedly sued Bregović over Bregović's song "In the Deathcar" off the Arizona Dream soundtrack album, claiming it plagiarized Macias' song "Solenzara". Media outlets in the Balkans reported in 2015 that the French court ruled in Macias' favour, ordering Bregović to pay Macias €1 million in damages. In response, via a press release distributed to media outlets throughout the Balkans, Bregović's representative Svetlana Strunić claimed that there never was a plagiarism court process against Bregović in France.

== Personal life ==
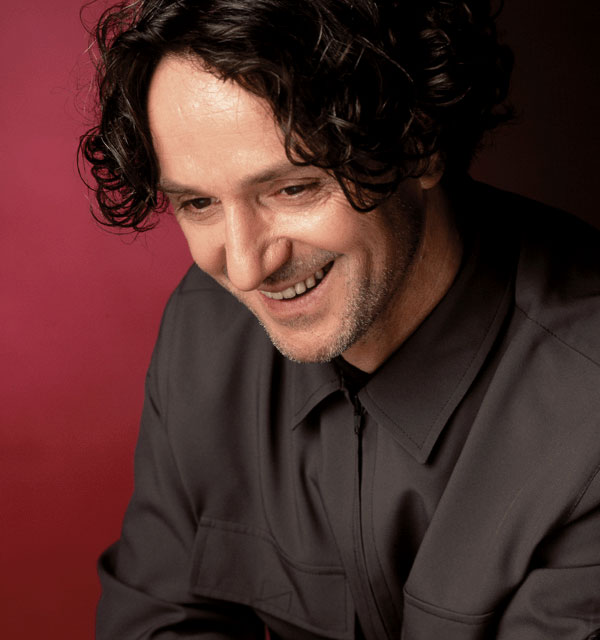
Bregović in 2007

Bregović's younger siblings, brother Predrag and sister Dajana, have lived in New York City and Split, respectively. His brother Predrag reportedly also spends time in the Syrmian village of Beška in Serbia, where he owns a vineyard. Their sister Dajana Bregović-Marić, a mother of four, died in May 2020 in Split, aged 61.

=== Marriage, relationships, and children ===
During the early 1970s, from a brief relationship with a Sarajevo-based dancer named Jasenka, Bregović's first child, daughter Željka, was born out of wedlock. Željka lives in Austria, where she gave birth to Goran's granddaughter, Bianca.

With Bijelo Dugme's mid-1970s breakout commercial success and Bregović's increased public profile in Yugoslavia, details of his lifestyle and romantic relationships also became fodder for the country's press. Throughout the late 1970s and early 1980s, various Yugoslav print media outlets documented his on-and-off relationship with Dženana Sudžuka, a Bosnian Muslim model 11 years his junior, whom he had reportedly first met in 1977 when she was sixteen, and a relationship with upstart Serbian actress Maja Sabljić, ten years his junior, whom he began dating in 1979 during the production of the docudrama Lične stvari that they were both involved with.

In 1981, Bregović started a high-profile relationship with Serbian model Ljiljana Tica, eight years his junior. Having met at an airport, the couple's long-distance relationship—Bregović lived in Sarajevo, Tica in Belgrade—was further complicated by the constant travelling as part of their respective occupations. They broke up in 1983. In later interviews, Tica revealed that she ended the relationship due to Bregović's infidelity, discovering it while calling his home phone in Sarajevo only to have Sudžuka answer it.

Eventually, in 1993, Bregović married his long-time girlfriend Sudžuka in a civic wedding ceremony held in Paris with film director Emir Kusturica as the groom's best man and longtime Bijelo Dugme backing vocalist Amila Sulejmanović as the bride's maid of honour.

The couple has three daughters: Ema (born in March 1995), Una (February 2002), and Lulu (May 2004). Since the early 1990s, when not touring, Bregović's primary residence has been in Paris, a city where he got married and his three daughters were born and raised. Additionally, he spends a lot of time in Belgrade, where he does most of his musical work. In a late-2000s interview, answering a question about where his home is, Bregović stated: "If you define 'home' as the place where you keep your winter coat during summer and your swimming trunks during winter, then my home is my Paris apartment". His daughter Ema graduated from the Saint-Nazaire Fine Arts School in Nantes and became a conceptual artist.

=== Injuries ===
On 12 June 2008, fifty-eight-year-old Bregović sustained a spinal injury in Belgrade, breaking vertebrae by falling four meters from a cherry tree in the garden of his Senjak house. After being medically assessed, his condition was stated to be "stable without neurological complications." Following surgery, he made a quick recovery and, within a month, on 8 and 9 July, held two big concerts in New York City, proving for more than two hours each night his performance skills had not suffered from the accident.

=== Political views ===
It's not accidental that both Bebek and I are members of the Communist League. Being a communist means being politically active and organized. It really gets on my nerves when I hear someone say: 'I feel like a communist, but I'm not a member [of the party]'. A politically inactive communist is not a communist. Only a politically organized communist is a real communist.

— Bregović in December 1976 on his political activity

In 1971, twenty-one-year-old Bregović—a student at the University of Sarajevo's Faculty of Philosophy—got accepted into the Yugoslav Communist League (SKJ), the only party in SFR Yugoslavia's political system.

Throughout the mid-to-late 1970s, by now a famous rock musician in SFR Yugoslavia, Bregović often publicly expressed personal support for the communist ideology while underscoring importance of being active in the party.

In 1990—with the dissolution of the SKJ and reinstatement of multi-party political system in Yugoslavia—Bregović expressed public support for Ante Marković's Union of Reform Forces of Yugoslavia (SRSJ), a centre-left social-democrat political party opposing ethnic nationalism and advocating for reform of Yugoslav communism into liberal market capitalism. Furthermore, he actively participated in the party's election campaign ahead of the general elections in the SR Bosnia and Herzegovina constituent unit of SFR Yugoslavia, lending his celebrity and contributing to the campaign in creative capacity. Despite securing public support, endorsements, and even active campaign participation from many prominent public figures in SR Bosnia and Herzegovina such as Emir Kusturica, Nele Karajlić, Branko Đurić, etc., the party got only 8.9% of the total vote.

On 2 April 1999—a week into the NATO bombing of Yugoslavia—alongside Greek performers George Dalaras, Stavros Kouyioumtzis, and Alkistis Protopsalti as well as a number of others from different parts of the Balkans, Bregović played at an anti-war open-air concert at Thessaloniki's Aristotelous Square.

In the years following the Yugoslav Wars and breakup of Yugoslavia, Bregović has described himself as Yugonostalgic. In 2009, he stated: "Yugoslavia is the intersection of so many worlds: Orthodox, Catholic, Muslim. With music, I don't have to represent anyone, except myself – because I speak the first language of the world, the one everyone understands: music."

=== Real estate ===
Bregović owns real estate all over the world, but divides most of his time between Belgrade, where he does most of his musical recording work, and Paris, where his spouse lives with their three daughters.

He reportedly owns properties in Paris, Istanbul, Belgrade, Zagreb, on Mount Jahorina, and Perast, many of which are used for commercial purposes such as touristic rentals, studio recording, and filming locations.

In Belgrade, Bregović owns multiple properties in the upscale Senjak neighbourhood. Some of his Belgrade properties in the neighbourhoods of Senjak and Dedinje were leased out as shooting locations for Serbian television series Žene sa Dedinja, Državni službenik, and Klan.

== List of film scores ==
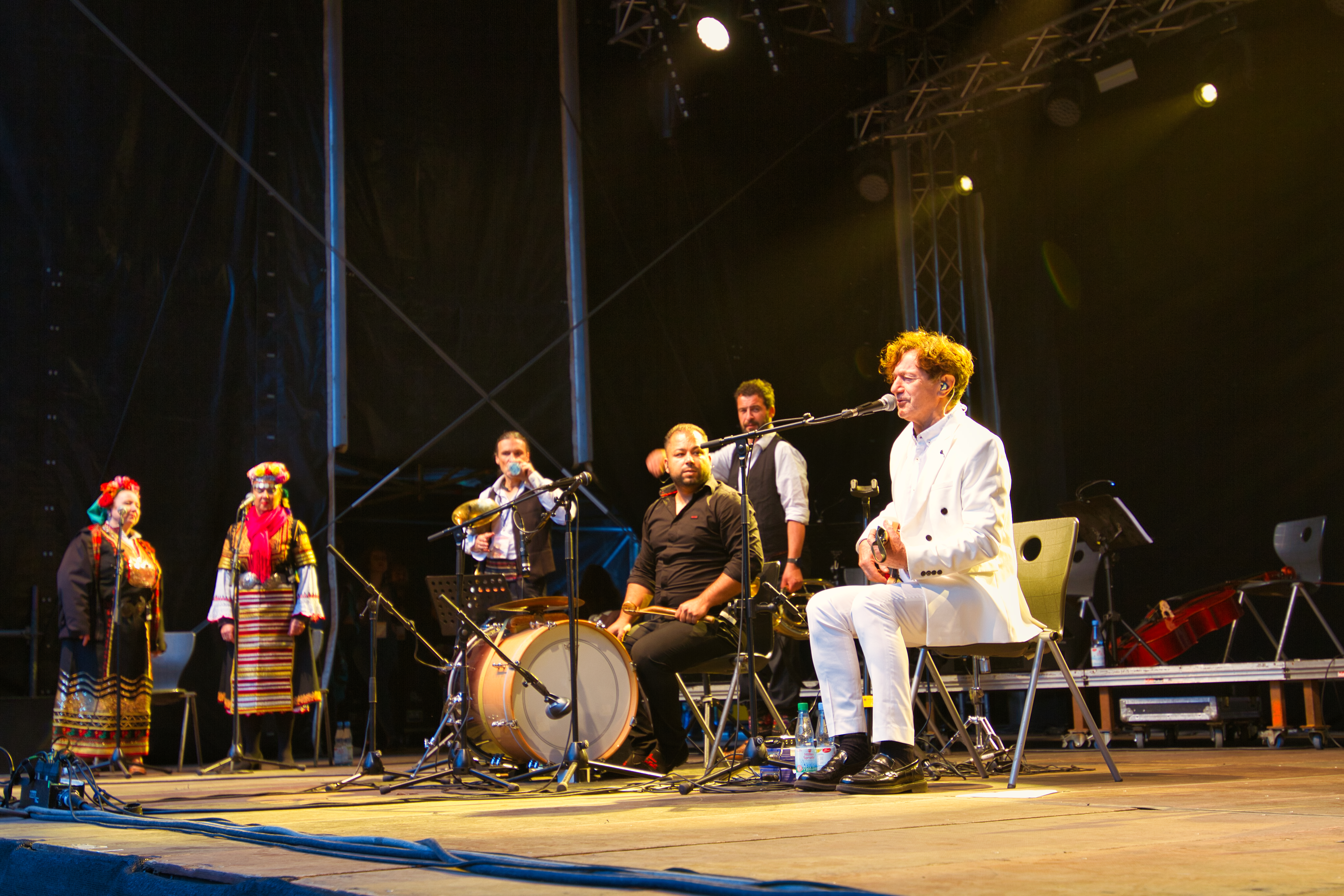
Goran Bregović Wedding and Funeral Orchestra in Rudolstadt, 10 July 2022

- 1977 – Butterfly cloud (Leptirov oblak) – Directed by: Zdravko Randić
- 1979 – Personal Affairs (Lične stvari) – Directed by: Aleksandar Mandić
- 1988 – Time of the Gypsies (Dom za vešanje) – Directed by: Emir Kusturica
- 1989 – Kuduz – Directed by: Ademir Kenović
- 1990 – Silent Gunpowder (Gluvi barut) – Directed by: Bahrudin Čengić
- 1991 – The Serbian Girl (Das Serbische Mädchen) – Directed by: Peter Sehr
- 1991 – The Little One (Mala) – Directed by: Predrag Antonijević
- 1991 – Čaruga – Directed by: Rajko Grlić
- 1993 – Arizona Dream – Directed by: Emir Kusturica
- 1993 – Toxic Affair – Directed by: Philoméne Esposito
- 1993 – La Nuit sacrée – Directed by: Nicolas Klotz
- 1993 – Le Nombril du monde – Directed by: Ariel Zeitoun
- 1993 – Kika – Directed by: Pedro Almodóvar
- 1994 – soundtrack for La Reine Margot – Directed by: Patrice Chéreau
- 1995 – Underground – Directed by: Emir Kusturica
- 1997 – Music for Weddings and Funerals (Musik för bröllop och begravningar) – Directed by: Unni Straume
- 1997 – A Chef in Love (Shekvarebuli kulinaris ataserti retsepti) – Directed by: Nana Djordjadze
- 1997 – The Serpent's Kiss – Directed by: Philippe Rousselot
- 1997 – XXL – Directed by: Ariel Zeitoun
- 1998 – Train de Vie – Directed by: Radu Mihaileanu
- 1999 – The Lost Son – Directed by: Chris Menges
- 1999 – Tuvalu – Directed by: Veit Helmer
- 1999 – Operation Simoom (Operacja Samum) – Directed by Władysław Pasikowski
- 2000 – 27 Missing Kisses – Directed by: Nana Djordjadze
- 2000 – Je li jasno prijatelju? – Directed by: Dejan Ačimović
- 2005 – The Turkish Gambit (Турецкий гамбит) – Directed by: Dzhanik Faiziyev
- 2005 – I giorni dell'abbandono – Directed by: Roberto Faenza
- 2006 – Karaula – Directed by: Rajko Grlić (This is not true)
- 2006 – Le Lièvre de Vatanen – Directed by: Marc Rivière
- 2006 – Borat: Cultural Learnings of America for Make Benefit Glorious Nation of Kazakhstan (non-original music; "Ederlezi" from Dom za vešanje)
- 2007 – Fly by Rossinant – Directed by: Jacky Stoév
- 2008 – Mustafa – Directed by: Can Dündar
- 2011 – Baikonur – Directed by Veit Helmer

== Discography ==
=== Original movie soundtracks ===
Not all his soundtracks compositions are commercially available.

- 1988: Time of the Gypsies (Kamarad, Diskoton, PolyGram, Komuna)
- 1989: Kuduz (Diskoton)
- 1993: Toxic affair (Polygram / Universal)
- 1993: Arizona Dream (Kamarad, PolyGram, Komuna)
- 1994: La Reine Margot (Kamarad, PolyGram, Komuna)
- 1995: Underground (Kamarad, PolyGram, Komuna)
- 1995: A Chef in Love (Kamarad)
- 2000: Tuvalu avec Jürgen Knieper (United One Records)
- 2005: I giorni dell'abbandono with Carmen Consoli
- 2006: Le Lièvre de Vatanen (PolyGram)
- 2008: Mustafa (Sony Music Entertainment)

=== Compilations ===
His compilations include soundtracks from different works.

- 1996: PS (Komuna)
- 1998: Ederlezi (PolyGram)
- 1999: Magic book (Bravo Records)
- 2000: Songbook (Mercury Records, Universal)
- 2000: Music for films (PolyGram)
- 2009: Welcome to Bregović (Wrasse Records)

=== Other albums ===
- 1976: Goran Bregović (PGP RTB)
- 1991: Paradehtika with Alkistis Protopsalti (Polydor)
- 1997: Düğün ve Cenaze with Sezen Aksu (Raks Müzik)
- 1997: Thessaloniki – Yannena with Two Canvas Shoes with George Dalaras (Minos-EMI)
- 1998: Silence of the Balkans, live in Thessaloniki (Mercury Records)
- 1999: Kayah & Bregović with Kayah (ZIC-ZAC)
- 2000: Balkanica with Athens Symphony Orchestra (FM Records)
- 2001: Krawczyk & Bregović Daj mi drugie życie with Krzysztof Krawczyk (BMG Poland, Rada)
- 2002: Tales and Songs from Weddings and Funerals (Mercury)
- 2007: Goran Bregović's Karmen with a Happy End (Mercury)
- 2009: Alkohol: Šljivovica & Champagne (Kamarad, Mercury)
- 2012: Ederlezi x Four (FM Records)
- 2012: Champagne for Gypsies (Kamarad, Mercury)
- 2017: Three Letters from Sarajevo, Opus 1 (Wrasse Records)

=== Guest performances ===
- 2017: "El Futuro Es Nuestro" (Residente), by Residente

== Honours and awards ==
- On 31 June 2006, he received a copy of the key of the city of Tirana by Edi Rama on the occasion of his visit to Albania.
- In 2021, he was awarded the Order of Karađorđe's Star by President Aleksandar Vučić on the occasion of Statehood Day of Serbia.

== Annotations ==
Preceded by Apocalyptica	Eurovision Song Contest; Final Interval act 2008	Succeeded by Fuerzabruta
