= Radkov (Žďár nad Sázavou District) =

- Municipality
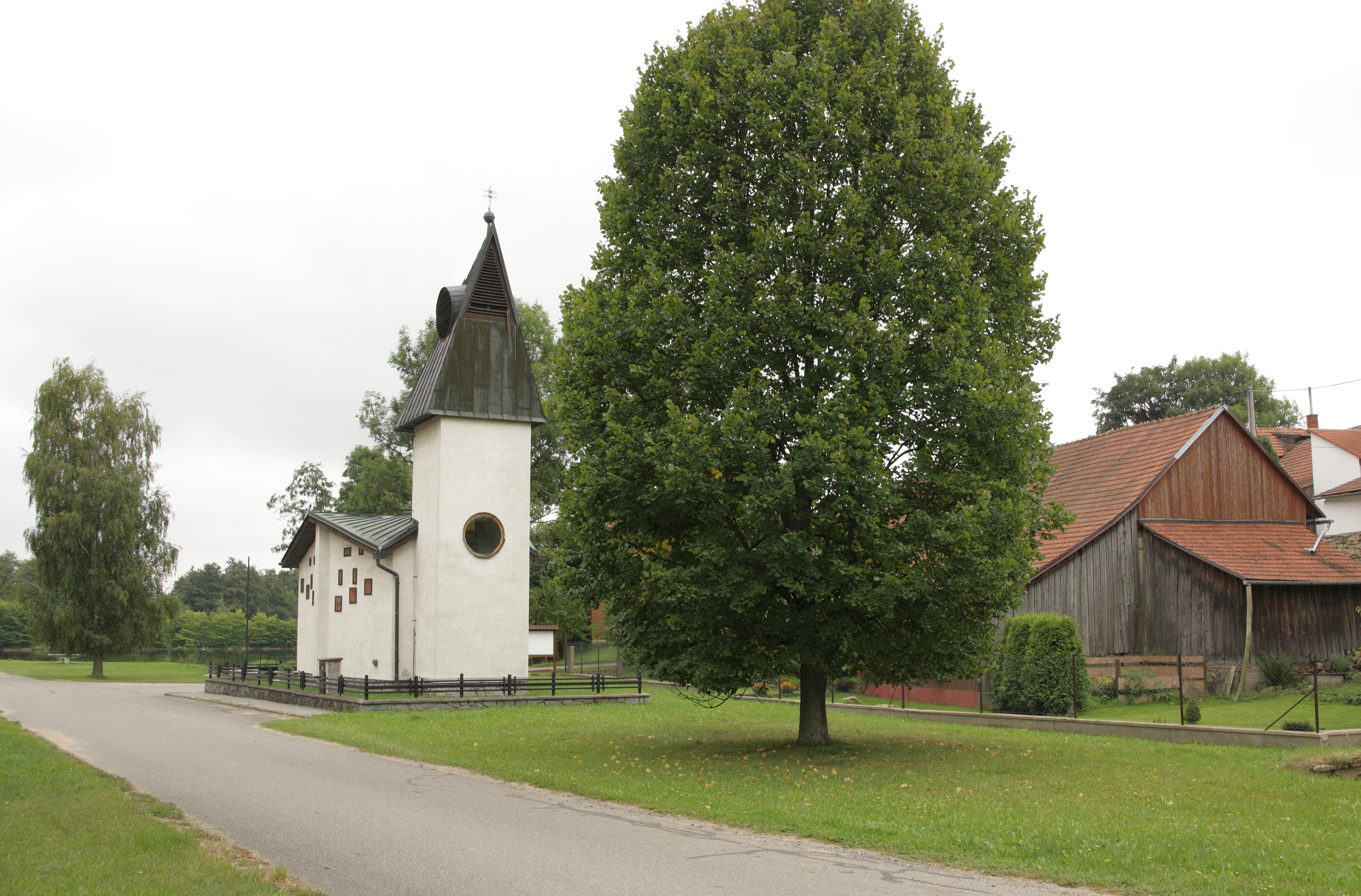
- Chapel of Saint Florian

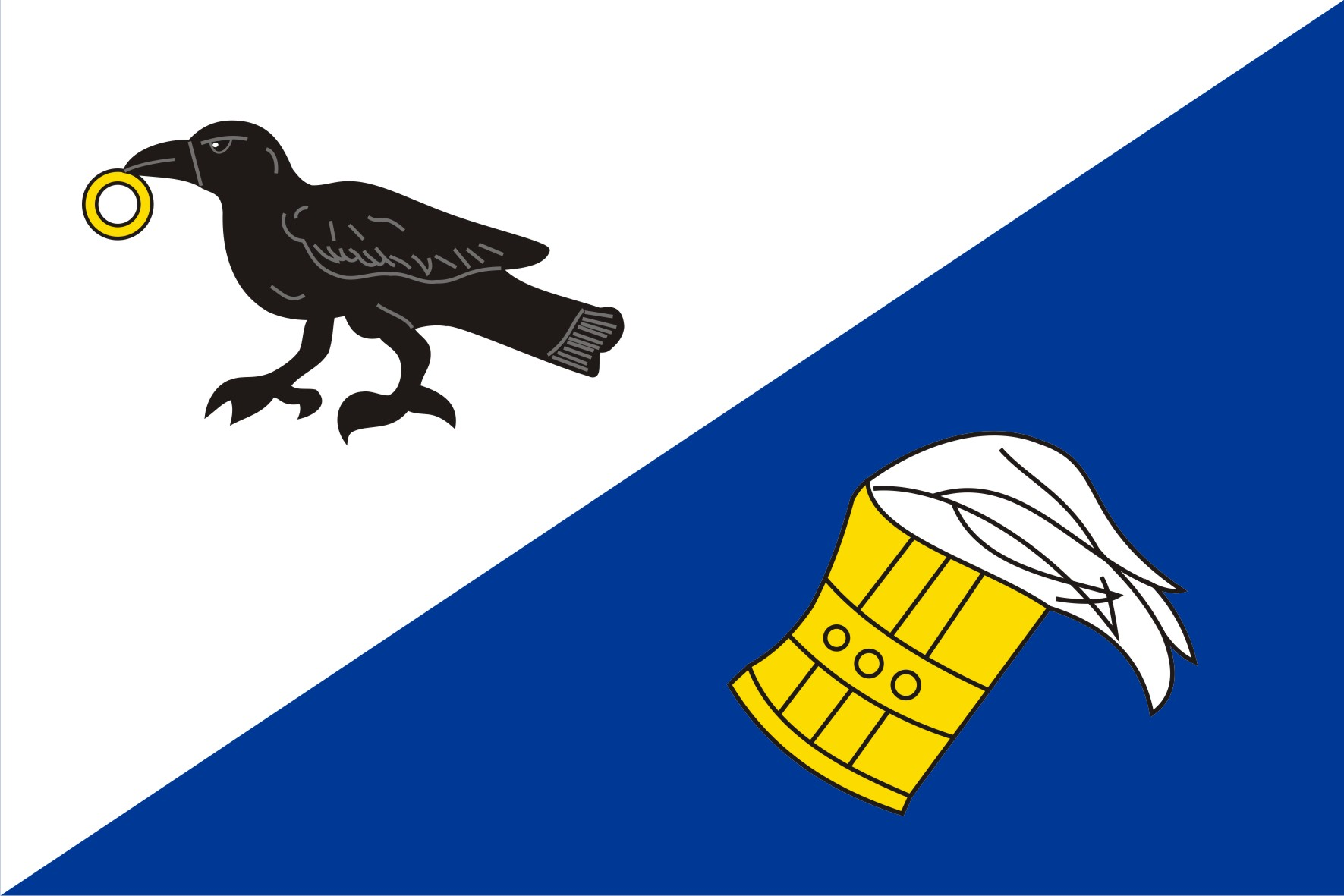
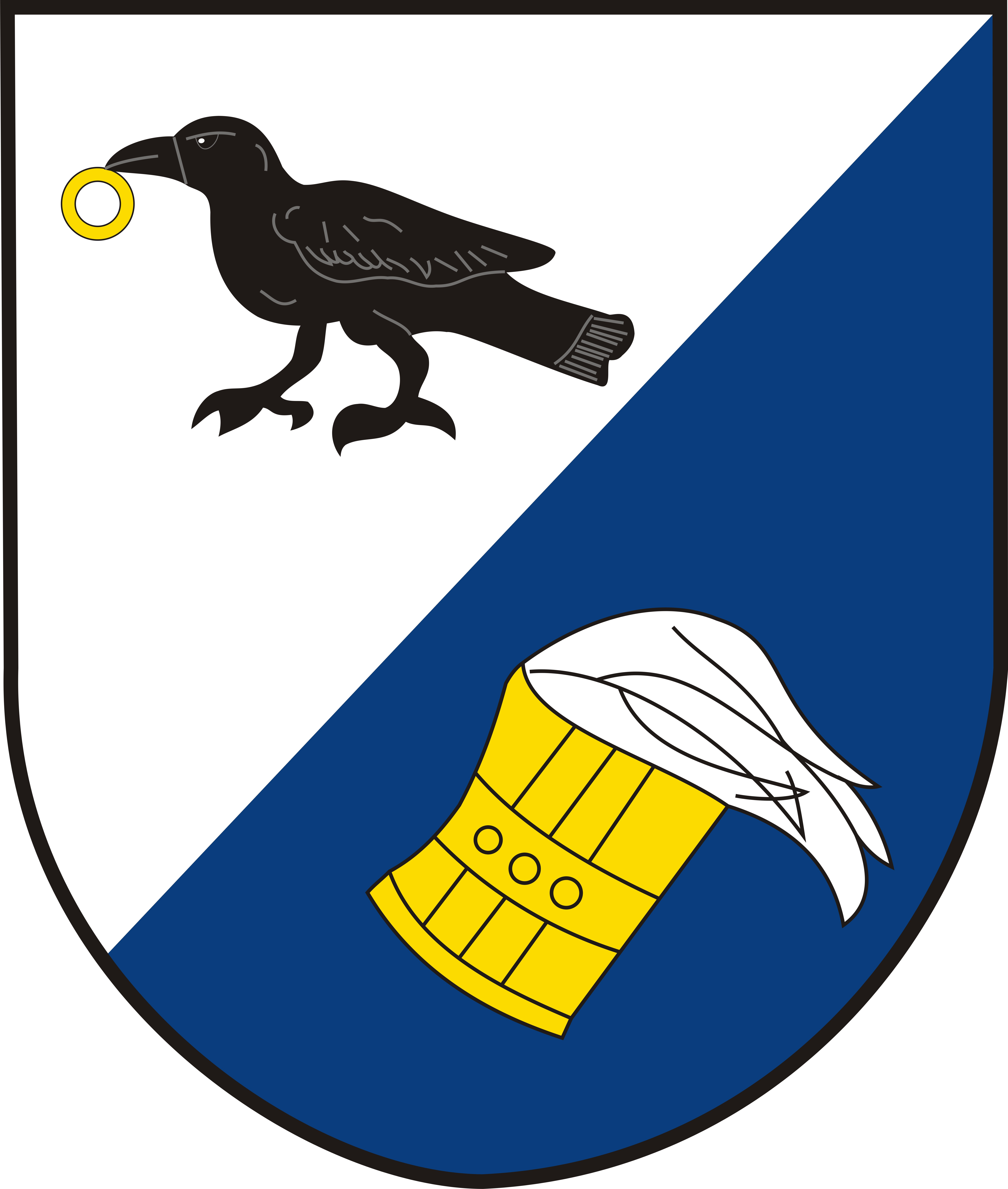
- Flag Coat of arms

- Location in the Czech Republic
- Coordinates: 49°25′23″N 16°9′30″E
- Country: Czech Republic
- Region: Vysočina
- District: Žďár nad Sázavou
- First mentioned: 1368

Area
  - Total: 3.96 km^{2} (1.53 sq mi)
- Elevation: 517 m (1,696 ft)

Population (2026-01-01)
  - Total: 169
  - Density: 42.7/km^{2} (111/sq mi)
- Time zone: UTC+1 (CET)
  - Summer (DST): UTC+2 (CEST)
- Postal code: 592 53
- Website: obec-radkov.cz

Radkov is a municipality and village in Žďár nad Sázavou District in the Vysočina Region of the Czech Republic. It has about 200 inhabitants.

Radkov lies approximately 23 kilometres (14 mi) south-east of Žďár nad Sázavou, 42 km (26 mi) east of Jihlava, and 146 km (91 mi) south-east of Prague.

== Demographics ==
Historical population
Year	Pop.	±%
1869	371	—
1880	350	−5.7%
1890	292	−16.6%
1900	294	+0.7%
1910	285	−3.1%
1921	319	+11.9%
1930	273	−14.4%
1950	207	−24.2%
1961	239	+15.5%
1970	231	−3.3%
1980	211	−8.7%
1991	205	−2.8%
2001	178	−13.2%
2011	172	−3.4%
2021	156	−9.3%
Source: Censuses
