= Daniela Radkova =

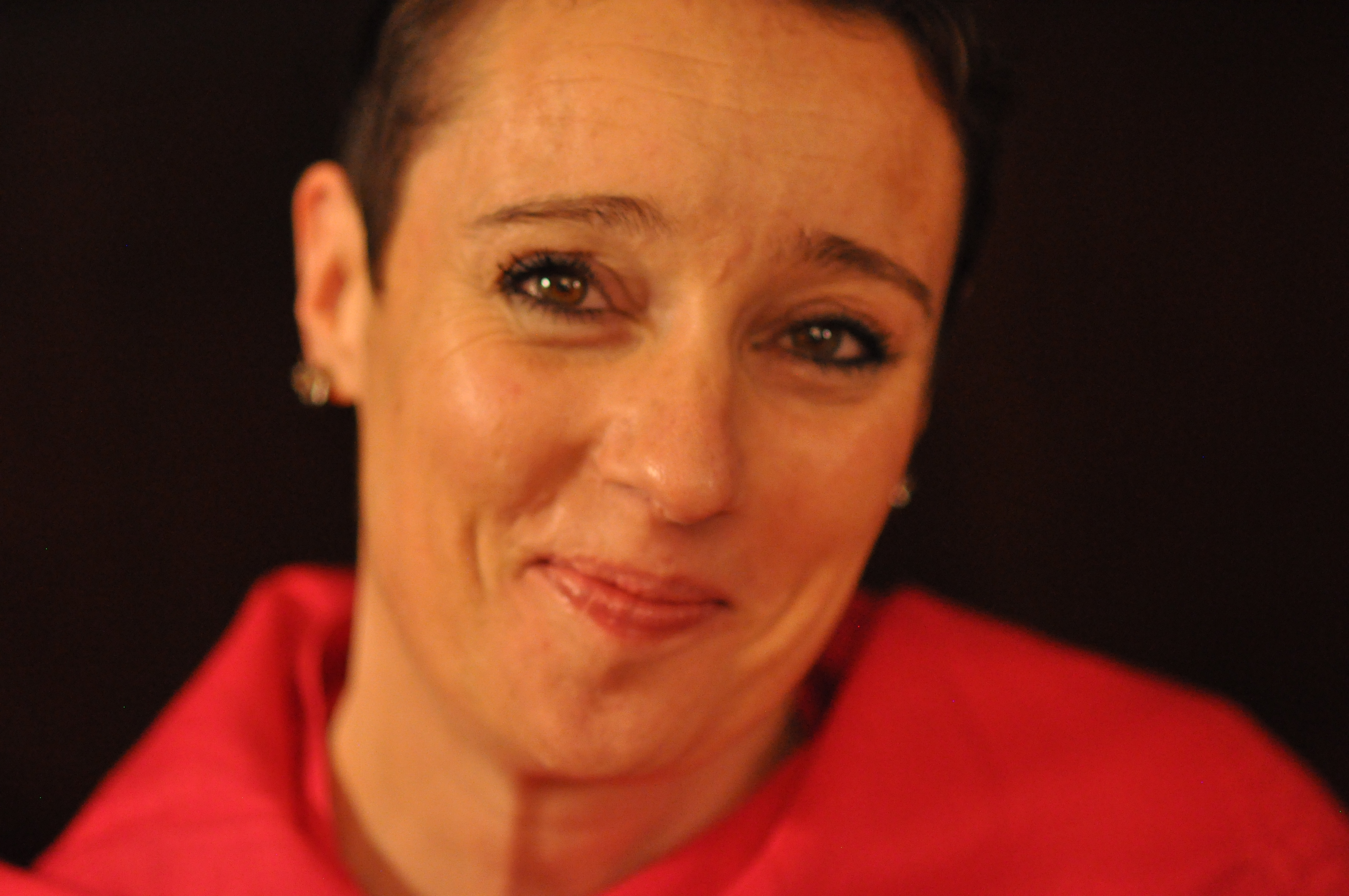
- Bulgarian singer
- Born: October 29, 1972 (age 52); Levski, Bulgaria
- Occupation: singer

Ms Daniela Radkova-Aleksandrova (Bulgarian: Даниела Радкова-Александрова) is a Bulgarian folk singer, performing folklore from the Balkans, who became world known as a soloist at the Filip Kutev Ensemble, and at the orchestra of Goran Bregovic. She is sister of the Bulgarian folk singer Ludmila Radkova.

Daniela Radkova was born in a family with strong musical traditions. Her mother – Liliana Zhivkova – is a librarian, and performer in amateur arts. Her father – Radko Yankov is known for his voice and dancing skills.

Daniela graduates the musical school in Kotel in 1990, and is accepted after a test exam at the Filip Kutev Ensemble, where she becomes a soloist.

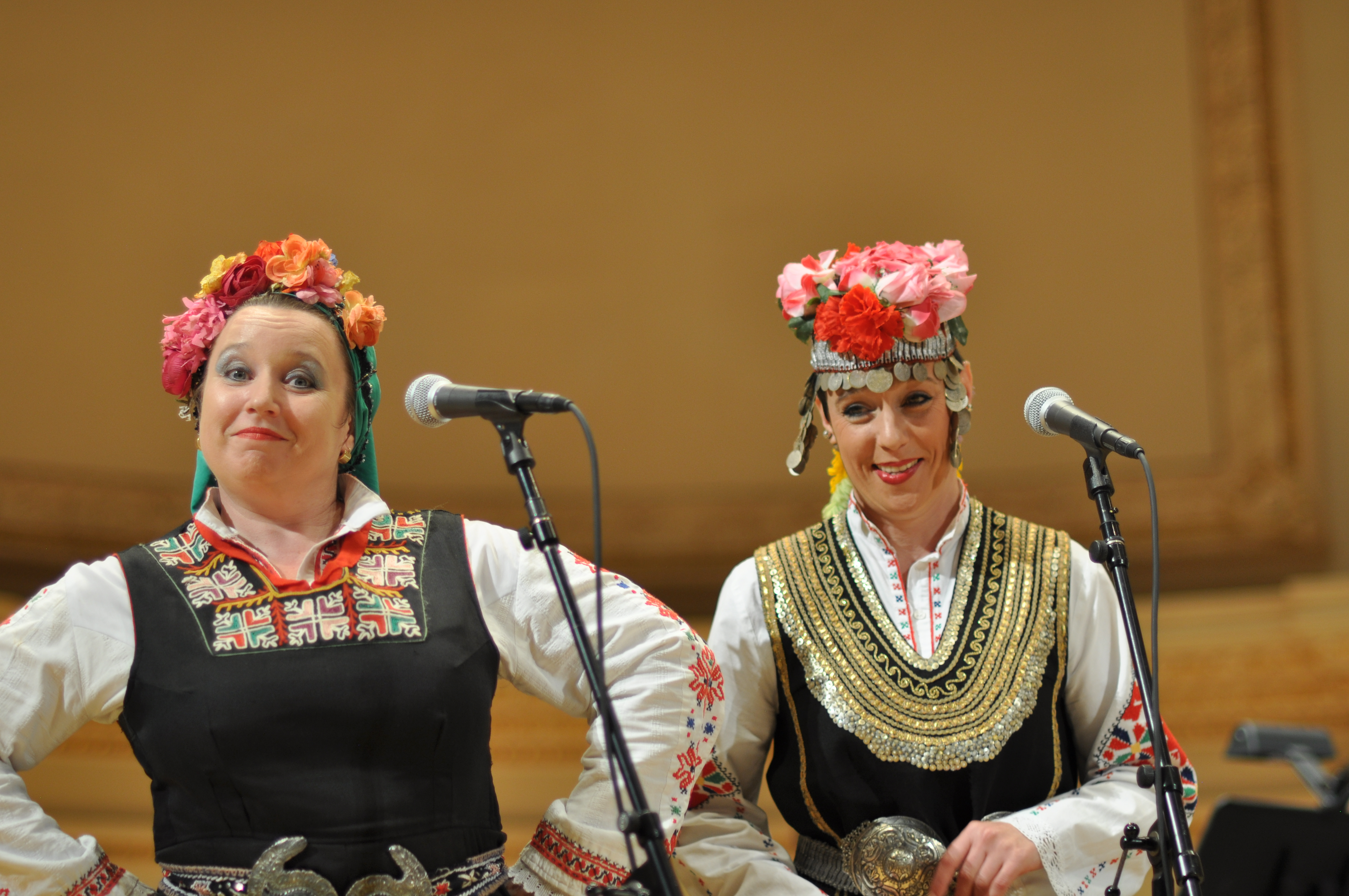
Ludmila Radkova (left) and Daniela Radkova (right) at stage, New York City, Carnegie Hall, October 19, 2011

Radkova-Aleksandrova met Goran Bregovic in 1995 while recording music from the movie Underground. Since then, she has been a standard among the performers in his Weddings and Funerals Orchestra.

She sings solo vocals for Filip Kutev Ensemble's and Goran Bregovic's albums. She has also played a role in the Norwegian movie, Music for Weddings and Funerals. In 2010 she was awarded with the Bulgarian Medal of Honor. Both Daniela and her sister, Ludmila Radkova, are considered by the Bulgarian mainstream and online media as representatives of the country on the world concert stages. Factor.bg includes them in a list of Bulgarian female artists, who "protect the spirit of the nation". Unlike her sister, Ludmila Radkova, who is a regular guest at Bulgarian TV, radio and newspaper interviews, Daniela keeps her life private and it is her sister, who provides all the information for the performers.

Bregovic has said that she has unique vocal characteristics, and brings specific feelings to his songs, which make her a favorite among worldwide audiences.

Daniela Radkova-Aleksandrova is married and has one child.

== Additional Information ==
Facebook page: https://www.facebook.com/RadkoviSisters/
