= Lazy Square =

Russian-born animator and director

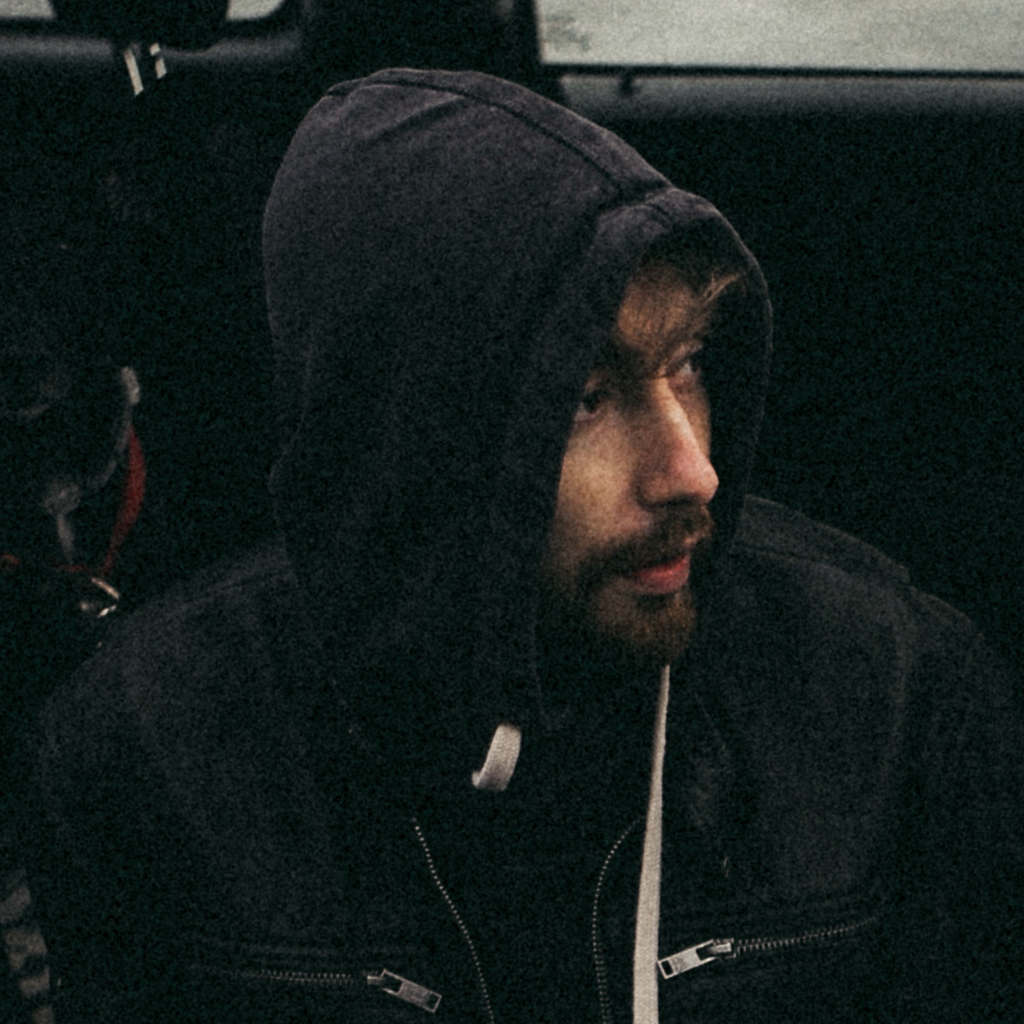
- Born: November 19, 1987 (age 38); Novosibirsk, Soviet Union
- Occupations: Animator, director, independent filmmaker
- Website: www.lazy-square.com

Lazy Square is the professional pseudonym of Alex (Aleksei) Semenov (born 19 November 1987), a Russian-born animator, director, and independent filmmaker known for independently produced animated short films distributed online. His work has been featured in international media and online publications.

== Early life and education ==
Alex (Aleksei) Semenov was born on 19 November 1987 in Novosibirsk, Soviet Union. He spent part of his childhood in Novosibirsk and moved to Moscow with his family at the age of 15.

His interest in animation began in early childhood, when he experimented with hand-drawn sequences and simple animation techniques.

He studied graphic design at the Moscow Art and Industry Institute, graduating in 2012.

== Career ==
In the early 2000s, Semenov became interested in Flash animation, which later influenced his visual style and production approach.

Semenov began producing independent animated works under the name Lazy Square in the mid-2010s. His projects became known for their distinctive visual style and use of dark humor.

He is known for working as a one-person production studio, handling all aspects of production, including writing, direction, animation, voice performance, and sound design.

His animated shorts have been distributed across platforms such as YouTube and social media, where they have accumulated millions of views.

In addition to original content, he has created commissioned animation and promotional material for international brands such as 20th Century Fox, Ubisoft, Xbox, and L'Oréal brands including Kiehl's and Matrix.

In 2022, Semenov left Russia and relocated to Turkey, where he lived for approximately three years. During this period, he continued producing independent animated shorts and collaborating with international clients.

While living in Istanbul, he created the short animation Teşekkürler İstanbul, dedicated to the city upon his departure. The video was widely shared online and covered in multiple publications.

After leaving Turkey, Semenov relocated to the United States, where he continues to live and work.

In 2024, during a surge of public interest in artificial intelligence, Semenov released the animated short The A.I., which explored society’s relationship with AI. The film received coverage in online publications.

In 2026, Lazy Square released the animated short Brainrot, a satirical science-fiction comedy narrated by actor Thomas Middleditch. The film explored themes of internet culture, doomscrolling, and declining attention spans. The short received coverage from multiple animation industry publications, including Animation World Network, Stash Magazine, and Skwigly Animation Magazine.

== Selected works ==
One of his widely shared works is a reinterpretation of the opening sequence of the animated television series The Simpsons, presented in a darker and more satirical tone. The short was released under the name Lenivko Kvadratjić.

Another notable work is the short animated film 30 Wasted Years, an autobiographical animation depicting Semenov's life over three decades. The film was featured in multiple online publications and circulated widely online.

Early in his animation career, Semenov also created a widely circulated and controversial animated short parodying a Nike-style advertisement, often referred to as Just Do It. The video sparked discussion online and was not affiliated with Nike.

== Style ==
Lazy Square's animation style is characterized by detailed character design, controlled line work, and a balance between stylization and anatomical precision. While the visuals often appear simplified at first glance, they incorporate carefully constructed forms, realistic proportions, and deliberate posing.

His work combines elements of minimal animation techniques with a focus on timing, composition, and expressive motion. The visual approach draws from both classic Flash-era animation and contemporary digital aesthetics, at times approaching anime-influenced proportions while remaining grounded in a restrained, graphic style.

Particular attention is given to background design, color composition, and environmental detail. Backgrounds are often densely constructed and include numerous visual easter eggs and cultural references.

Despite the stylization, his projects emphasize cinematic framing, lighting, and sound design, contributing to a sense of realism within a deliberately reduced visual language. His work often incorporates dark or absurdist humor.

== Recognition ==
Semenov's work has been presented at animation festivals and international showcases.

An earlier short film received first place in the "Best Film Under One Minute" category at the Azyl International Film Festival in Slovakia.

His short film The Hole was selected for the Against the Kremlin short film showcase at De Balie in Amsterdam.

== Other activities ==
Semenov is also a co-founder of the design brand Serious About, which produces accessories such as enamel pins and keychains.

== Personal life ==
Semenov lives in Miami Beach, Florida, United States.
