= Jutro (Sarajevo band) =

- Origin: Sarajevo, SR Bosnia and Herzegovina, SFR Yugoslavia
- Genres: Schlager pop, pop rock
- Years active: 1971–1973
- Label: Radio Kruševac
- Spinoffs: Bijelo Dugme
- Past members: Nuno Arnautalić; Goran Bregović; Željko Bebek; Zlatko Hodnik; Zoran Redžić; Gordan Matrak; Perica Stojanović; Šento Borovčanin; Vlado Pravdić; Ipe Ivandić; Ivica Vinković; Jadranko Stanković

Jutro (trans. "Morning") was a Sarajevo-based rock band most notable as the immediate predecessor to Bijelo Dugme. It existed from late 1971 until the very end of 1973 when it transformed into Bijelo Dugme, one of the most successful rock bands ever to come out of Yugoslavia.

== Career ==
Jutro was formed by twenty-eight-year-old rhythm guitarist Ismet "Nuno" Arnautalić (formerly of Indexi) who in autumn 1971 approached guitarist Goran Bregović with an offer of putting together a new band. Twenty-one-year-old Bregović—who had recently returned to Sarajevo after gigging across Southern Italy for a year as part of an act called Kodeksi that transformed into Mića, Goran i Zoran before folding—accepted. Both self-taught Sarajevo-based musicians, trying to earn a living on the fledgling Yugoslav pop-rock scene, Arnautalić and Bregović were ready to give being in a band another try following recent professional setbacks with their respective prior bands.

Having been a founding member of Indexi—spending most of the 1960s with the band, a period during which they released a number of singles, competed at countless schlager festivals around Yugoslavia, and went on a lucrative tour of the Soviet Union—Arnautalić never reclaimed his spot in the band after going away to serve his mandatory year-long Yugoslav People's Army (JNA) stint in 1969. He instead got married, had a child, secured a steady source of income by getting hired at Radio Sarajevo's Dance Orchestra (one of the state-owned broadcaster's official musical ensembles), and was now looking to get back on the commercial scene via starting another band. On the other hand, though significantly younger than Arnautalić, Bregović was no less ambitious and driven when it came to organizing and running a band, seeing Jutro as a fresh opportunity to implement the ideas he wasn't able to at Kodeksi. In the months following his return from Italy, he had rededicated himself to his neglected philosophy and sociology studies at the University of Sarajevo's Faculty of Philosophy, and also got accepted into the Yugoslav Communist League (SKJ), the only political organization in the country's one-party system.

=== 1972: Schlagers ===
By January 1972, along with a vision for a band that was still missing a singer, Bregović had managed to come up with a few original songs. Next, looking for a vocalist, he approached his old Kodeksi bandmate Željko Bebek—whom he hadn't spoken to in more than a year ever since their acrimonious split in Italy—by reportedly sending a brief unsigned telegram stating only a meeting time and location, in front of the Radio Sarajevo building at Danijela Ozme Street. Facing his old musical collaborator, Bregović presented the idea of a new band by saying: "Let bygones be bygones and let's do something new". Twenty-six-year-old Bebek—who had been preparing to leave town for his mandatory army stint—still decided to take the vague and unexpected offer and record a couple of early versions of "Patim, evo, deset dana", before going away, on 23 February 1972, to serve in Pirot, thus effectively leaving Bregović and Arnautalić without a singer again.

Around the same time, only four months into their collaboration, the duo started butting heads over Jutro's future musical direction: Arnautalić wanted them to go the route of competitive pop schlager festivals in order to get noticed, whereas Bregović thought live club shows were the way to go about building an audience. After much wrangling, they agreed on Travnik-born twenty-one-year-old Zlatko Hodnik (1950-2016) as the new temporary singer. Hodnik—the winner of the Zlatni aplauz festival for singing hopefuls—was a typical schlager festival singer, all of which Bregović detested, but Arnautalić prevailed in this instance. In turn, Bregović got to pick the rhythm section, bringing in his old buddy from Kodeksi and Italian days Zoran Redžić on bass as well as drummer Gordan Matrak (a fellow student at Sarajevo University's Faculty of Philosophy, which Bregović attended at the time).

Jutro's first live performance took place in Skenderija Hall on 15 April 1972 as part of the Vaš šlager sezone festival, a schlager competition established and run by Nuno Arnautalić's older brother Esad. With Hodnik as the vocalist, Bregović on guitar, Arnautalić on rhythm guitar, Redžić on bass, and Matrak on drums, they performed the song "Ostajem tebi" that would later be included on the band's Radio Kruševac-released single "Ostajem tebi" / "Sad te vidim". The main prize that day was won by Pro Arte performing a Đorđe Novković-written song "Nemoj draga plakati".

Another notable Jutro live performance took place in late October 1972, opening for Indexi in front of a crowd of 12,000 spectators at Skenderija.

In November 1972, Bebek got an army leave allowing him to temporarily return home to Sarajevo, a period during which he recorded tracks "Kad bi' bio bijelo dugme", "Na vrh brda vrba mrda", "Hop cup", and "U subotu, mala" before going back to serve.

In the meantime, drummer Gordan Matrak had left the band. Perica Stojanović became the new drummer, but left quickly, at which point Vladimir "Šento" Borovčanin came over from Pro Arte, bringing the desired stability.

=== 1973: Bregović takes over ===
By February 1973, the band was eagerly awaiting Bebek's return from the army. However, nothing could repair the deteriorating Arnautalić-Bregović relationship as their disagreements and silent feuding came to a head. Bregović began pushing harder for a musical shift within the band—wanting them to start playing tight hard rock with a particularly strong Balkan folk component, none of which sat well with Arnautalić who wanted to keep the status quo and continue playing schlagers. Bregović won this standoff, mostly because the rest of the band (Zoran and Šento) supported his vision. Even Bebek chimed in from the army in support of Bregović's direction as Arnautalić was increasingly being overruled and even pushed towards leaving.

In March 1973, Radio Kruševac released Jutro's second 7-inch single "U subotu, mala" / "Kad bi' bio bijelo dugme" (two of the songs Bebek recorded during one of his army leaves). The order of the songs on the single served to drive yet another wedge between Bregović and Arnautalić because Arnautalić, who kept contact with the label on band's behalf, unilaterally submitted his song "U subotu, mala" as the A-side thus relegating Bregović's "Kad bi' bio bijelo dugme" to the B-side. Arnautalić left the band right after the single release. Around the same time Bebek returned from the army for good, however, not being quite convinced about the band's commercial potential, he also got a regular job—finding employment as a clerk at the municipal social services.

Soon after Arnautalić's withdrawal, Bregović, who by now became the group's undisputed leader and driving force, set about molding it to his own preferences, which almost felt like starting over from scratch. One of his first decisions was adding a keyboardist—a spot eventually filled by the locally established musician Vlado Pravdić who had already been contributing to Jutro since the group's early days and was on friendly terms with its members. Furthermore, he owned a Hammond organ, which was an added plus.

Bregović also wanted to come up with a batch of new material, pushing the other members hard towards that end. This created resistance, especially from Šento Borovčanin who had already experienced a certain measure of fame at Pro arte, and thus did not appreciate being bossed around by Bregović. Borovčanin's enthusiasm further dropped when the negotiations with Jugoton regarding the release of a single fell through, and he also started swaying Zoran Redžić over to his side. The situation festered until the beginning of the summer when Bregović kicked them both out of the band following a vicious shouting match.

In order to achieve his goal of coming up with more material, Bregović met up with Pravdić (still not officially a Jutro member) in Gradac during the summer of 1973. Bregović vacationed there in his mother's house, while Pravdić played summer gigs with Indexi in nearby Baška Voda. They jammed a lot together in this period, creating templates for many of the future songs (most of which eventually ended up on Bijelo dugme albums).

So, after a productive working vacation, Bregović was back in Sarajevo faced with a problem of finding a new rhythm section. Borovčanin's replacement on drums became seventeen-year-old Ipe Ivandić whom Bregović met at Skenderija Hall while filling the bass player spot proved to be more difficult. Bregović heavily courted Ivica Vinković of Ambasadori who stayed behind in Sarajevo because of university obligations while his band was touring Soviet Union. For a while Vinković seemed eager to join Jutro, too, however, once his Ambasadori bandmates returned from the tour with pockets full of cash, he wanted no part of Jutro anymore, and immediately ended his episode with Bregović. Still, his brief stint with the band was noted on tracks "Top" and "Ove ću noći naći blues", which would also later become a part of Bijelo Dugme repertoire. Jadranko Stanković became the new bassist.

As 1973 was nearing to a close, Jutro was constantly gigging, but the income was low. Furthermore, with no album in sight, their prospects for a sudden injection of cash were bleak.

As soon as Nikola Borota Radovan finished his recording session with Hamdija Čustović, we rushed in with our equipment in order to use the remaining hour to record "Top" and "Ove ću noći naći blues". We had absolutely no permission to be there and were particularly scared of Radio Sarajevo's producer-in-chief Milan Stupar who had a habit of entering the studios unannounced. We recorded everything in such a rush before getting our stuff out of there even quicker and disappearing down the building corridors.

— Goran Bregović on the circumstances around Jutro's late 1973 recording of the "Top" and "Ove ću noći naći blues" tracks, which would on 29 March 1974 be released as Bijelo Dugme's debut seven-inch single.

Following Arnautalić's departure from the band, Jutro experienced a continual problem with access to recording studios in Sarajevo, which was Aranutalić's revenge to Bregović for phasing him out of the band. Arnautalić claimed ownership of the name "Jutro" and used the influence his older brother Esad Arnautalić wielded around Radio Sarajevo in order to place a shadow ban on Jutro recording in their studios.

Trying to get around the unfortunate situation, the band members enlisted their own personal connections as Vlado Pravdić's mother had a friend employed at Radio Sarajevo whom they called aunt Maca. However, they didn't get anywhere until Bregović met and somewhat befriended composer Nikola Borota Radovan who happened to be contracted by Radio-Television Sarajevo and Jugoton as a music producer and TV executive in charge of youth programming. The two cut a deal whereby Bregović would help out on tracks "Hop cup" (G. Bregović) and "Kameni cvijet" (N. Borota), which Borota had been producing for singer Hamdija Čustović's upcoming single, in return for some studio time at the end of Ćustović's sessions. The session was officially engineered by Antun "Tuna" Marković, one of the oldest and most experienced sound engineers at the time. However, for the occasion, Borota briefly replaced him on the mixing console while he was having a nap in the corner of the control console. The two tracks Jutro recorded that day—"Top" and "Ove ću noći naći blues"—would later on, during spring 1974, be released as a seven-inch single by Jugoton under the (newly formed) Bijelo Dugme banner, launching the band to nation-wide fame. The material would initially be offered to local Sarajevo-based label Diskoton, however, once its top executive Slobodan Vujović rejected it, Jugoton stepped in via, in part, Borota's connections and local Jugoton representative Hamdija Salković.

Still, for the time being in late 1973, Bregović had to concede Arnautalić and his brother were powerful and influential figures on the Sarajevo music scene and that guerilla recording wasn't going to get Jutro anywhere. Since the band was about to enter their third year of existence with very little to show for their musical engagement, something had to be done about the studio access.

As they were generally known by their song "Kad bi bilo bijelo dugme" and since there was also another band named Jutro operating in Ljubljana, Bregović & co. decided to switch their name to Bijelo Dugme. The change officially took effect on the night between December 31, 1973 and January 1, 1974 when they played Skenderija Hall as Bijelo dugme for the very first time. By some sources Damjan Babic, a composer and professor asked Bregovic if “kad bi’ bio bijelo dugme” song was his and why not to name the band “Bijelo dugme” (White button). Bregovic didn't have any other alternative name.

The name change took care of the studio access issue as Arnautalić finally put aside his grievances.

== Jutro discography ==
=== Singles ===
- "Ostajem tebi" / "Sad te vidim" (Radio Kruševac, 1972)
- "U subotu mala" / "Kad bih bio bijelo dugme" (Radio Kruševac, 1973)
