= Lyudmila Radkova =

Bulgarian folk singer

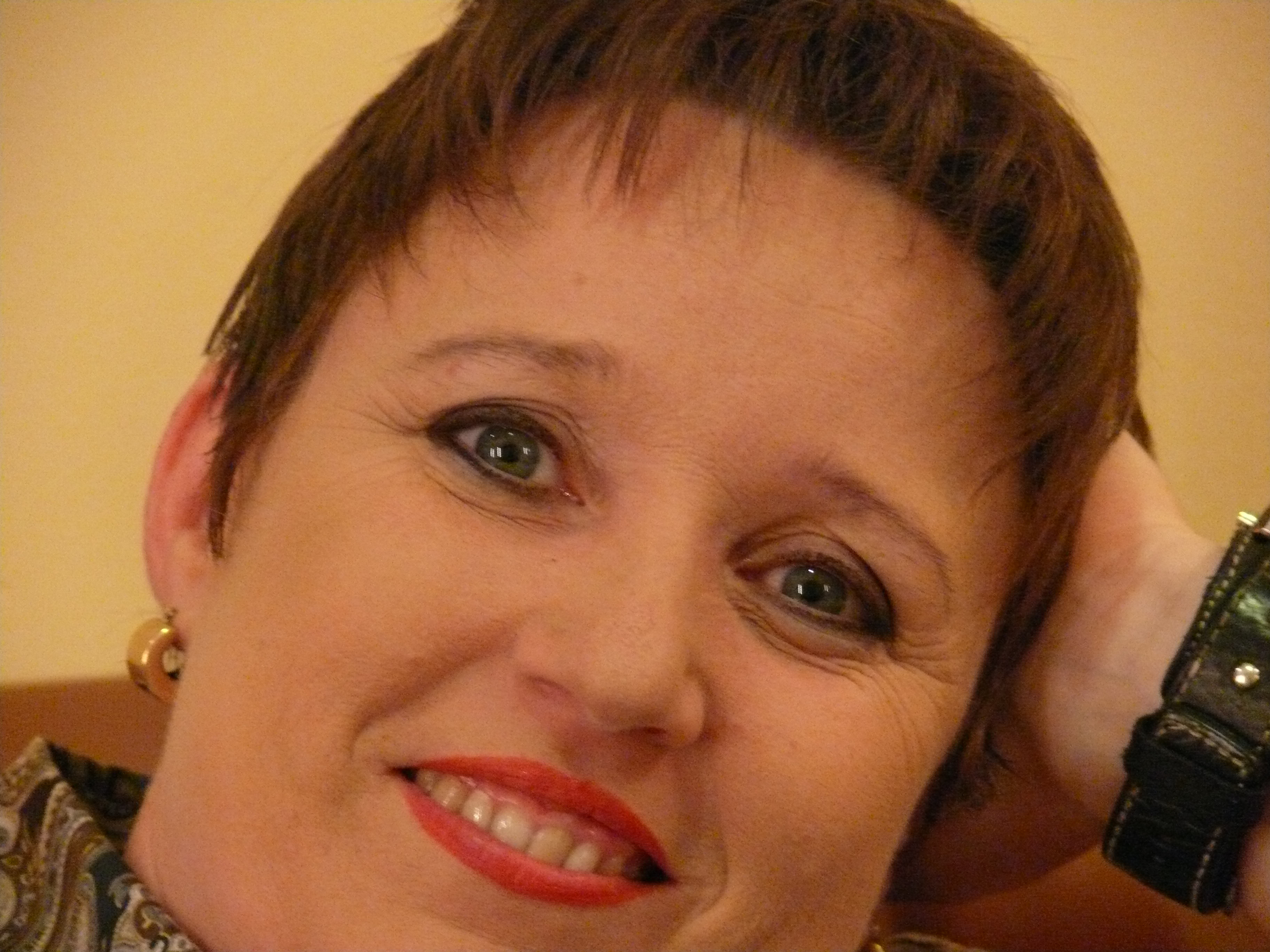
- Bulgarian singer
- Born: August 23, 1968 (age 57); Levski, Bulgaria
- Occupation: singer

Lyudmila Radkova-Traykova (Bulgarian: Людмила Радкова) is a Bulgarian folk singer, performing folklore from the Balkans, who became world known as a soloist at the Filip Kutev Ensemble, and at the orchestra of Goran Bregovic. She is sister of the Bulgarian folk singer Daniela Radkova.

== Biography ==
Lyudmila Radkova was born in a family with strong musical traditions. Her mother – Liliana Zhivkova – is a librarian, and performer in amateur arts. Her father – Radko Yankov is known for his voice and dancing skills.

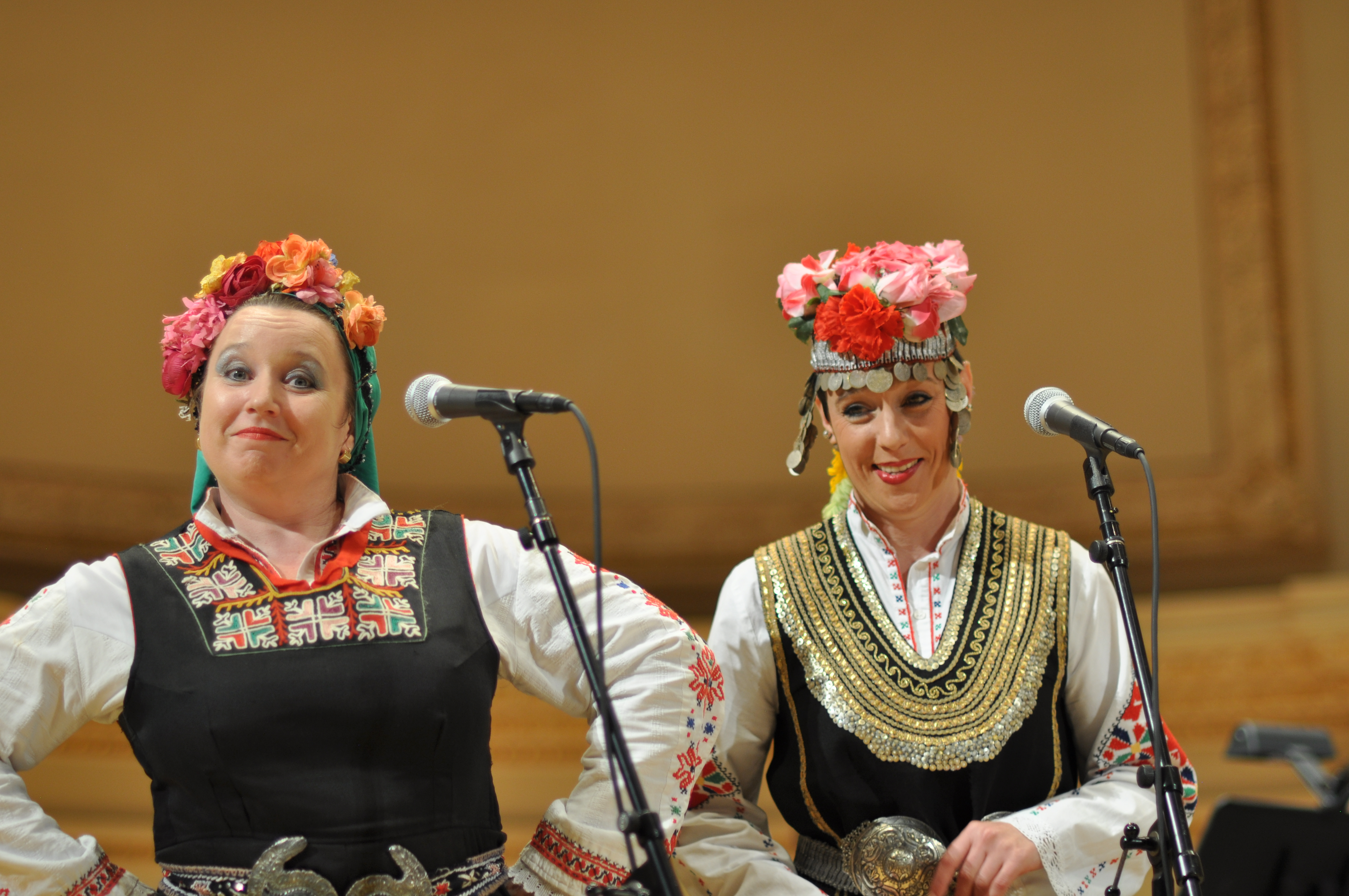
Ludmila Radkova and Daniela Radkova at stage, New York City, Carnegie Hall, October 19, 2011

Ludmila Radkova graduated the musical school in Kotel, Bulgaria, in 1987, and after exams is accepted to sing at the Filip Kutev Ensemble.

In 1995 she meets with Goran for the recording of the music in the movie Underground and since then she is always among the performers in his orchestra.

She has published a tape in Bulgaria in 1992, has solo parties in the Filip Kutev Ensemble's and Goran Bregovic's albums. She has participated in the Norwegian movie, Music for Weddings and Funerals. In 2010 she was awarded with the Bulgarian Medal of Honor. Both Ludmila and her sister, Daniela Radkova, are considered by the Bulgarian mainstream and online media as representatives of the country on the world concert stages. Factor.bg includes them in a list of Bulgarian female artists, who "protect the spirit of the nation". Ludmila Radkova is a regular guest at Bulgarian TV, radio and newspaper interviews.

Ludmila Radkova is married and has one child.

== Additional Information ==
Facebook page: https://www.facebook.com/RadkoviSisters/
