= Underground (soundtrack) =

Soundtrack album by Goran Bregović
- Released: May 9, 2000 (U.S.)
- Recorded: 1995
- Genre: Čoček
- Label: PolyGram
- Producer: Goran Bregović

Professional ratings
Review scores
Source	Rating
Allmusic	3/5 stars

Underground is an album by Goran Bregović. Some of the songs on the album are from the film with the same title by Emir Kusturica, while others are inspired by the film. Several songs from this album, such as "Mesečina" and "Kalašnjikov", became instant-classic tavern and brass-band hits. The Boban Marković Orchestra is heavily featured in the soundtrack.

Among other pieces, "Mesečina" was performed by Keba, Trans-Siberian March Band and The Lemon Bucket Orkestra. Sezen Aksu covered "Kalašnjikov", "Ausência", "Wedding-Čoček" and "Mesečina" in Turkish language on her 1997 Bregović-produced album Düğün ve Cenaze, titled "Kalaşnikof", "O Sensin", "Düğün" and "Ayışığı", respectively.

== Track listing ==
1. Kalašnjikov (cf. Kalashnikov)
2. Ausência (feat. Cesária Évora)
3. Mesečina / Moonlight
4. Ya Ya (Ringe Ringe Raja)
5. Cajesukarije-Čoček
6. Wedding‐Čoček
7. War
8. Underground‐Čoček
9. Underground Tango
10. The Belly Button of the World
11. Sheva

== See also ==
- Čoček
- Balkan Brass Band

== Certifications ==
Region	Certification	Certified units/sales
Greece (IFPI Greece)	Gold	37,000
