= Męskie Granie =

Annual concert tour in Poland

- Concert by various artists
- Location: Poland
- Start date: 2010

Męskie Granie (English: Masculine Playing) is a concert tour, initiated by Żywiec Brewery. It is organized each year in the summer in major Polish cities, with the addition of the town Żywiec. The first edition was held in 2010.

The aim of the tour is to present the creative side of Polish music scene and to encourage the audience to listen to musical experiments, such as jazz musicians playing with rappers. Major Polish artists participate in the tour.

== Editions ==
=== Męskie Granie 2010 ===
Six concerts were organized: in Gdańsk (17 July 2010), Katowice (24 July 2010), Poznań (31 July 2010), Kraków (7 August 2010), Wrocław (14 August 2010) and Warsaw (21 August 2010). Additionally, a special concert in the town Żywiec was organized on 24 September 2010, it was attended by 10,000 people. The concerts were attended by 30,000 people. Wojciech Waglewski was the art director of the tour.

The artist line-up included: Abradab, Smolik, Bajzel, DJ Eprom, Homosapiens, Kim Nowak, Leszek Możdżer, Maciej Maleńczuk, Michał Jacaszek, Mitch & Mitch, Nergal, Oxy.gen, Pogodno, Tin Pan Alley, Tomasz Stańko, Voo Voo and Wojciech Waglewski. In each of the cities, there were exhibitions of photographs by Tomasz Sikora, animations by Mariusz Wilczyński and scenography by Jarosław Koziara.

The tour was promoted by a single "Wszyscy muzycy to wojownicy" ("All musicians are warriors"), performed by Wojciech Waglewski, Maciej Maleńczuk and Abradab. The lyrics and music were written by Wojciech Waglewski. On 22 November 2010, a double album Męskie Granie was released. The record, which contained songs by artists participating in the tour, was certified Platinum in Poland and won a Fryderyk award in the category Album of the Year - Alternative. On 1 January 2011, in Polskie Radio's studio a special Męskie Granie concert was held and the artists receive the platinum certification.

=== Męskie Granie 2011 ===
In 2011, seven concerts were held, gathering and audience of 35,000. Wojciech Waglewski was the art director of the tour for the second time. Scenography was designed by Jarosław Koziara. Several artistic projects were also organized.

The tour was promoted by a single "Kobiety nam wybaczą" ("Women Will Forgive Us"), recorded by Wojciech Waglewski, Lech Janerka, Spięty, Fisz and Leszek Możdżer, with music written by Wojciech Waglewski and lyrics by Wojciech Waglewski, Lech Janerka, Spięty and Fisz.

On 24 October 2011, a triple album Męskie Granie 2011 was released. It contained a DVD with a 20-minute documentary "Making of Męskie Granie 2011". The album was certified platinum in Poland.

==== Concerts ====
Żywiec, 16 July 2011

DJ Eprom and Emade, L.U.C, Spięty, Fisz Emade Tworzywo and Adam Pierończyk with DJ Eprom, Raz Dwa Trzy, Lech Janerka and Krzysztof Popek, Wojciech Waglewski and Mariusz Wilczyński, Voo Voo

Warsaw, 23 July 2011

DJ Eprom and Emade, Cool Kids of Death, Janusz Staszewski, Lao Che, Leszek Możdżer, Fisz Emade Tworzywo and Adam Pierończyk with DJ Eprom, Lech Janerka and Krzysztof Popek, Wojciech Waglewski and Mariusz Wilczyński, Voo Voo

The first concert transmitted online, watched by 120,00 people.

Kraków, 30 July 2011

DJ Eprom and Emade, Kombajn do Zbierania Kur po Wioskach, Kroke and Marek Bałata, Spięty, Leszek Możdżer, Fisz Emade Tworzywo and Adam Pierończyk with DJ Eprom, Lech Janerka and Krzysztof Popek, Voo Voo, T.Love

Lublin, 6 August 2011

DJ Eprom and Emade, Muchy, Deriglasoff, Pink Freud, Abradab and Piotr "Gutek" Gutkowski, Spięty, Lech Janerka and Krzysztof Popek, Fisz Emade Tworzywo and Adam Pierończyk with DJ Eprom, Voo Voo, T.Love

Gdańsk, 13 August 2011

DJ Eprom and Emade, Muzyka Końca Lata, Kumka Olik, Pink Freud, Lao Che, Lech Janerka and Krzysztof Popek, Fisz Emade Tworzywo and Adam Pierończyk with DJ Eprom, Voo Voo, T.Love

Wrocław, 20 August 2011

DJ Eprom and Emade, Jazzpospolita, Bajzel, Pink Freud, Lao Che, Fisz Emade Tworzywo and Adam Pierończyk with DJ Eprom, Myslovitz, Lech Janerka and Krzysztof Popek, Wojciech Waglewski and Mariusz Wilczyński, Voo Voo

Poznań, 27 August 2011

DJ Eprom and Emade, Snowman, Transistors, Muniek with guest Jan Nowicki, Lao Che, Leszek Możdżer, Fisz Emade Tworzywo and Adam Pierończyk with DJ Eprom, Lech Janerka and Krzysztof Popek, Wojciech Waglewski and Mariusz Wilczyński, Voo Voo and Titus

=== Męskie Granie 2012 ===
In 2012, the art director of Męskie Granie was Kasia Nosowska. Six concerts were held. The scenography was created by Małgorzata Szabłowska, with visual arts by Paweł "Spider" Pająk.

The tour was promoted by a single "Ognia!", recorded by Kasia Nosowska and Marek Dyjak, with lyrics by Kasia Nosowska and music by Marcin Macuk.

==== Concerts ====
Warsaw, 14 July 2012

Crab Invasion, June, BaBu Król, Kamp!, Muzykoterapia, Marek Dyjak, Pablopavo i Ludziki with brass instruments and Marika, Tomasz Stańko and Leszek Możdżer, Kasia Nosowska (with guest appearances by Wojciech Waglewski and Iza Kowalewska, Leszek Możdżer and Tomasz Stańko), Grabek

Kraków, 21 July 2012

Afro Kolektyw, Mitch & Mitch, Kari Amirian, Łąki Łan, Julia Marcell, Marek Dyjak, O.S.T.R. Tabasko and Noise Trio, KNŻ, Czesław Śpiewa (with a guest appearance by Kasia Nosowska), Kasia Nosowska (with a guest appearance by Kazik Staszewski, Grabek

Gdańsk, 28 July 2012

Gypsy Pill, Hanimal, Łona and Webber & The Pimps, UL/KR, Łąki Łan, Muzykoterapia, Raz Dwa Trzy and Spitfire, Dezerter (with guest Kasia Nosowska), Kury, Hey (with guests Iza Kowalewska and Tymon Tymański), Grabek

Poznań, 4 August 2012

Sorry Boys, Julia Marcell, O.S.T.R. Tabasko, Aleksandra Kurzak accompanied by Orkiestra Feel Harmony, Kamp!, Mitch & Mitch, KNŻ, Acid Drinkers (with guest appearance by Kasia Nosowska), Kasia Nosowska (with guests Julia Marcell and Kazik Staszewski), Grabek

Wrocław, 11 August 2012

Drekoty, Paula & Karol, Tides From Nebula, Pogodno, UL/KR (with guest Kasia Nosowska), Natu Kozmic Blues, Raz Dwa Trzy and Spitfire, O.S.T.R. Tabasko, Hey (with guest Lech Janerka), Grabek

Żywiec, 1 September 2012

Bueno Bros, Jazzpospolita, Acid Drinkers (with guest appearance by Kasia Nosowska), O.S.T.R. Tabasko, Marek Dyjak, Brodka, Czesław Śpiewa, Hey (with guests Brodka, O.S.T.R. and Czesław Śpiewa)

=== Męskie Granie 2013 ===
In 2013, the art directors of Męskie Granie are singer Kasia Nosowska and rapper O.S.T.R. Together, they recorded a single "Jutro jest dziś" ("Tomorrow is today"), which promotes the tour.

In the Art Zone, audience can watch projects by Martyna Czerwińska, Marek Mielnicki, Paweł "Spider" Pająk, Magdalena Wosińska.

==== Concerts ====
Kraków, 13 July 2013

O.S.T.R. + Michał Urbaniak, Natu Kozmic Blues + Kasia Nosowska, 2Cresky Feat. Lach, Hey, Warsaw Village Band, Kim Nowak, Lao Che, Maja Olenderek Ensemble, Marek Dyjak, Pink Freud, Small Synth Orchestra

Chorzów, 20 July 2013

Leszek Możdżer + O.S.T.R., Stanisław Soyka + Nosowska, 2Cresky Feat. Lach, Ballady i Romanse, Fisz Emade Tworzywo, Hey, Grażyna Łobaszewska, Maria Peszek, Très.b, Krzysztof Zalewski, Small Synth Orchestra

Wrocław, 27 July 2013

BRODKA + Nosowska, O.S.T.R. + Michał Urbaniak, 2Cresky Feat. Lach, Ballady i Romanse, Hey, HIFI BANDA, Maria Peszek, Patti Yang Group, Pink Freud, Soniamiki, Small Synth Orchestra

Gdańsk, 3 August 2013

BRODKA + Nosowska, O.S.T.R. + Michał Urbaniak, 2Cresky Feat. Lach, Domowe Melodie, Hey, Łagodna Pianka, Mela Koteluk, Muchy, Őszibarack, Patti Yang Group, Très.b, Small Synth Orchestra

Poznań, 10 August 2013

BRODKA + Nosowska, O.S.T.R. + Michał Urbaniak, Hey, Warsaw Village Band, Kim Nowak, Lao Che, Pink Freud, Skalpel, UL/KR, Small Synth Orchestra

Warsaw, 17 August 2013

Leszek Możdżer + O.S.T.R., Stanisław Soyka + Nosowska, Hey, L.Stadt, Maria Peszek, Marek Dyjak, Patti Yang Group, Skalpel, Stanisława Celińska, Bartek Wąsik, Royal String Quartet, Très.b, Michał Urbaniak, Small Synth Orchestra

Żywiec, 31 August 2013

Zorak + O.S.T.R., O.S.T.R. + Michał Urbaniak, Nosowska, Hey, Kaliber 44, Mela Koteluk, Modulators, Myslovitz, Small Synth Orchestra
