= Na wylot =

Studio album by Fisz
- Released: 2001
- Genre: Hip-hop
- Length: 50:14
- Label: Asfalt Records
- Producer: DJ M.A.D. (Emade)

Fisz chronology
Polepione dźwięki (2000)	Na wylot (2001)	F3 (2002)

Na wylot is the second solo album by Polish rapper and alternative artist Fisz. In 2001 it was nominated to Hip-hop Album of The Year at Fryderyk Awards.

== Track listing ==
1. "Znużony" - 1:58
2. "30 cm" (feat. Novika) - 5:04
3. "S.O.S." (feat. Novika) - 5:25
4. "Rozmyty" - 5:04
5. "23:32" - 1:21
6. "Za wysoko?" - 4:52
7. "Tajemnica" (feat. Novika)- 5:20
8. "Zaraz wracam" - 6:19
9. "1985" - 1:13
10. "Deszcz" - 4:12
11. "Dworzec" - 3:52
12. "Na wylot" - 5:38

== Singles ==
1. "Tajemnica"
2. "30 cm"
