= Sobie i Wam =

2019 song by Męskie Granie Orkiestra

Single by Męskie Granie Orkiestra 2019 / Kasia Nosowska, Igo, Ørganek and Krzysztof Zalewski

from the album Męskie Granie 2019
- Released: 30 May 2019
- Recorded: 2019
- Genre: Pop rock
- Length: 3:23
- Label: Agencja LIVE, Kayax Production & Publishing
- Songwriters: Marcin Macuk (lyrics, music); Kasia Nosowska (music)

Męskie Granie singles chronology
"Początek" (2018)	"Sobie i Wam" (2019)	"Świt" (2020)

Music video
- "Sobie i Wam" on YouTube

"Sobie i Wam" (Polish: [ˈsɔ.bjɛ ˈi ˈvam]; lit. 'to ourselves and to you') is a Polish-language pop rock song recorded by Kasia Nosowska, Igor Walaszek (aka Igo), Ørganek and Krzysztof Zalewski for 2019 Męskie Granie concert tour. Song was composed by Marcin Macuk and Kasia Nosowska. It was released on 30 May 2019.

It reached number one in Poland and was awarded the platinum record certification by Polish Society of the Phonographic Industry in 2020.

== Chart performance ==
=== Weekly and daily charts ===
Chart (2019)	Peak position
Poland (AirPlay – Top)	2
Poland (AirPlay – Nowości)	3
Poland (LP3)	1
Poland (Poplista)	1
Poland (Radio Zet chart)	17
Poland (SLiP)	1
Poland (Radio Poznań chart)	1
Poland (Polskie Radio Koszalin Złota Trzydziestka)	1
Poland (Radio Łódź chart)	2
Poland (Radio PiK chart)	4

== Personnel ==
- vocals: Katarzyna Nosowska, Tomasz Organek, Krzysztof Zalewski, Igor Walaszek
- programming, guitar, bass guitar: Marcin Macuk
- keyboard: Michał "Fox" Król
- percussion: Michał "Malina" Maliński
- recording and mix: Arkadiusz Kopera (Black Kiss Records)
- mastering: Arkadiusz Kopera (Black Kiss Records)
- production: Marcin Macuk with help of Arkadiusz Kopera (Black Kiss Records)
- music video direction: Allan Willmann
