= Kari Amirian =

Polish singer

KARI
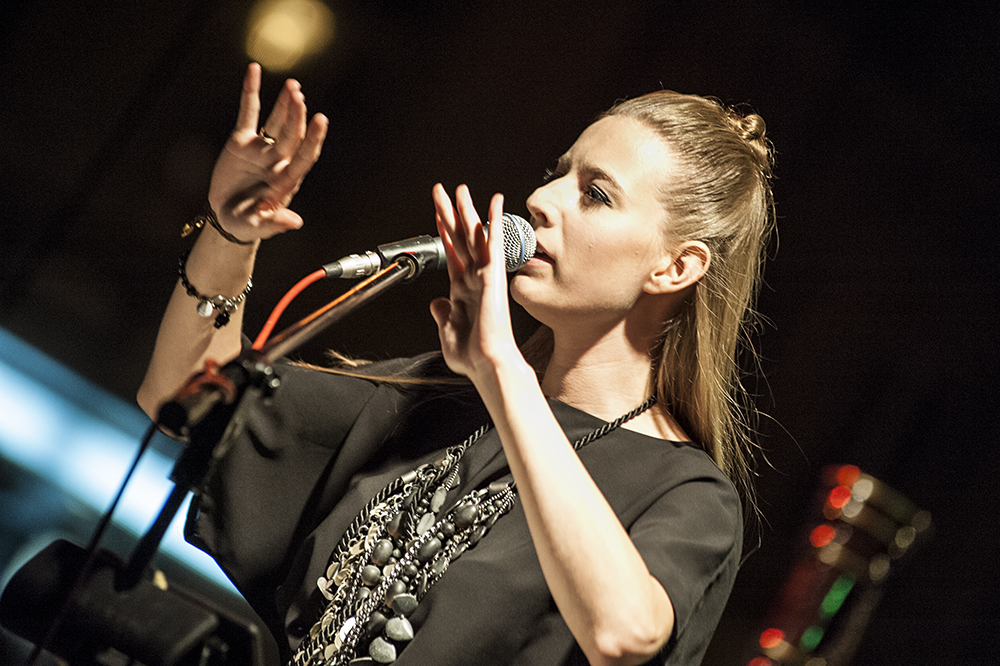
- Kari performing in Warsaw, August 2012.
- Born: Karolina Bis; Świnoujście, Poland
- Education: Fryderyk Chopin University of Music
- Occupation: Singer
- Musical career
- Genres: pop, alternative pop
- Label: Nextpop

Karolina Amirian (born in Świnoujście) is a Polish pop and alternative singer and music producer. In 2013, she was nominated for the Polish music award Fryderyk in the category Debut of the Year.

== Career ==
Kari moved to Warsaw at the age of 13 to study in a music school. She graduated from Fryderyk Chopin University of Music and Postgraduate Jazz Studium in Warsaw.

Her first studio album Daddy Says I'm Special was released in December 2011 as Kari Amirian through Nextpop and Polish music journalists called it one of the most interesting recent debuts. She was compared to Scandinavian artists such as Lykke Li, Stina Nordenstam, Björk, Junip and Mum.

In 2012, she was invited by Kasia Nosowska to participate in the Męskie Granie concert tour, as well as performed at Open'er Festival and Malta Festival Poznań, among others. In 2013, Kari was nominated to prestigious Polish music award Fryderyk in the category Debut of the Year.

In December 2012 she came to England where she started collaboration with Jon Headley (music producer and leader of the band called Modo Stare), John Pullan, Callum Harvie & Chris Headley and produced her second studio album, Wounds and Bruises, was released on 3 December 2013. The album was produced by Kari and Jon Headley, was promoted by the single "Hurry Up".

== Personal life ==
In December 2013 she moved to Leeds, UK.

== Discography ==
=== Studio albums ===
| Title | Album details |
|---|---|
| Daddy Says I'm Special | Released: 5 December 2011; Label: Nextpop |
| Wounds and Bruises | Released: 3 December 2013; Label: Nextpop |
| I Am Fine | Released: 9 June 2017; Label: Nextpop |

=== Charted songs ===
| Title | Year | Peak chart positions | Album |
| Title | Year | LP3 | Album |
|---|---|---|---|
| "The Winter is Back" | 2012 | 26 | Daddy Says I'm Special |
| "Jump into My Heart and Stay" | 2012 | 39 | Daddy Says I'm Special |

=== Music videos ===
| Title | Year | Album | Director | Source |
|---|---|---|---|---|
| "Jump into My Heart and Stay" | 2012 | Daddy Says I'm Special | Alan Kępski | |
| "Hurry Up" | 2013 | Wounds and Bruises | Zuza Krajewska | |

== Awards and nominations ==
=== Fryderyk ===
| Year | Nominee / work | Award | Result |
|---|---|---|---|
| 2013 | Kari Amirian | Debut of the Year | Nominated |
