= Pustki (band) =

Polish alternative rock band

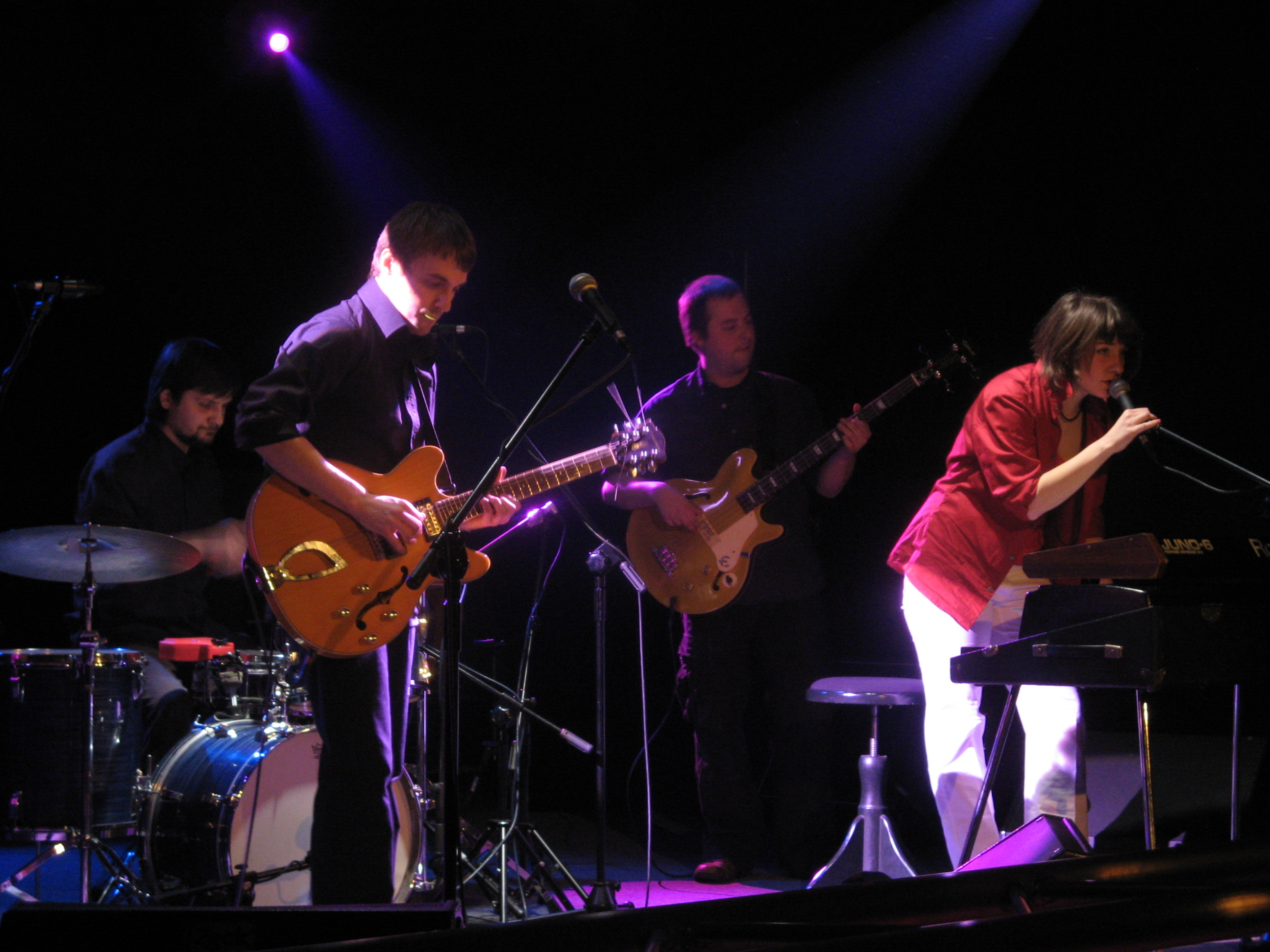
- Pustki in concert (2008)

Background information
- Origin: Ostrówek, Poland
- Genres: Alternative rock, post-rock, pop
- Years active: 1999–present
- Labels: Agora SA, Polskie Radio
- Members: Radek Łukasiewicz; Grzegorz Śluz; Barbara Wrońska
- Past members: Łukasz Nowak; Milena Łukasiewicz; Daniel Pigoński; Filip Zawada; Janek Piętka; Szymon Tarkowski
- Website: www.pustki.pl

Pustki is a Polish alternative rock band founded in 1999 in Ostrówek, and based in Warsaw since 2007. The line-up consists of Radek Łukasiewicz, Grzegorz Śluz and Barbara Wrońska. Pustki were hailed 'Band of the Year' 2008 by Polskie Radio Program III and Pulp magazine, and received nominations for Fryderyk award and Paszport Polityki.

== History ==
The band was founded in August 1999 in Ostrówek by guitarist Radek Łukasiewicz, drummer Grzegorz Śluz and vocalist and bassist Janek Piętka. They were joined by percussionist Milena Łukasiewicz and keyboardist Daniel Pigoński. Pustki's debut album Studio Pustki, promoted by the song "Patyczak", was released in 2001 and gathered positive reviews from music critics. In 2002, Milena Łukasiewicz and Daniel Pigoński left the band. Janek Piętka gave up bass guitar to play the keyboards, and the line-up was completed by bassist Filip Zawada. In April 2004, Pustki released the sophomore album 8 Ohm, on which Barbara Wrońska appeared for the first time as a vocalist, violinist and keyboardist.

The band released its third studio album, Do Mi No, in March 2006. Songs like "Telefon do przyjaciela", "Tchu mi brak" and "Słabość chwilowa" brought Pustki a fair amount of popularity, and Do Mi No remains the group's best selling album to date. In July 2006, Pustki performed at Open'er Festival in Gdynia. The band has also recorded music for films Doskonałe popołudnie directed by Przemysław Wojcieszek, Bodo Kox's Marco P. i złodzieje rowerów, and 1924 Sovet film Aelita, and three theatre plays directed by Przemysław Wojcieszek. At the beginning of 2007, Zawada left the group, followed by Piętka a few months later. Barbara Wrońska became the primary vocalist, and in April 2007 Szymon Tarkowski joined the line-up as the new bassist. Around the same time, the band moved from Ostrówek to Warsaw.

On 17 October 2008, Pustki released the fourth studio album titled Koniec kryzysu. It was promoted by the single "Parzydełko". The band was nominated to various awards, including Paszport Polityki and Fryderyk in the category 'Album of the Year – Alternative'. Polskie Radio Program III and Pulp magazine hailed Pustki the 'Band of the Year', and Koniec kryzysu 'Album of the Year 2008'. In October 2009, the band released an album titled Kalambury, incorporating poetry by Danuta Wawiłow, Bolesław Leśmian, Stanisław Wyspiański and Władysław Broniewski. The album featured guest appearances by Katarzyna Nosowska and Artur Rojek. A year later, Pustki released their first concert DVD, recorded in Alwernia near Kraków.

In July 2011, Pustki performed on the main stage at Open'er Festival, as one of the supports for Coldplay.

== Band members ==
Current members

- Radek Łukasiewicz – guitar, vocals (1999–present)
- Grzegorz Śluz – drums (1999–present)
- Barbara Wrońska – piano, vocals (2004–present)

Past members

- Łukasz Nowak – keyboards (1999–2000)
- Milena Łukasiewicz – percussion (1999–2001)
- Daniel Pigoński – keyboards (2000–2002)
- Filip Zawada – bass guitar (2002–2006)
- Janek Piętka – vocals, bass guitar, keyboards, guitar, percussion (1999–2007)
- Szymon Tarkowski – bass guitar (2007–2012)

== Discography ==
=== Studio albums ===
Title	Album details	Peak chart positions
Title	Album details	POL
Studio Pustki	Released: 28 February 2001; Label: Antena Krzyku	—
8 Ohm	Released: 19 April 2004; Label: Polskie Radio	—
Do Mi No	Released: 20 March 2006; Label: Polskie Radio	30
Koniec kryzysu	Released: 17 October 2008; Label: Agora SA	—
Kalambury	Released: 23 October 2009; Label: Agora SA	—
Safari	Released: 7 March 2014; Label: Agora SA, Art2 Music	—

=== Video albums ===
Title	Video details
Najmniejszy koncert świata	Released: October 28, 2010; Label: Agora SA; Formats: DVD
