= Polepione dźwięki =

Studio album by Fisz
- Released: 2000
- Genre: Hip-hop
- Length: 51:30
- Label: Asfalt Records
- Producer: DJ M.A.D. (Emade)

Fisz chronology
Polepione dźwięki (2000)	Na wylot (2001)

Polepione dźwięki is the first solo album by rapper and alternative artist Fisz. The album is widely considered as a breakthrough on Polish hip-hop scene and received very positive reviews. Instead of dealing with joint smoking and women as many hip-hop artist did at a time, Fisz touched the subjects such as shallow talk ("Bla, bla, bla"), money ("D.C.P."), love ("Drewno"), aggression and hate ("Nienawiść"). Fisz sources Native Tongues Posse as an inspiration in making of this record.

In 2000 it was nominated to Hip-hop Album of The Year at Fryderyk Awards.

== Track listing ==
1. "D.C.P" - 4:18
2. "Bla Bla Bla" - 5:10
3. "Drewno" - 4:53 ("Wood")
4. "Język Wszechświata" (feat. Peteero) - 4:23 ("Language of the Universe")
5. "Nienawiść" - 3:16 ("Resent")
6. "Polepiony" - 4:09 ("Bound Together")
7. "Balon" (feat. Mamadou Diouf) - 4:58 ("Balloon")
8. "Huragan" (Album) - 3:55 ("Hurricane")
9. "Czerwona Sukienka" - 5:35 ("The Red Dress")
10. "Stop" - 5:21
11. "Bla Bla Bla" (600V w autobusie Remix) - 5:32

== Singles ==
1. "Polepiony"
