= June (Polish band) =

Polish soul/jazz band

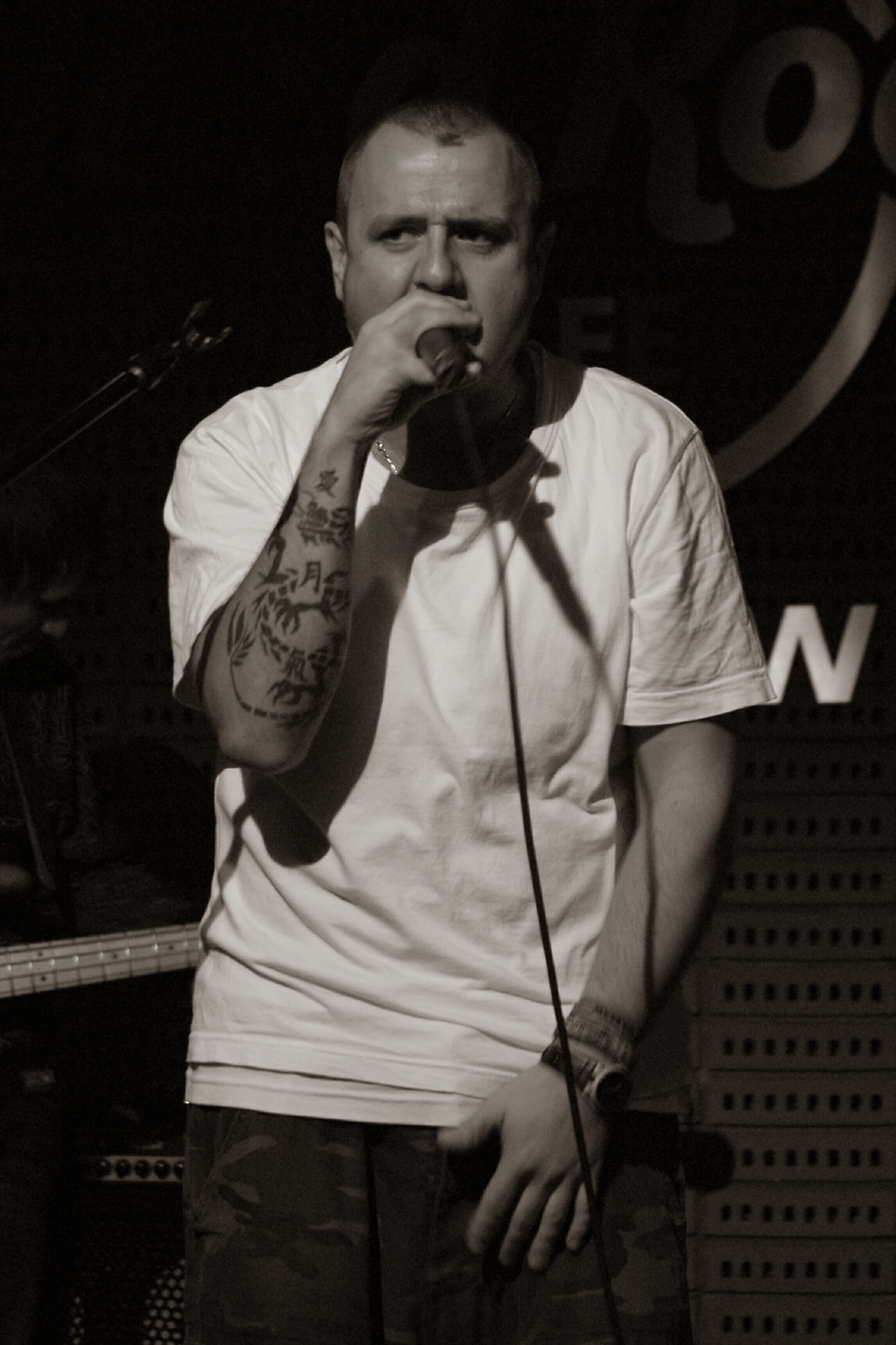
- Robert Cichy performing at the concert of June in 2009

Background information
- Origin: Poland
- Genres: Soul, jazz, alternative pop, R'n'B
- Years active: 2008–present
- Labels: Kayax
- Members: Jan Smoczyński; Robert Cichy; Krzysztof Pacan.
- Website: june.com.pl

June is a Polish band playing a mixture of soul and jazz. It was founded in 2008 by musicians/music producers Jan Smoczyński, Robert Cichy and Krzysztof Pacan. All three musicians have previously worked with Polish artists such as Smolik, Anna Maria Jopek, Michał Urbaniak, Urszula Dudziak, Ania Dąbrowska. In 2009, the band was nominated for a Fryderyk award.

== History ==
=== That's What I Like (2008–2011) ===
The band's debut album That's What I Like was released on 12 September 2008. Polish singer Kayah decided to release it through her label Kayax and made a guest appearance in a song "Be Yourself". The other guest vocalist on the record was Paulina "Pinnawela" Przybysz (formerly Sistars), who sang in "No F No L".

In 2009, the band was nominated for the Fryderyk award in New Face of Fonography category.

=== July Stars (2011–present) ===
June's sophomore album, July Stars, was released in May 2012 as a double album. The second disc contains songs with guest vocals by Urszula Dudziak, Kayah, Kasia Nosowska, Ania Dąbrowska, Aga Zaryan, Mika Urbaniak, Andrzej Dąbrowski, Marcelina Stoszek and Patrycja Gola.

On 4 July 2012, the band performed at the Tent Stage at Open'er Festival.

== Musical style ==
June's music has been influenced by artists like N.E.R.D, OutKast, Jill Scott, Lauryn Hill and Erykah Badu.

== Band members ==
- Jan Smoczyński – piano (2008–present)
- Robert Cichy – guitar, vocals (2008–present)
- Krzysztof Pacan – (2008–present)

== Discography ==
=== Albums ===
Title	Album details
That's What I Like	Released: 12 September 2008; Label: Kayax
July Stars	Released: May 2012; Label: Kayax

== Awards and nominations ==
=== Fryderyk ===
Year	Nominee / work	Award	Result
2009	June	New Face of Fonography	Nominated
