= Świt (song) =

2020 song by Męskie Granie Orkiestra

Single by Męskie Granie Orkiestra 2020 / Daria Zawiałow, Błażej Król and Igo

from the album Męskie Granie 2020
- Released: 1 July 2020
- Recorded: 2020
- Genre: pop
- Length: 3:12
- Label: Agencja LIVE, Kayax Production & Publishing
- Songwriters: Daria Zawiałow; Błażej Król; Igor Walaszek

Męskie Granie singles chronology
"Sobie i Wam" (2019)	"Świt" (2020)	"I ciebie też, bardzo" (2021)

Music video
- "Świt" on YouTube

"Świt" (Polish: [ˈɕfit]; lit. 'The Dawn') is a Polish-language pop song composed and recorded by Daria Zawiałow, Błażej Król and Igor Walaszek (aka Igo) for the 2020 Męskie Granie concert tour. It was released on 1 July 2020. Music video of the song, directed by Daniel Jaroszek, reached 15 million views on the YouTube as of November 2020.

== Chart performance ==
Territory	Chart (2020)	Peak position
Poland	AirPlay – Top	1

== Personnel ==
- vocals: Daria Zawiałow, Błażej Król, Igor Walaszek
