= Wojciech Waglewski =

Polish musician (born 1953)

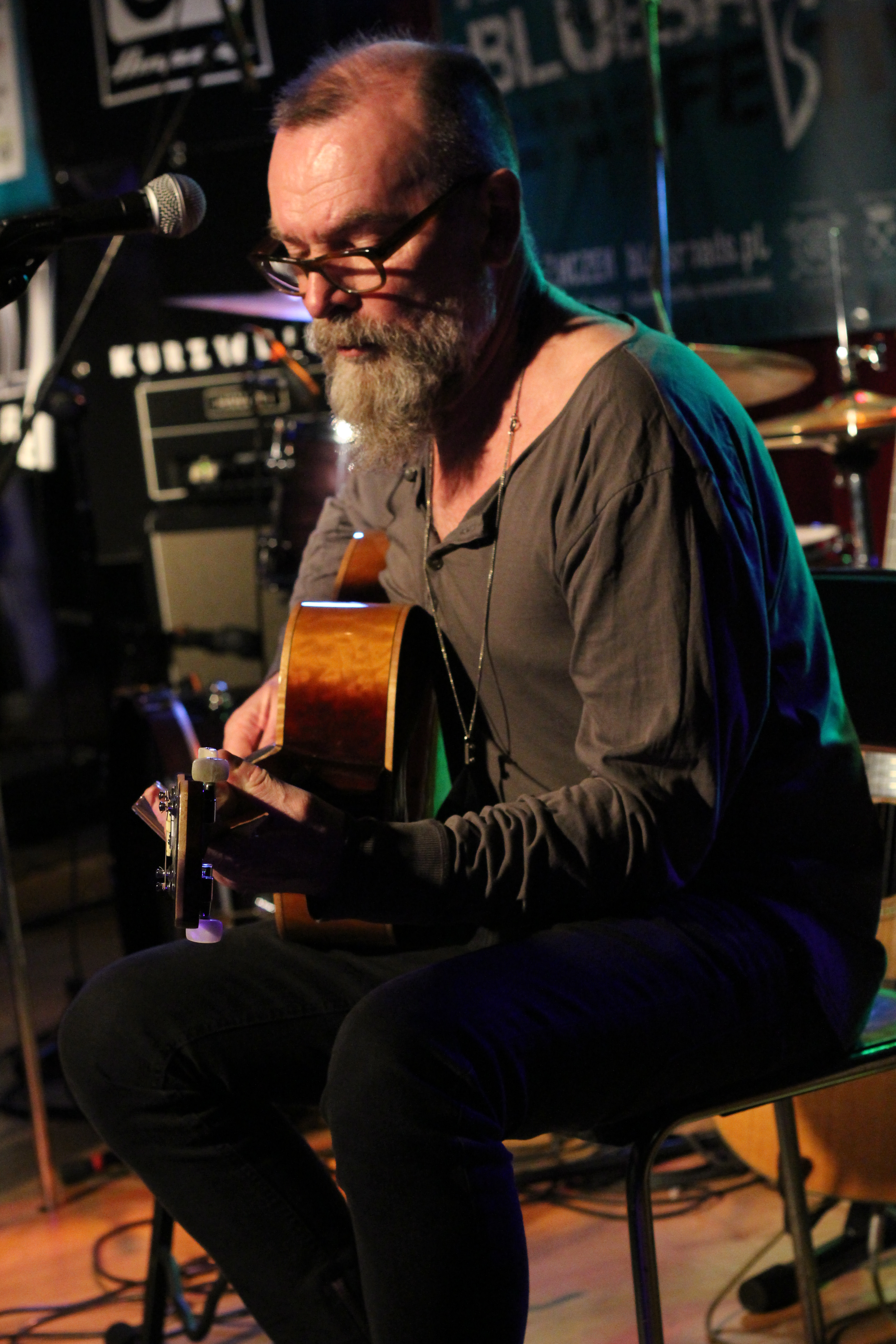
- Waglewski performing at 4th edition of Bluesroads festival in Kraków in 2013
- Born: 21 April 1953 (age 73); Nowy Sącz, Poland
- Occupations: Musician, composer, arranger, music producer, radio personality
- Spouse: Grażyna Waglewska (m. 1975; died 2025)
- Children: Bartosz "Fisz" Waglewski; Piotr "Emade" Waglewski
- Parent(s): Jerzy Waglewski; Barbara Waglewska
- Musical career
- Also known as: Wagiel
- Genres: Rock, folk, jazz
- Instrument: Guitar
- Labels: Polton, Polstar, EMI Music Poland, Agora SA, QM Music
- Formerly of: Osjan, Voo Voo, Morawski Waglewski Nowicki Hołdys, Bemibem

Wojciech Antoni Waglewski (born 21 April 1953) is a Polish musician; singer, guitarist, composer, arranger and producer.

== Biography ==
Waglewski was born on 21 April 1953 in Nowy Sącz. He is the son of Polish journalist Jerzy Waglewski. Wojciech is married to Grażyna, the couple has two sons (both are hip-hop musicians): Fisz (Bartosz, born 1978) and Emade (Piotr, born 1981).

He is a member of Polish Society of the Phonographic Industry and Polish Film Academy. He has played in bands such as Voo Voo, Morawski Waglewski Nowicki Hołdys, Osjan and Bemibem, and also performs as a solo artist. As of 2013, he has been nominated to twenty-three Fryderyk awards (Polish equivalent of Grammy) and won five times. In 2010 and 2011, he was the art director of concert tour Męskie Granie.

== Discography ==
=== Solo albums ===
Title	Album details	Peak chart positions
Title	Album details	POL
Waglewski Gra-żonie	Released: 11 February 1991; Label: Polton	–
Muzyka filmowa	Released: 23 July 2007; Label: EMI Music Poland	–
The Best and the Rest	Released: 27 January 2011; Label: QM Music	14
"—" denotes a release that did not chart.

=== Collaborative albums ===
Title	Album details	Certification
Wagiel & Mateo – Koncert (with Mateusz Pospieszalski)	Released: 20 February 2002; Label: Sony Music	
Koledzy (with Maciej Maleńczuk)	Released: 14 May 2007; Label: Agora SA	POL: Platinum
Męska muzyka (with Fisz and Emade)	Released: 1 February 2008; Label: Agora SA	POL: Platinum
Harmonia (with Ziemowit Kosmowski, Marcin Gałażyn and Marjana Sadowska)	Released: 26 October 2010; Label: Agora SA	

=== Soundtracks ===
Title	Album details
Muzyka od środka	Released: 1 June 1998; Label: Polstar
Jasne błękitne okna	Released: 4 December 2006; Label: EMI Music Poland

== Awards and nominations ==
=== Fryderyk ===
Year	Nominee / work	Award	Result
1994	Wojciech Waglewski	Composer of the Year	Won
1995	Wojciech Waglewski	Producer of the Year	Nominated
1995	Wojciech Waglewski	Composer of the Year	Nominated
1998	Wojciech Waglewski	Producer of the Year	Nominated
1998	Wojciech Waglewski	Composer of the Year	Nominated
1998	Muzyka od środka	Album of the Year – Alternative	Nominated
2001	Wojciech Waglewski	Composer of the Year	Nominated
2006	Wojciech Waglewski	Best Music Production	Won
2006	Wojciech Waglewski	Composer of the Year	Nominated
2008	Wojciech Waglewski	Composer of the Year	Won
2008	Wojciech Waglewski	Writer of the Year	Nominated
2008	Wojciech Waglewski	Male Vocalist of the Year	Nominated
2008	Koledzy	Album of the Year – Pop	Nominated
2008	"Koledzy"	Video of the Year	Nominated
2009	Wojciech Waglewski	Composer of the Year	Won
2009	Wojciech Waglewski	Writer of the Year	Nominated
2009	Męska muzyka	Album of the Year – Alternative	Nominated
2011	Wojciech Waglewski	Composer of the Year	Nominated
2011	Wojciech Waglewski	Writer of the Year	Nominated
2011	Harmonia	Album of the Year – Folk/World Music	Nominated
2011	Voo Voo	Group of the Year	Nominated
2011	Wszyscy muzycy to wojownicy (Voo Voo)	Album of the Year – Rock	Nominated
2011	Męskie granie (with Smolik, Abradab, Maleńczuk, Mitch&Mitch, Pogodno, Fisz Emade, Kim Nowak, DJ Eprom, OXY.GEN, Voo Voo, Jacaszek)	Album of the Year – Alternative	Won
