= Őszibarack =

Polish electronic/pop band

- Origin: Wrocław, Poland
- Genres: electronic, pop, club music
- Years active: 2004–present
- Label: 2–47 Records
- Members: Agim Dżeljilji; Tomasz Dogiel; Jan Emil Młynarski; José Manuel Albán Juárez
- Past members: Marcin Drewnik; Patrycja Hefczyńska
- Website: oszibarack.pl

Őszibarack is a popular Polish electronic/pop band, founded in 2003 in Wrocław. The band name means peach in Hungarian.

The band has performed on major festivals, such as Open'er Festival (2005, 2008 and 2013), Off Festival (2006), Męskie Granie (2013) and Waves Vienna (2012). In 2012, the band received a nomination to Fryderyk award in the category "Album of the Year – Club Music" for the record 40 Surfers Waiting for the Waves.

== History ==
Őszibarack was founded in Wrocław by composer and producer Agim Dżeljilji, bassist Tomasz Dogiel, vocalist Patrycja Hefczyńska and drummer Marcin Drewnik. The band's song "SKIRTS UP!" was used in a commercial of Heyah, a Polish cellular telecommunications provider. Őszibarack's debut album Moshi Moshi was released in 2004 and followed by Plim Plum Plam, released on 25 April 2008.

During the recording of Őszibarack's third album, drummer Marcin Drewnik left the band and was replaced by Jan Emil Młynarski. The album 40 Surfers Waiting for the Waves was released on 25 October 2011 and received positive reviews, with many journalists calling it the best album in the band's career. In 2012, the record was nominated to prestigious Polish music award Fryderyk in the category "Album of the Year – Club Music".

After the release of 40 Surfers Waiting for the Waves, the vocalist Patrycja Hefczyńska left the band. Őszibarack's sound, which was determined by the female voice to that moment, became fully instrumental. The band's fourth album, titled 12, was recorded with new percussionist José Manuel Albán Juárez in May 2012 during a five-day recording sessions, and released on 23 April 2013.

== Band members ==
Current members

- Agim Dżeljilji – electronics, guitar, theremin, producer (2004–present)
- Tomasz Dogiel – bass guitar, double bass, electronics (2004–present)
- Jan Emil Młynarski – drums, electronics (2011–present)
- José Manuel Albán Juárez – percussion (2011–present)

Past members

- Marcin "Zmazik" Drewnik – drums, electronics (2004–2011)
- Patrycja Hefczyńska – vocals, lyrics (2004-2011/2012)

== Discography ==
=== Albums ===
Title	Album details
Moshi Moshi	Released: 2004; Label: 2–47 Records
Plim Plum Plam	Released: 25 April 2008; Label: 2–47 Records
40 Surfers Waiting for the Waves	Released: 25 October 2011; Label: Chaos Management Group
12	Released: 23 April 2013; Label: 2–47 Records

== Awards and nominations ==
=== Fryderyk ===
Year	Nominee / work	Award	Result
2012	40 Surfers Waiting for the Waves	Album of the Year – Club Music	Nominated
