= Jacek Ostaszewski =

Polish musician (born 1944)

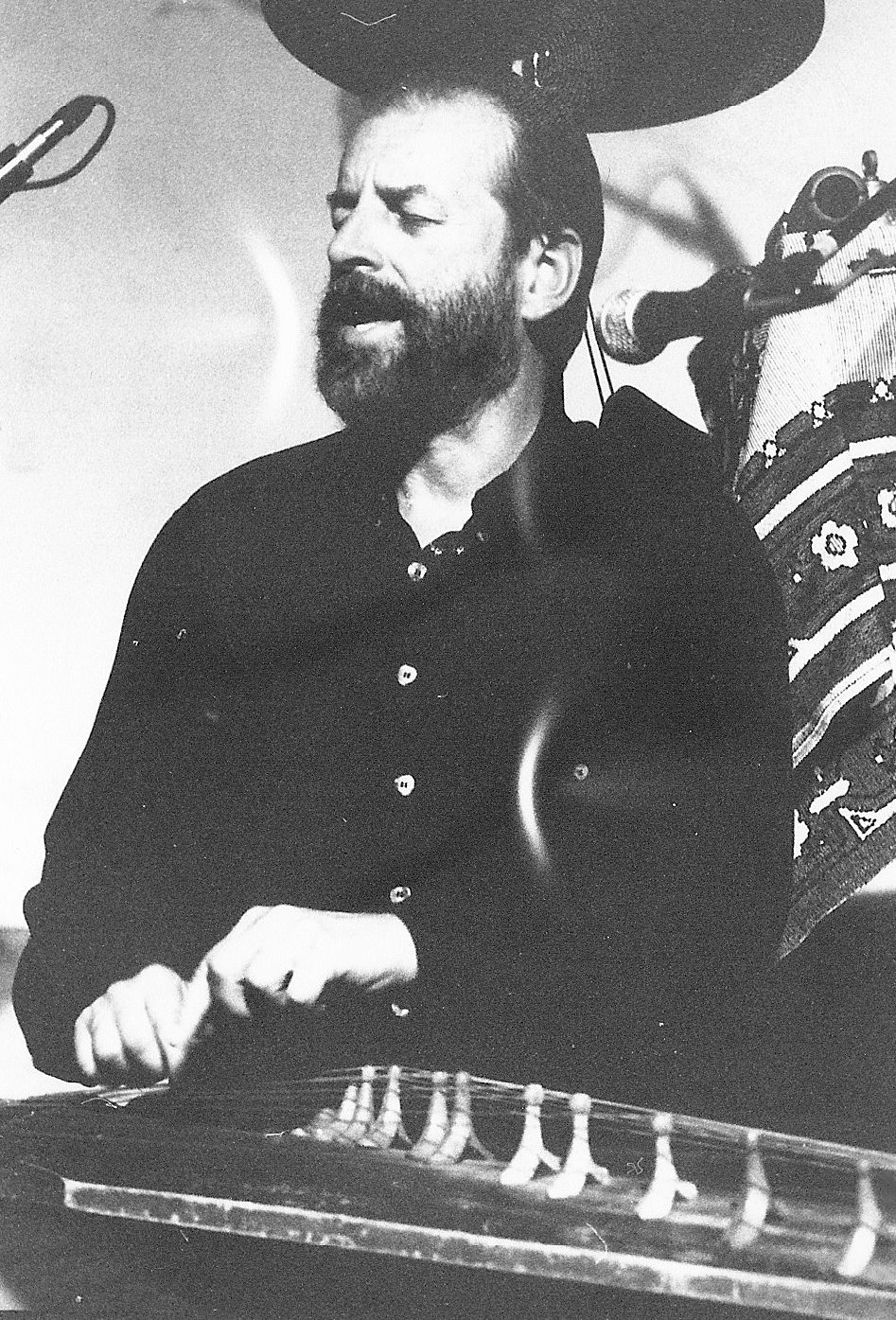
- Jacek Ostaszewski
- Born: 5 May 1944 (age 82)
- Citizenship: Polish
- Occupation: Musician

Jacek Ostaszewski (born 5 May 1944) is a musician, double bassist, flautist, composer and theatre director.

== Biography ==
He is the son of Tadeusz Ostaszewski, a sculptor and professor at the Kraków Academy of Fine Arts, and Krystyna Ostaszewska née Dębowska, an actress at the Rhapsodic Theatre in Kraków. He is the husband of Małgorzata Ostaszewska and the father of Maja Ostaszewska.

In the early 1970s he was a co-founder (with Marek Jackowski) and leader of the Osjan group. As a jazz musician, he has collaborated with Marek Grechuta and the Anawa band, Tomasz Stańko, Adam Makowicz, Krzysztof Komeda, Don Cherry, Andrzej Kurylewicz, Andrzej Trzaskowski and Włodzimierz Nahorny, among others.

He composed music for theatre, for the plays Kalkwerk and Lunatycy, directed by Krystian Lupa at the Stary Theatre in Kraków, among others, ballet, and film. He was a lecturer at the State Drama School in Kraków.
