= Voo Voo =

Polish rock band

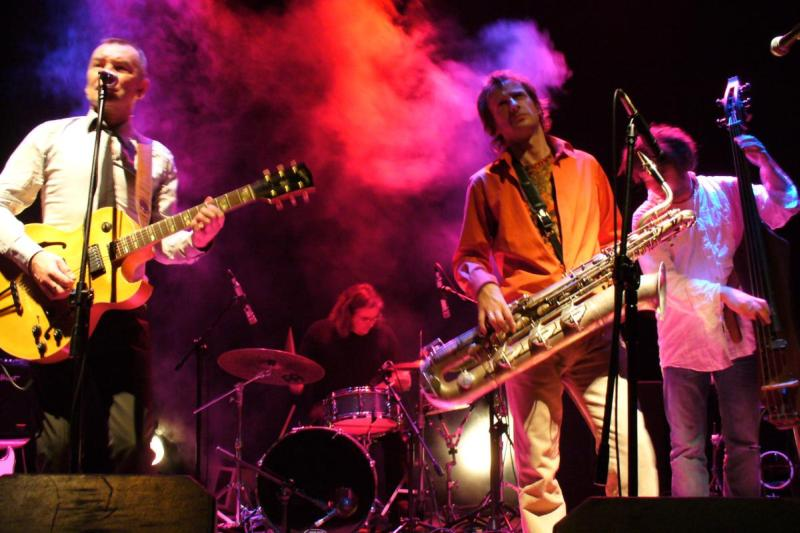

Background information
- Origin: Poland
- Genres: Pop, rock
- Labels: Zic Zac, Agencja Artystyczna MTJ, Polskie Nagrania Muza, Pomaton, Pomaton EMI, Digiton, Polton, EMI Music Poland, Agora SA, Sony Music Entertainment Poland
- Members: Wojciech Waglewski; Mateusz Pospieszalski; Karim Martusewicz; Michał Bryndal
- Past members: Andrzej Nowicki; Wojciech Morawski; Milo Kurtis; Marek Czapelski; Jan Pospieszalski; Andrzej Ryszka; Piotr Żyżelewicz
- Website: voovoo.pl (in Polish)

Voo Voo is a Polish music band that was established in 1985. The group's musical style is highly diverse, predominantly characterized by a fusion of rock and folk elements from various cultures, intertwined with a notable emphasis on improvisation. In more recent times, their creative repertoire has also embraced contemporary music genres like drum and bass, hip-hop, and nu jazz.

The band's name derives from the initials of its founder and frontman, Wojciech Waglewski, with "W. W." being rendered according to English phonetic conventions.

Voo Voo maintains an active association with a fan club known as "Wannolot." This fan club releases albums that cater to enthusiasts of the band, featuring live recordings, interviews, and tracks by the band that are not officially released through standard channels.

== Group history ==
Voo Voo was established in 1985, emerging from the core members of the Morawski Waglewski Nowicki Hołdys ensemble. Initially, Voo Voo comprised Wojciech Waglewski, Andrzej Nowicki (bass guitar), Wojciech Morawski (drums), and Milo Kurtis (percussion and trumpet). In the inaugural performances of 1985, Morawski was later succeeded by Marek Czapelski. With this lineup, the band made its debut at the Jarocin festival.

Subsequently, Nowicki, Kurtis, and Czapelski departed from the band. The Pospieszalski brothers then took their place: Jan Pospieszalski on bass guitar and double bass, Mateusz Pospieszalski on saxophone, and Andrzej Ryszka (formerly of Tie Break, ex-Krzak) joined. During the early 90s, Piotr "Stopa" Żyżelewicz assumed the role of drummer, succeeding Andrzej Ryszka, who remained the drummer of Voo Voo until his passing on May 12, 2011.

In 1997, the group participated in the electoral campaign of AWS. Subsequently, in 1998, Jan Pospieszalski departed from the band to concentrate on media endeavors. Karim Martusewicz stepped in to take his place.

== Band members ==
- Wojciech Waglewski – guitar, main vocals, and lyrics. Founder and leader of the band; its name comes from his initials (the English pronunciation of "Voo Voo" sounds like Polish pronunciation of "W.W."). Father of Bartosz Waglewski and Piotr Waglewski, better known as Fisz and Emade. He also plays with the bands "Osjan" and "Gaia".
- Mateusz Pospieszalski – saxophone, flute, bass clarinet, keyboard instruments, accordion, vocals. He also played with the band "Maanam". Currently playing with the bands "Tie Break" and "GRAAL", also Stanisław Sojka.
- Piotr "Stopa" Żyżelewicz (died 12 May 2011) – drums. He cooperated with the bands Armia and Izrael and 2Tm2,3.
- Karim Martusewicz – double bass, bass guitar, has played with Voo Voo since February 1998.
- Mamadou Diouf from Senegal – vocals. He has been cooperating with Voo Voo since 1994.

== Discography ==
=== Studio albums ===
Title	Album details	Peak chart positions	Sales	Certifications
Title	Album details	POL	Sales	Certifications
Voo Voo	Released: October 6, 1986; Label: Pronit	—		
Sno-powiązałka	Released: May 4, 1987; Label: Pronit	—		
Małe Wu Wu	Released: August 8, 1988; Label: Polskie Nagrania Muza	—		
Z środy na czwartek	Released: October 16, 1989; Label: Polskie Nagrania Muza	—		
Zespół gitar elektrycznych	Released: June 6, 1991; Label: Digiton	—		
Tam tam i tu	Released: 1991; Label: Zic Zac	—		
Łobi jabi	Released: October 4, 1993; Label: Tonpress	—		
Zapłacono	Released: November 14, 1994; Label: Polton	—		
Rapatapa-to-ja	Released: December 4, 1995; Label: Polton	—		
Flota zjednoczonych sił	Released: May 5, 1997; Label: Polton	—		
Oov Oov	Released: September 7, 1998; Label: Music Corner Records	—		
Kalejdoskop	Released: November 8, 1999; Label: Music Corner Records	—		
Płyta z muzyką	Released: February 12, 2001; Label: Sony Music	1		
Płyta	Released: February 18, 2002; Label: Sony Music	5		
Voo Voo z kobietami	Released: October 13, 2003; Label: Sony Music	8		
XX Cz.1	Released: March 17, 2005; Label: Sony BMG	15		
21	Released: March 17, 2006; Label: Pomaton EMI	6		
Tischner	Released: March 12, 2007; Label: Agora SA	—	POL: 15,000+	POL: Gold
Małe Wu Wu śpiewa wiersze ks. Jana Twardowskiego	Released: December 12, 2007; Label: Agora SA	—		
Samo Voo Voo	Released: October 10, 2008; Label: EMI Music Poland	12		
Voo Voo i Haydamaky	Released: June 4, 2009; Label: Agora SA	—	POL: 15,000+	POL: Gold
Wszyscy muzycy to wojownicy	Released: November 16, 2010; Label: EMI Music Poland	20		
Nowa płyta	Released: October 18, 2012; Label: Agora SA	—		
Dobry wieczór	Released: October 24, 2014; Label: Agora SA	13		
7	Released March 7, 2017; Label: Agora SA	4		
"—" pozycja nie była notowana.

=== Video albums ===
Title	Video details
Przystanek Woodstock 2004–2009	Released: 2010; Label: Złoty Melon; Formats: DVD
Najmniejszy koncert świata with Haydamaky	Released: October 22, 2010; Label: Agora SA; Formats: DVD
