= EL.P =

Studio album by L.Stadt
- Released: 6 December 2010
- Recorded: December 2008 – June 2010
- Genre: Alternative rock, indie rock, garage rock, surf rock, blues rock
- Label: Mystic Production
- Producer: Łukasz Lach, L.Stadt

L.Stadt chronology
L.Stadt (2008)	EL.P (2010)	You Gotta Move (2013)

EL.P is the second studio album by Polish rock band L.Stadt. It was released on 6 December 2010 through major Polish independent label Mystic Production. The record was mixed and mastered by Mikael "Count" Eldridge, known for his work with DJ Shadow, Radiohead and No Doubt.

== Promotion ==
The album was promoted by several music videos. In September 2010, a video for "Death of a Surfer Girl" directed by Marcel Sawicki was released. A video for "Fashion Freak" premiered in June 2011 and a video for "Smooth", directed by Kasia Sawicka, was released in November 2011.

== Reception ==
The album received positive reviews. Piotr Metz wrote in Wprost magazine, "The best Polish album of 2011? Who knows. Although, technically, it was released last year, its state of mind is way ahead. World class." Marek Sierocki said on TVP, "For me, the big discovery was L.Stadt and their second album. I think if it had been released in England and properly promoted, it would have had a chance for real success." "All we can do is listen and applaud that Poles can do it so well.", wrote Robert Sankowski in his review in Gazeta Wyborcza. And Marek Świrkowicz of Teraz Rock magazine wrote: "L.Stadt (...) Like an unruly youngster who loves to get dressed up at the party and constantly surprise unwitting old geezers. It's been a long time since I enjoyed a Polish record this much."

In March 2011, Simon Le Bon of Duran Duran wrote on Twitter: "Listening to "Death of a Surfer Girl". Wow the singer's got a great voice, reminds me of... of... got it ... sounds just like Billy Idol."

== Track listing ==
All lyrics are written by Łukasz Lach; all music is composed by Łukasz Lach and L.Stadt, except where noted.

No.	Title	Length
1.	"Death of a Surfer Girl"	2:43
2.	"Fashion Freak"	2:51
3.	"Smooth"	3:21
4.	"Ciggies"	2:49
5.	"Charmin/Lola"	3:06
6.	"Puppet's Song No1" (lyrics by John Hodgetts)	3:13
7.	"Mumms Attack"	2:09
8.	"Sun" (music and lyrics by Adam Lewartowski, Łukasz Lach, Daniel Lukic)	3:30
9.	"Jeff" (lyrics by John Hodgetts)	4:16

== Personnel ==
L.Stadt

- Łukasz Lach – lead vocals, guitar, piano, electronics
- Adam Lewartowski – bass guitar, scratching
- Radosław Bolewski – drums
- Andrzej Sieczkowski – percussion

Technical personnel

- Łukasz Lach – production
- L.Stadt – production
- Mikael "Count" Eldridge – mixing, mastering
