= Helios (cinemas) =

"HELIOS" S.A. is a multiplex cinema operator in Poland, established in 1992. It is one of Poland's major cinema operators. Since August 2010, Agora is the owner.

== Current locations ==
- Białystok (Galeria Biała) - 8 screens
- Białystok (Alfa Centrum) - 7 screens
- Bielsko-Biała - 7 screens
- Dąbrowa Górnicza - 5 screens
- Gdańsk - 8 screens
- Gniezno - 3 screens
- Gorzów Wielkopolski - 5 screens
- Kalisz - 7 screens
- Katowice - 9 screens
- Kielce - 7 screens
- Konin - 2 screens
- Legnica - 5 screens
- Lubin - 5 screens
- Łódź - 2 screens
- Nowy Sącz - 5 screens
- Olsztyn - 8 screens
- Opole - 6 screens
- Piła - 4 screens
- Piotrków Trybunalski - 5 screens
- Płock - 5 screens
- Poznań - 8 screens
- Radom - 5 screens
- Rzeszów - 4 screens
- Sosnowiec - 4 screens
- Szczecin - 4 screens
- Tczew - 4 screens
- Warsaw (Blue City) - 8 screens
- Wrocław - (Aleja Bielany) 8 screens
- Wrocław (Magnolia Park) - 7 screens
- Wrocław (Centrum Marino) - 9 screens (Autumn 2025)
