= Osjan =

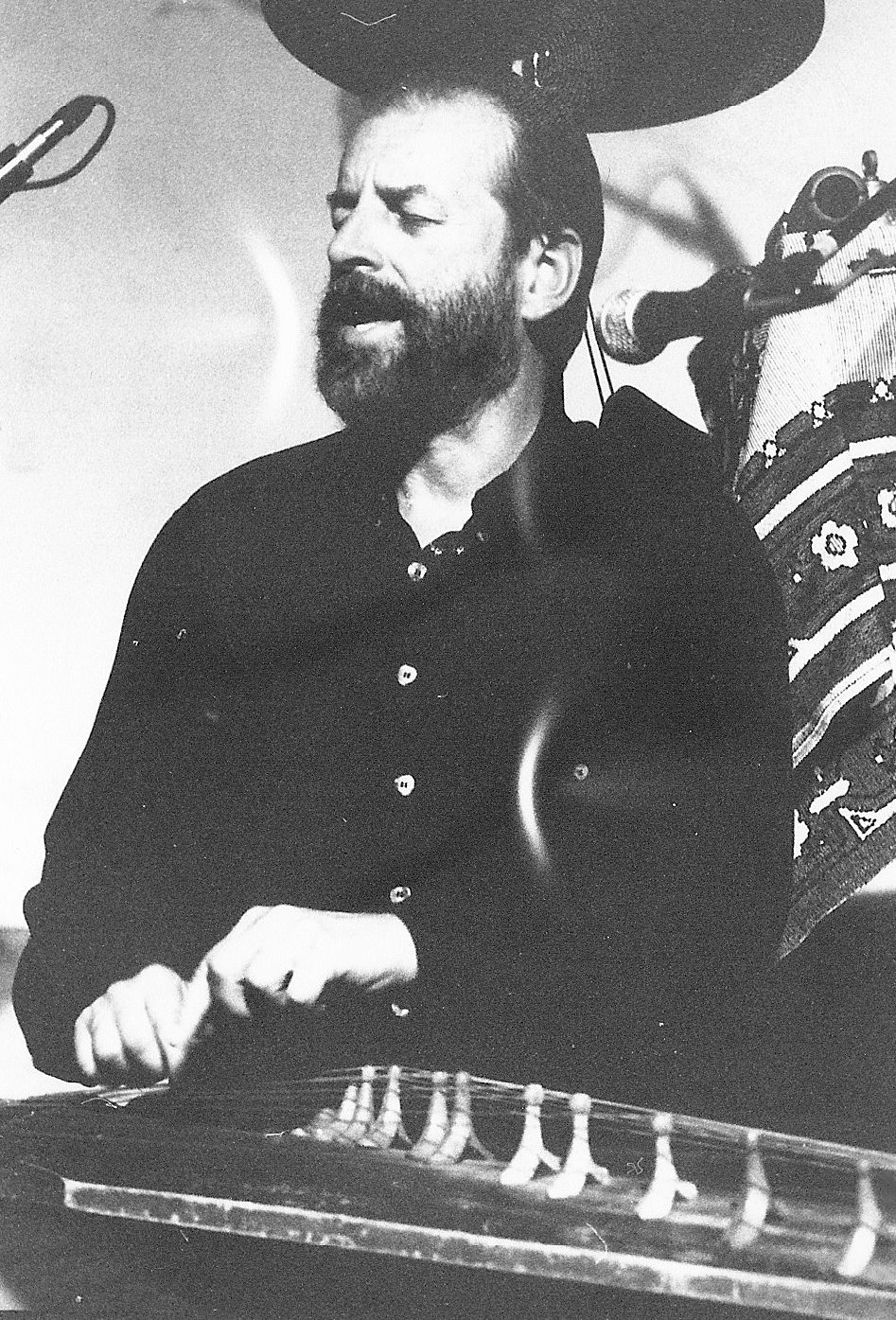
Jacek Ostaszewski of Osjan

Osjan (originally Ossian) is a Polish music band active from 1970 until 2012.

Osjan was formed in 1971 by Jacek Ostaszewski and Marek Jackowski (who later moved to Maanam). Over the years, the musicians performing with Osjan often changed. The members of the group included Ostaszewski, Wojciech Waglewski, Milo Kurtis, Radosław Nowakowski, Jorgos Skolias, Tomasz Hołuj, and Zygmunt Kaczmarski. Collaborators of Osjan included Don Cherry, Tomasz Stańko, Antymos Apostolis, Paweł Jarzębski, and Jerzy Słomiński.
