= Agora (company) =

Polish public mass media company

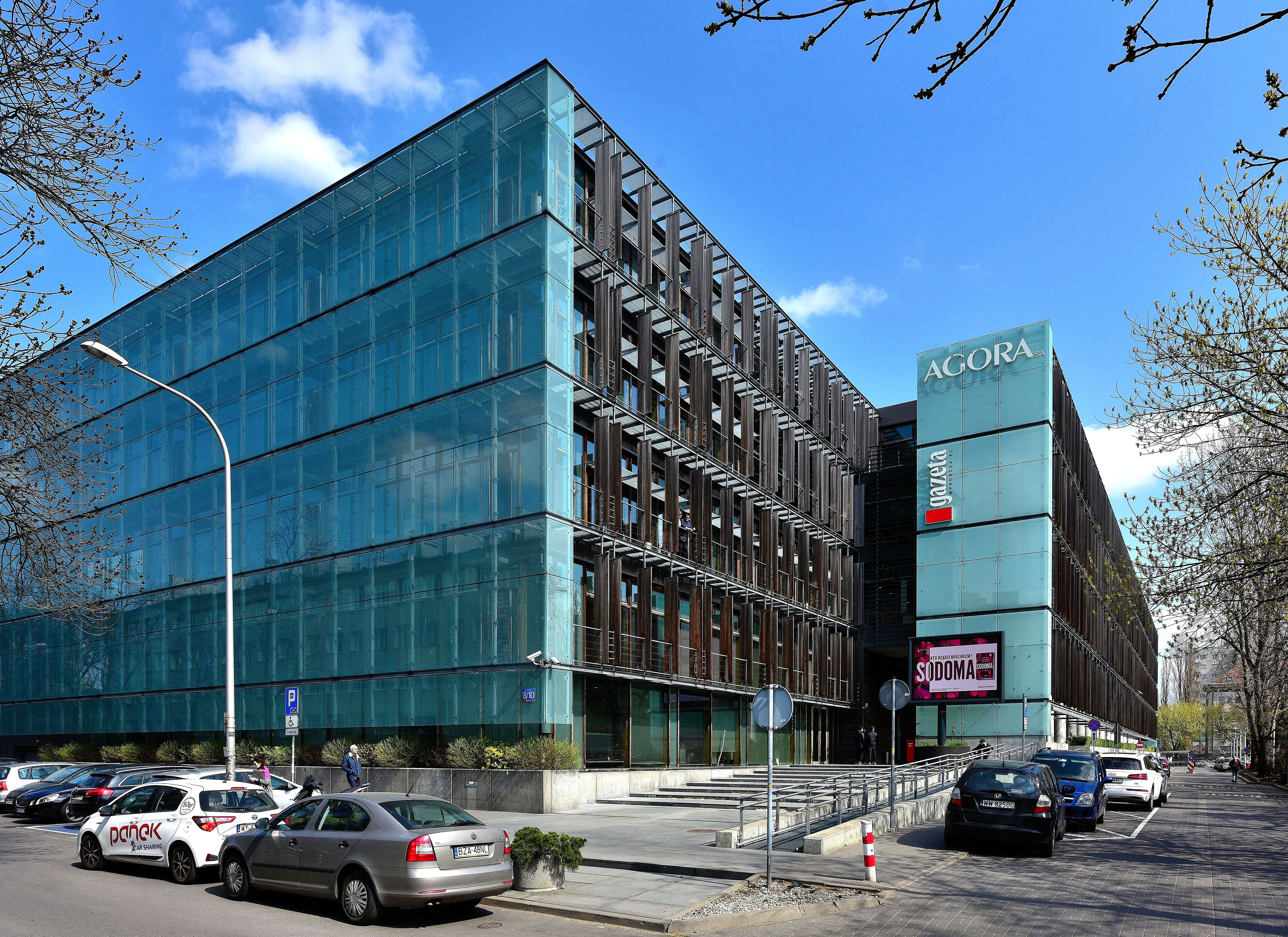
- Agora's headquarters in Warsaw.
- Type: Public
- Traded as: WSE: AGO; LSE: 0MNM
- Industry: Mass media
- Founded: Warsaw, Poland (1989)
- Headquarters: Warsaw, Poland
- Key people: Bartosz Hojka (Executive Chairman); Adam Michnik (Co-founder)
- Products: Gazeta Wyborcza
- Revenue: ▲PLN 836.5 million (2020)
- Number of employees: 2277 (2020)
- Website: agora.pl

Agora Spółka Akcyjna (Agora SA) is a Polish media company. Agora and Gazeta Wyborcza (The Electoral Gazette) were created on the eve of the parliamentary elections in 1989. Gazeta Wyborcza became the first independent newspaper in Poland, while Agora grew into one of the largest and most renowned media companies in Poland. Since 1999 Agora's shares have been listed on the Warsaw Stock Exchange.

Agora's activities include newspapers, advertising, cinemas, radio, various online services, magazines, books and more.

== Agora's business ==
Former logo of Agora, used until 2025

Agora's flagship business is Gazeta Wyborcza, which in 2012 was Poland's largest daily with 3.48 million readers, and sold 257 thousand copies per day that year. "Wyborcza" combines a national newspaper with regional pages and thematic supplements. In 2012 "Wyborcza" advertising sales reached PLN 202.9 million, while its share in the newspaper advertising market was 36.5%.

Agora also publishes a free newspaper Metro, the third most read nationwide daily in Poland. In 2012, Metro distributed 348 thousand copies in 18 Polish cities. It is the only free nationwide daily in the Polish newspaper market.

Agora is also present in the outdoor advertising through its subsidiary company AMS, one of the leading players in out-of-home advertising. In 2012, the advertising sales of AMS reached PLN 162.1 million and its share in the outdoor advertising market stood at almost 30%.

Agora owns a majority stake in Helios, the second largest cinema operator in Poland. Helios was established in 1993 and following acquisitions (including the 5 multiplex cinemas under the Kinoplex brand in 2007) it operates 31 cinemas in Poland including 30 multiplexes and one traditional cinema. As of 31 December 2012, Helios cinemas offered a total of 166 screens and almost 356 thousand seats.

Currently, Agora owns over several dozens of themed, classified, entertainment and social services belonging to the Gazeta.pl group: Gazeta.pl, Wyborcza.pl, Blox.pl and Sport.pl as well as portals and classified services GazetaPraca.pl and Domiporta.pl.

Agora also offers Internet film series and content from its Internet services by means of mobile technology. Online advertising service agencies include GlossyMedia.pl, SearchLab.pl, AdPlayer.pl, PayPer.pl and HandyNet.pl. At the end of 2012, the total reach of Gazeta.pl Group's Internet services amounted to 59.1%, to 11.4 million users, allowing Gazeta.pl Group to become the third biggest portal in Poland.

Agora owns a group of local radio stations operating under two brands: Złote Przeboje (English: Golden Hits) and Rock Radio (modern rock format – formerly Roxy FM, playing varied indie music), a regional news station TOK FM, and an Internet radio platform Tuba with the service tuba FM which was the first one in Poland to offer its users creation and sharing of radio channels.

Publishing activities of Agora comprise several color magazines on topics including shopping, interior design, culinary, parenting and lifestyle issues. Combined paid circulation of Agora's monthlies in 2012 was over 875 thousand copies.

Currently, apart from the standard activity such as publishing and distribution of book series, the company operates in new fields such as co-production and distribution of large-screen films (for example Drogówka) as well as co-production of cultural events including Woody Allen's concert in Warsaw.

Agora tried to build its own group shopping portal HappyDay.pl. This was closed on 2 January 2014.

=== Gazeta Wyborcza ===
Gazeta Wyborcza was founded in 1989 as the platform for the first democratic parliamentary elections. It was created by a group of journalists and activists of the underground democratic opposition press. Since the beginning, the newspaper's Editor-in-Chief has been Adam Michnik, a member of the opposition in the 1960–1980s.

The online edition of Gazeta Wyborcza, Wyborcza.pl, is one of the most popular websites of press titles in Poland.

=== Gazeta.pl ===
Gazeta.pl
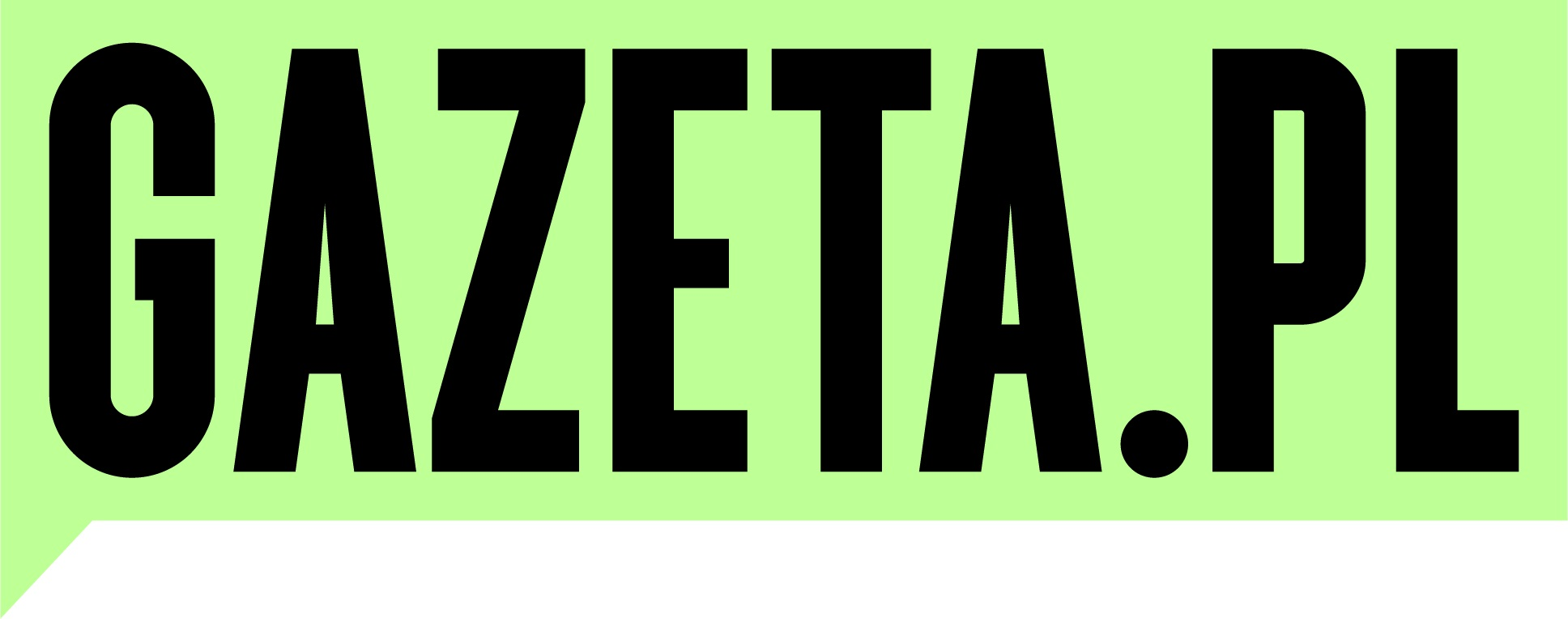
- Website type: Web portal
- Available in: Polish
- Owner: Agora SA
- Website: gazeta.pl
- Commercial: yes

The portal gazeta.pl. was split off from Wyborcza newspaper in 2008. Previously it was used as a website for the Wyborcza newspaper. Unlike Wyborcza, gazeta.pl is focused on 'lighter' news: celebrity gossip, entertainment and sports.

The content published in portal is created by the editorial teams of Gazeta.pl and the journalists from Agora Radio Group, who work together in a newsroom. The editorial teams may also use a TV studio where news information and entertainment materials are shot, for example, editorial cycles, interviews, news programs for Gazeta.pl and Internet television Gazeta.tv. The content from the websites comprising Gazeta.pl are available in mobile versions as well as applications for smartphones ("Gazeta.pl for iPhone") and for Samsung TV sets.

As the first portal in Poland, Gazeta.pl initiated live transmission of the important events and now includes other editorial and audiovisual materials.

The company operates Internet forums: Forum.Gazeta.pl and the blog platform Blox.pl, until its shutdown in April 2019. Gazeta.pl, as one of the largest portals in Poland, also syndicates content from providers abroad including Microsoft, Google, Opera Software, Dailymotion and VideoJug.

=== Agora Foundation ===
In 2004, the Agora Foundation, a public benefit organization, was founded. The Foundation focuses on "co-organizing and financing social campaigns initiated by Gazeta Wyborcza. These actions are financed from the annual fundraising of 1 percent, a tax deduction for which a special sub-account has been created at the Foundation." Since 2017, the Agora Foundation is also a member organization of the European Press Prize.

== Record label ==
Since 2007 Agora SA releases musical albums, DVDs and special box sets of such artists as Kayah, Maciej Maleńczuk, Wojciech Waglewski, Voo Voo, Ewa Bem, Edyta Górniak, Marek Kościkiewicz, Marek Dyjak, Fisz, Emade, Pustki, Dagadana, Cool Kids of Death, Magda Navarette, Lech Janerka, Maria Peszek, Muniek Staszczyk and Hey among others.

Agora SA releases albums formally as books (including ISBN), as of VAT value for musical albums in Poland is 22% with that for books is 0%. That enables the albums to be charted on OLiS (Official Sales Chart). Although many of Agora SA releases was certified Gold and Platinum by Polish Society of the Phonographic Industry (ZPAV).
