= L. Stadt =

Polish rock band

L.Stadt
- Origin: Łódź, Poland
- Genres: Rock, indie rock surf rock, psychedelic rock, indie rock
- Years active: 2003–present
- Label: Mystic Production
- Members: Łukasz Lach; Adam Lewartowski; Piotr Gwadera; Andrzej Sieczkowski
- Past members: Radek Bolewski
- Website: l.stadt.io

L.Stadt is a Polish band, playing rock music with elements of surf rock, country and psychedelic rock. It was founded in Łódź in 2003 and named after the city's name under the Nazi occupation, Litzmannstadt. The band has released two studio albums, L.Stadt (2008) and EL.P (2010), and an extended play You Gotta Move (2013).

L.Stadt received critical acclaim and was hailed the hope of Polish alternative music by major media in Poland. The band has also performed at major festivals in Poland and abroad, including concerts at Open'er Festival, PKO BP London Live at Wembley Arena, and SXSW in the U.S.

== History ==
=== Early years (2003–07) ===
L.Stadt was founded by vocalist/guitarist/keyboardist Łukasz Lach (former member of bands Puzzle and L.O. 27, also musician for Hedone and Renata Przemyk) and drummer Radek Bolewski (playing with Elżbieta Adamiak and Krystyna Prońko), soon joined by members of band Kisiel, bassist Adam Lewartowski and drummer Andrzej Sieczkowski. The band members come from Łódź, but met in Stuttgart.

L.Stadt debuted in 2003, playing at Camerimage Festival. In 2004, the band performed in Munich and Stuttgart in Germany, and at Class'EuRock Festival in Aix-en-Provence, France. A year later it participated in Festiwal Dialogu Czterech Kultur, and in 2006, it was the first act to perform at "Łódź Alternatywna", a concert transmitted live by TVP Łódź and Radio Łódź.

Around the same time, the band was among the finalists of Gazeta Wyborcza's contest "Gra Muzyka", and was hailed "the Polish White Stripes". L.Stadt got a lot of media attention and started looking for a label to publish the debut album, but all the negotiations were coming to an end because the band had one condition: that the record label wouldn't interfere with the recordings. It changed after the band participated in a contest called OFF-scena, organized by Polish national radio station Trójka, newsmagazine Przekrój and portal Onet.pl. L.Stadt was among 4 winners (out of 374 participants), and the band was invited to play on the first day of Off Festival 2007.

=== L.Stadt (2007–09) ===
The performance at OFF Festival increased the demand for L.Stadt, and the band soon managed to find a record label. Around the same time, the band's music was used in a play titled Yotam in Teatr Nowy in Łódź, and was released on a soundtrack for the film Aleja Gówniarzy, which had its premiere in April 2007. In the same year, Przekrój, Onet.pl and Gazeta Wyborcza hailed L.Stadt the hope of Polish alternative music. A well-known radio DJ form Trójka, Piotr Stelmach, put the band's song "Gore" on a compilation album OFFensywa, which was released by Polskie Radio. L.Stadt's music also found its way to other compilations, like Program Alternatywny, FDM, Lista Przebojów Programu 3-go.

The band's debut album titled L.Stadt was released on 29 February 2008 through EMI and received positive reviews.

In the next two years following the release of the album, the band played over 200 concerts in clubs and at festivals, in Poland and abroad, including PKO BP London Live at Wembley Arena, Open'er Festival, Wrocław Non Stop, Bremen Viertel Fest and B2gheter Festival in Lithuania. In 2009, the song "Londyn" (the only song from the album recorded in Polish) charted at several radio stations and was nominated in the category The Best Rock Hit of Year 2009 at Eska Music Awards. L.Stadt was also one of the ambassadors representing the city Łódź in its fight for the title of European Capital of Culture 2016.

=== Concerts in the U.S. and EL.P (2010–11) ===
In March 2010, L.Stadt was invited to one of the biggest music festivals in the U.S., South by Southwest in Austin. During that time the band played 13 times, having its first concert tour in Texas (Austin, Houston, Dallas, Ft. Worth). In the summer, L.Stadt performed at some of the most important Polish festivals, including Open'er Festival and Coke Live Music Festival.

In autumn 2010, L.Stadt was invited to the first edition of Filter Magazine's Culture Collide Festival in Los Angeles, where they shared stage with White Lies, among others. The band also participated in Indie Week Canada in Toronto, where it got to the finals, as one of the top 10 bands. After the finals, The Indie Machine wrote, "Poland's L.Stadt don't mess around when it comes to bringing the rock... they bring a city worth of it when they hit the stage."

On 6 December 2010, L.Stadt released its second album, EL.P, through Polish label Mystic Production. The record was mixed and mastered by Mikael "Count" Eldridge, known for his work with DJ Shadow, Radiohead and No Doubt. The album received positive reviews.

In March 2011, the band performed at SXSW for the second time. Max Blau of Paste magazine wrote, "Polish vintage rockers mix in blues-rock with a hint of rockabilly. Jon Spencer meets Chuck Berry."

=== You Gotta Move (2012–present) ===
In 2012, it was reported that the band was working on the release of You Gotta Move, a record containing covers of country songs, recorded in Texas. Two songs off the record, "UFO" (originally by Jim Sullivan) and folk standard "Come Away Melinda" (written by Fred Hellerman and Frank Minoff), charted on Lista Przebojów Programu Trzeciego in 2012. You Gotta Move was eventually released on 2 October 2013 through Mystic Production.

== Band members ==
Current members

- Łukasz Lach – vocals, guitar, piano (2003–present)
- Adam Lewartowski – bass guitar, scratching (2003–present)
- Piotr Gwadera – drums (2010–present)
- Andrzej Sieczkowski – percussion (2003–present)

Former members

- Radek Bolewski – drums (2003–2010)

== Discography ==
=== Albums ===
Title	Album details
L.Stadt	Released: 29 February 2008; Label: EventMusic / EMI; Format: CD, digital download
EL.P	Released: 6 December 2010; Label: Mystic Production; Format: CD, digital download

=== Extended plays ===
Title	Album details
You Gotta Move	Released: 2 October 2013; Label: Mystic Production; Format: CD, LP, digital download

=== Charted songs ===
Title	Year	Peak chart positions	Album
Title	Year	LP3	Album
"Londyn"	2008	32	L.Stadt
"Ciggies"	2009	31	L.Stadt
"Death of a Surfer Girl"	2009	39	EL.P
"UFO"	2012	26	You Gotta Move
"Come Away Melinda"	2012	15	You Gotta Move

=== Music videos ===
Year	Song	Album	Director(s)	Source
2006	"Fagot Eyes"	L.Stadt	Zosia Mikucka	
2008	"March"	L.Stadt	Rafał Masłow	
2010	"Death of a Surfer Girl"	EL.P	Marcel Sawicki	
2011	"Fashion Freak"	EL.P		
2011	"Smooth"	EL.P	Kasia Sawicka	
