= Novika =

Polish vocalist, DJ, and producer (born 1974)

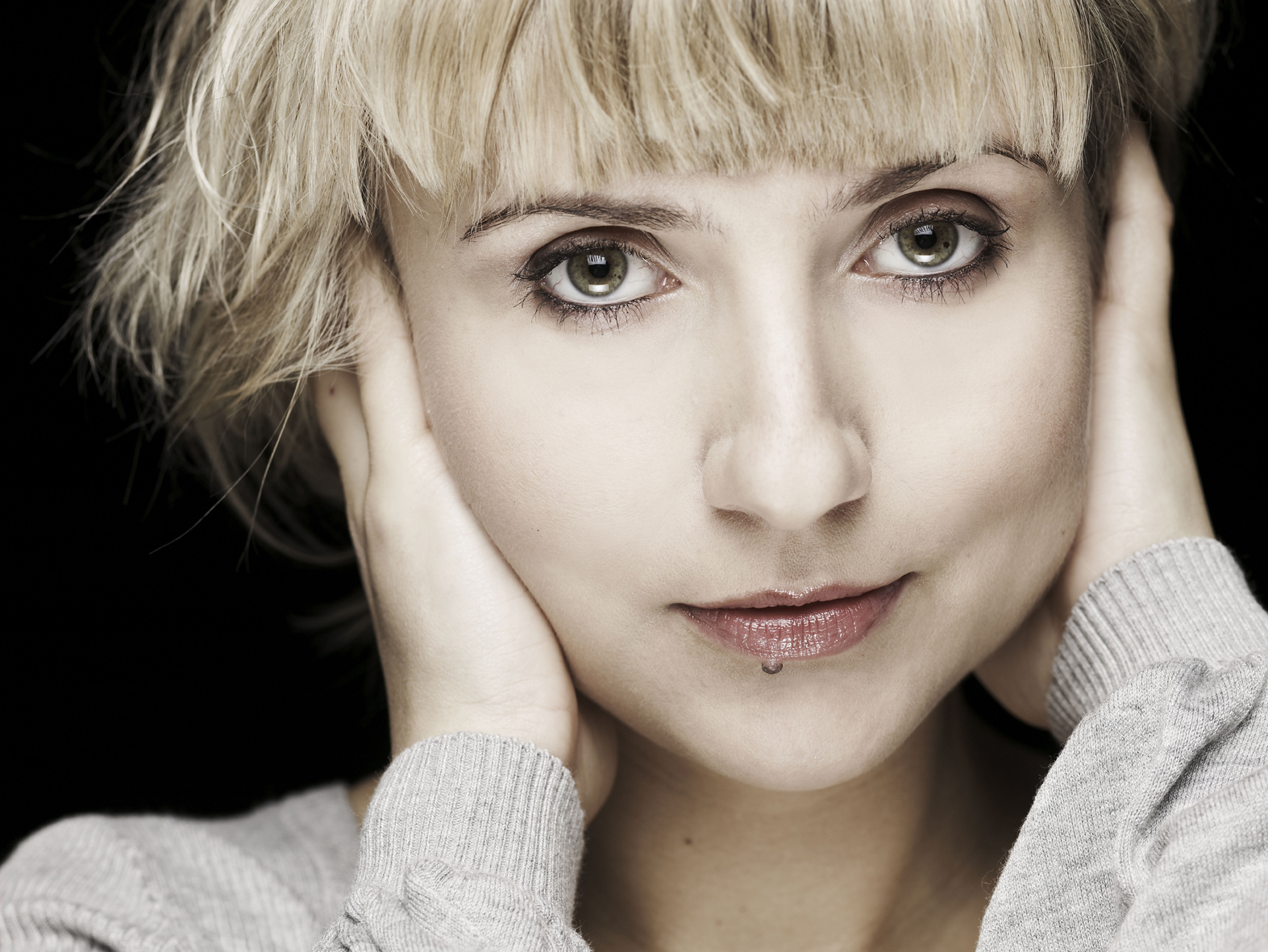
- Novika in 2008

Background information
- Also known as: Novika
- Born: Katarzyna Nowicka; 1974 (age 50–51)
- Origin: Poland
- Genres: Electro music, deep house, techno
- Labels: Beats Friendly, Kayax
- Website: http://www.novika.pl

Novika (born Katarzyna Nowicka; born 1974) is a Polish vocalist, DJ, and producer. She plays a blend of electro music, deep house, deep techno, and dubtronica.

She is known for her numerous collaborations with Futro, Smolik, Fisz, Vienio & Pele, Adamus and others, all of whom appeared on her album "Feat. Novika" (Sissy, 2004). In Radiostacja she hosted her show "Radio Lazy Sunday" for 5 years. Then she moved to Jazz Radio for a while and ended up in national radio for young people - BIS. Here she serves lazy and experimental electronic sounds and presents new local talents. She supports Polish artists and DJs also through compilations (Radio Leniwa Niedziela, Sissy 2002; Polskie Leniwe, Kayax 2005).

Novika has founded a DJ collective and record label called Beats Friendly.

She has performed at major Polish festivals (Astigmatic, Heineken Open'er, Era New Horizons), in Paris (Closing of Polish Year in France) and Japan (Expo).

== Discography ==
| Title | Album details | Peak chart positions |
| Title | Album details | POL |
|---|---|---|
| feat. Novika | Released: March 29, 2004; Label: BMG; Formats: CD, digital download | 11 |
| Finally (EP) | Released: February 20, 2006; Label: Beats Friendly Records; Formats: CD | — |
| Tricks of Life | Released: October 30, 2006; Label: Kayax/EMI Music Poland; Formats: CD, digital download | 24 |
| Lovefinder | Released: January 22, 2010; Label: Kayax/EMI Music Poland; Formats: CD, digital download | 6 |
| Mixfinder | Released: June 14, 2011; Label: Kayax/EMI Music Poland; Formats: CD, digital download | — |
| Heart Times | Released: April 2, 2013; Label: MMA rec; Formats: CD, digital download | — |
"—" denotes a recording that did not chart or was not released in that territory.
