= Kim Nowak =

Polish rock band

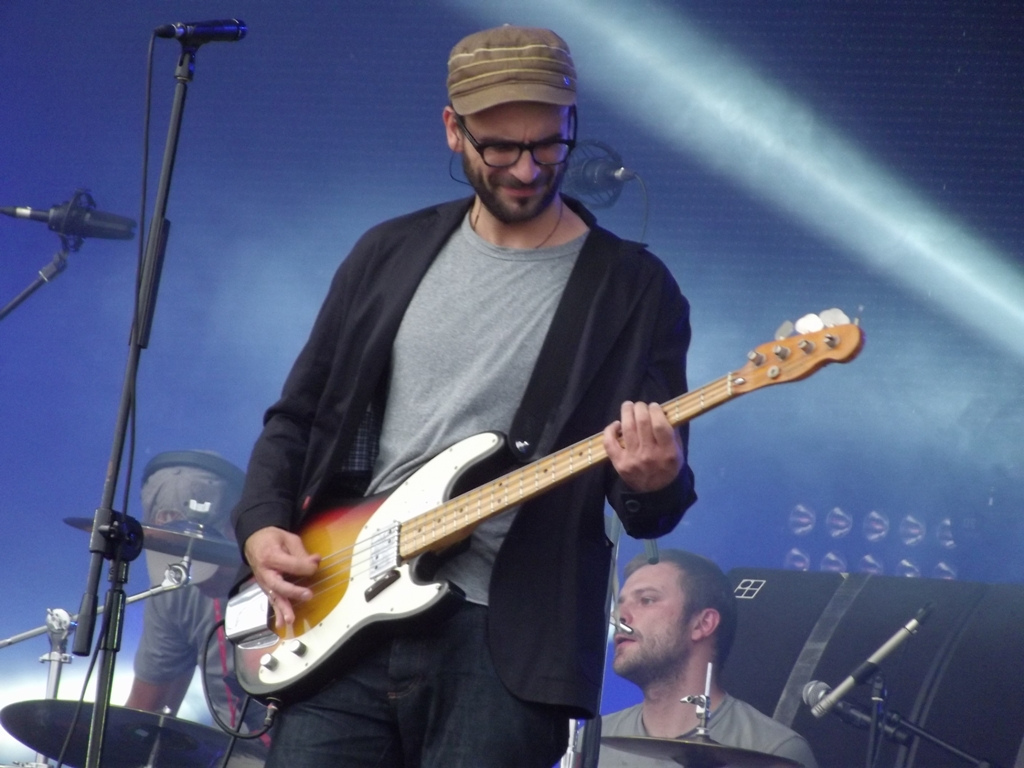
- Kim Nowak at Coke Live Music Festival, 2012

Background information
- Origin: Warsaw, Poland
- Genres: Rock
- Years active: 2008–present
- Label: Universal Music Poland
- Members: Bartosz Waglewski; Piotr Waglewski; Michał Sobolewski
- Website: http://kimnowak.pl/

Kim Nowak is a Polish rock band. It was founded in 2008 by hip-hop artist Bartosz "Fisz" Waglewski, producer Piotr "Emade" Waglewski and Michał Sobolewski.

The band name is a Polish spelling variant of the name of American actress Kim Novak. In an interview with Newsweek, Piotr Waglewski said the band's intention was to refer to the 1960s.

== History ==
=== Kim Nowak (2008–2011) ===
As Waglewski brothers had been present on the Polish hip-hop music scene for over a decade, they started Kim Nowak in 2008 as a side-project to "fulfill their boyhood dreams of playing this kind of music" and to "pay tribute to groups like Fugazi or Black Keys".

Their debut album, titled Kim Nowak, was recorded in August 2009 and released on 14 May 2010 through Universal Music Poland. The single promoting the album, titled "Szczur" ("Rat"), was accompanied by a music video directed by Tomasza Nalewajek and Marcin Nowak. The album was nominated for the Polish music award Fryderyk in the Rock Album of the Year category.

On 28 August 2010, the band played at Orange Warsaw Festival. On 2 July 2011, Kim Nowak performed at the Tent Stage at Open'er Festival, alongside artists like Kate Nash, Chapel Club and The Asteroids Galaxy Tour.

=== Wilk (2011–present) ===
Kim Nowak released their second studio album, Wilk (Wolf), on 6 November 2012 through Universal Music Poland. Although the band didn't stop searching for inspiration in the rock music of the 1960s, Wilk represents a different music direction than their debut album: garage sounds and screams made more room for compositions with a calm and dark climate, sometimes resembling a soundtrack for a David Lynch or Tarantino film. The album featured guest appearances by Izabela Skrybant Dziewiątkowska of Tercet Egzotyczny and Tomek Duda of Pink Freud. All songs were composed by Kim Nowak, lyrics were written by Bartosz Waglewski and the album was produced by Piotr Waglewski.

In 2012, the band performed at Coke Live Music Festival in Kraków. On 4 July 2013, they played as one of the supports for Arctic Monkeys at the main stage at Open'er Festival in Gdynia.

== Musical style ==
In an official press statement prior to the release of the debut album Kim Nowak, the band wrote:

The name refers to the 1960s, longing for recording albums live, without production "fireworks". Waglewski brothers, fascinated with hip-hop, were coming back (what's characteristic of the 1990s) to bands with roots in punk and garage music – Bad Brains, Fugazi, Sonic Youth or Morphine. Waglewski's first bands were [playing] punk music. Although they often let their fascinations out, for example on the concerts of their project Tworzywo Sztuczne, it wasn't until recently that they've found a guitarist with similar sentiments and longings. Michał Sobolewski is a connoisseur of the 1960s music, fascinated with dirty, strong sound of guitars on records by Jimi Hendrix, Black Sabbath, Ten Years After, or less known Toad and 13th Floor Elevators.

== Band members ==
- Bartosz Waglewski – lead vocals (2008–present), bass guitar (2008–2012), rhythm guitar (2023)
- Piotr Waglewski – drums, backing vocals (2008–present)
- Michał Sobolewski – lead guitar, backing vocals(2008–present)
- Staszek Wróbel – bass guitar (2023)

== Discography ==
=== Albums ===
Title	Album details	Peak chart positions
Title	Album details	POL
Kim Nowak	Released: 14 May 2010; Label: Universal Music Poland	8
Wilk	Released: 6 November 2012; Label: Universal Music Poland	14

== Awards and nominations ==
=== Fryderyk ===
Year	Nominee / work	Award	Result
2011	Kim Nowak	Album of the Year – Rock	Nominated
