= Emade =

Polish hip-hop producer

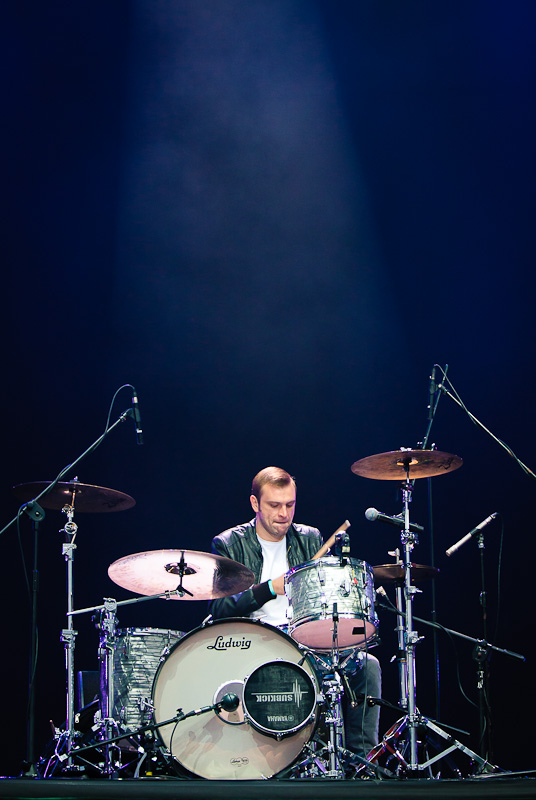
- Emade performing as part of Kim Nowak in 2010
- Born: Piotr Waglewski; December 15, 1981 (age 43); Warsaw, Poland
- Occupation(s): Record producer, musician, DJ
- Parent(s): Wojciech Waglewski; Grażyna Waglewska
- Relatives: Bartosz "Fisz" Waglewski (brother)
- Musical career
- Also known as: Emade, DJ M.A.D.
- Genres: Hip-hop, alternative rock, rock, jazz-hop, alternative hip-hop, jazz, electronic, downtempo, funk
- Instrument(s): Guitar, piano, percussion, harp
- Years active: 1999 – present
- Labels: Asfalt Records, Agora SA, Art2 Music

Emade (real name Piotr Waglewski) (born December 15, 1981) is a Polish hip-hop producer, brother of rapper Fisz and son of the Polish musician Wojciech Waglewski, lead vocalist of Voo Voo.

He started out playing percussion at the age of 13 in his own hardcore formation. Few years later he formed RHX group with his brother and Inespe and began his career as a hip-hop producer with their debut album release in 1999. At 20th Przegląd Piosenki Aktorskiej in Wrocław, Poland he accompanied Nick Cave & The Bad Seeds.

In 2001 he produced Inespe's solo debut album Ocean Szarych Bloków. He remixed Smolik's "Who told you" and WWO's "Bezsenne noce" in 2003. The same year his Album producencki was released.

In 2004 he collaborated with his brother on Maria Peszek's album miasto mania. Next year POE's (Projekt Ostry Emade) album Szum rodzi hałas been released.

Emade is the drummer of Polish rock band Kim Nowak, which he founded together with his brother Fisz and Michał Sobolewski in 2008. The band released two studio albums, Kim Nowak (2010) and Wilk (2012).

== Discography ==
=== Albums ===
Title	Album details	Peak chart positions	Sales	Certifications
Title	Album details	POL	Sales	Certifications
Album producencki	Released: December 12, 2003; Label: Asfalt Records; Formats: CD	—		
Piątek 13 (with Fisz)	Released: October 13, 2006; Label: Asfalt Records; Formats: CD	8		
Męska muzyka (with Wojciech Waglewski and Fisz)	Released: February 1, 2008; Label: Agora SA; Formats: CD, digital download	—	POL: 30,000+	POL: Platinum
Heavi Metal (with Fisz)	Released: November 21, 2008; Label: Asfalt Records; Formats: CD	18	POL: 6,000+	
Zwierzę bez nogi (with Fisz)	Released: November 21, 2011; Label: Agora SA; Formats: CD, digital download	—		
Matka, Syn, Bóg (with Wojciech Waglewski and Fisz)	Released: October 25, 2013; Label: Art2 Music; Formats: CD, digital download	—	POL: 15,000+	POL: Gold
Drony (with Fisz)	Released: October 21, 2016; Label: Agora SA			
"—" denotes a recording that did not chart or was not released in that territory.

=== Video albums ===
Title	Video details
Męska muzyka. Koncert w Fabryce Trzciny (with Wojciech Waglewski and Fisz)	Released: December 17, 2008; Label: Agora SA; Formats: DVD
