= Kasia Nosowska =

Polish singer-songwriter

Katarzyna Nosowska
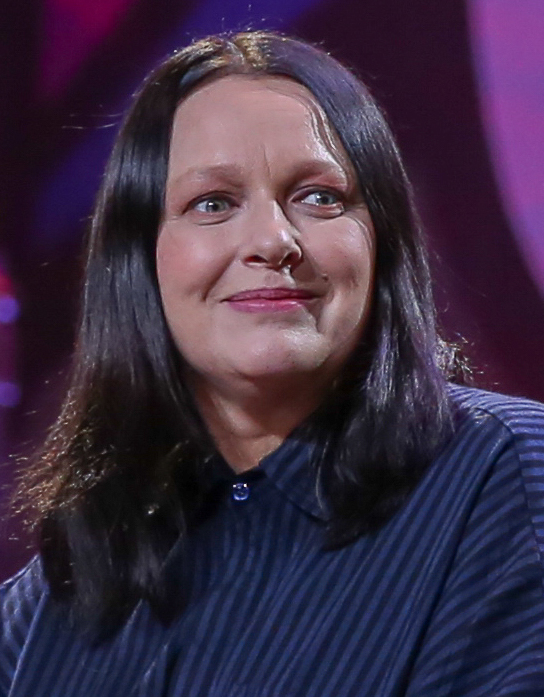
- Born: 30 August 1971 (age 54); Szczecin, Poland
- Occupations: Singer, songwriter, columnist
- Musical career
- Genres: Alternative rock, rock, electronic
- Years active: 1989–present
- Labels: PolyGram Poland, Universal Music Poland, QL Music, Supersam Music, Kayax
- Website: nosowska.pl

Signature
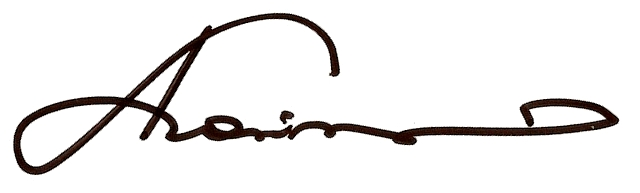

Katarzyna "Kasia" Nosowska (born 30 August 1971, Szczecin) is the lead singer of the Polish rock band Hey. She is also known for her solo career, which in contrast to Hey's guitar-driven rock delves more into electronica. Apart from penning Hey's lyrics, she is also a columnist in several Polish magazines.

She received many awards and holds the record for the largest number of Fryderyk awards, including multiple wins in categories Author of the Year and Female Vocalist of the Year. In 2012 and 2013, she was the art director of concert tour Męskie Granie.

== Discography ==
=== Solo albums ===
Title	Album details	Peak chart positions	Certifications
Title	Album details	POL	Certifications
puk.puk	Released: 16 September 1996; Label: PolyGram Poland	—	POL: Gold
Milena	Released: 8 March 1998; Label: PolyGram Poland	—	
Sushi	Released: 15 May 2000; Label: Universal Music	—	
UniSexBlues	Released: 28 May 2007; Label: QL Music	1	POL: Gold
Osiecka	Released: 28 November 2008; Label: QL Music; Album with songs written by Agnieszka Osiecka	1	POL: 2× Platinum
8	Released: 23 September 2011; Label: Supersam Music	1	POL: Platinum
Basta	Released: 12 October 2018; Label: Kayax	1	POL: Gold
"—" denotes a recording that did not chart.

== Awards and nominations ==
=== Fryderyk ===
Fryderyk awards received by Kasia Nosowska and her band Hey

Year	Recipient	Award	Result
1994	Hey	Group of the Year	Won
1994	Hey in Spodek, Katowice	Concert of the Year	Won
1994	Katarzyna Nosowska	Female Vocalist of the Year	Nominated
1994	Ho!	Album of the Year – Rock/Pop	Nominated
1994	Hey concert tour	Event of the Year	Nominated
1995	Katarzyna Nosowska	Author of the Year	Nominated
1995	Hey	Group of the Year	Nominated
1995	?	Album of the Year – Rock	Nominated
1996	Katarzyna Nosowska	Author of the Year	Won
1996	puk.puk	Album of the Year – Alternative	Won
1996	puk.puk	Album of the Year – Rock	Nominated
1996	Katarzyna Nosowska	Female Vocalist of the Year	Nominated
1998	Katarzyna Nosowska	Female Vocalist of the Year	Nominated
1998	Milena	Album of the Year – Alternative	Nominated
1999	Katarzyna Nosowska	Female Vocalist of the Year	Nominated
1999	Hey	Album of the Year – Rock	Nominated
2000	Sushi	Album of the Year – Alternative	Won
2000	Katarzyna Nosowska	Author of the Year	Won
2000	Katarzyna Nosowska	Female Vocalist of the Year	Nominated
2001	[sic!]	Album of the Year – Rock	Won
2001	Hey – "Cisza, ja i czas"	Song of the Year	Nominated
2001	Katarzyna Nosowska	Author of the Year	Nominated
2001	Katarzyna Nosowska	Female Vocalist of the Year	Nominated
2001	Hey	Group of the Year	Nominated
2002	Katarzyna Nosowska	Author of the Year	Nominated
2002	Katarzyna Nosowska	Female Vocalist of the Year	Nominated
2003	Music Music	Album of the Year – Rock	Won
2003	Koncertowy	Album of the Year – Rock	Nominated
2003	Paweł Krawczyk and Leszek Kamiński (for the song "Muka!" by Hey)	Best Music Production	Nominated
2003	Katarzyna Nosowska	Author of the Year	Nominated
2003	Katarzyna Nosowska	Female Vocalist of the Year	Nominated
2003	Hey	Group of the Year	Nominated
2005	Katarzyna Nosowska	Author of the Year	Won
2005	Katarzyna Nosowska	Female Vocalist of the Year	Won
2005	Hey	Group of the Year	Won
2005	Echosystem	Best Album Design	Won
2005	Echosystem	Album of the Year – Rock/Metal	Won
2005	Hey – "Mimo wszystko"	Video of the Year	Nominated
2005	Hey – "Mimo wszystko"	Song of the Year	Nominated
2006	Katarzyna Nosowska	Author of the Year	Won
2006	Katarzyna Nosowska	Female Vocalist of the Year	Nominated
2008	Marcin Macuk, Leszek Kamiński and Wojtek Łopaciuk (for the album MTV Unplugged)	Best Music Production	Won
2008	Katarzyna Nosowska	Author of the Year	Won
2008	Katarzyna Nosowska	Female Vocalist of the Year	Won
2008	MTV Unplugged	Best Album Design	Won
2008	MTV Unplugged	Album of the Year – Rock/Metal	Won
2008	UniSexBlues	Album of the Year – Alternative	Won
2008	Nosowska – "Era Retuszera"	Song of the Year	Won
2008	Nosowska – "Era Retuszera"	Video of the Year	Won
2008	Marcin Macuk and Marcin Bors (for the song "Era Retuszera" by Nosowska)	Best Music Production	Nominated
2008	Marcin Macuk and Marcin Bors (for the album UniSexBlues)	Best Music Production	Nominated
2008	Katarzyna Nosowska	Composer of the Year	Nominated
2008	UniSexBlues	Best Album Design	Nominated
2008	Hey	Group of the Year	Nominated
2008	Hey – "Sic!"	Song of the Year	Nominated
2009	Osiecka	Album of the Year – Sung Poetry	Won
2009	Katarzyna Nosowska	Female Vocalist of the Year	Won
2009	Osiecka	Best Album Design	Nominated
2009	Nosowska – "Kto tam u ciebie jest?"	Song of the Year	Nominated
2010	Marcin Bors and Paweł Krawczyk (for the album Miłość! Uwaga! Ratunku! Pomocy!)	Best Music Production	Won
2010	Miłość! Uwaga! Ratunku! Pomocy!	Best Album Design	Won
2010	Miłość! Uwaga! Ratunku! Pomocy!	Album of the Year – Rock	Won
2010	Hey	Group of the Year	Won
2010	Hey – "Kto tam? Kto jest w środku?"	Song of the Year	Won
2010	Katarzyna Nosowska	Author of the Year	Won
2010	Katarzyna Nosowska	Female Vocalist of the Year	Nominated
2010	Katarzyna Nosowska and Paweł Krawczyk	Composer of the Year	Nominated
2010	Marcin Bors and Paweł Krawczyk (for the song "Kto tam? Kto jest w środku?" by Hey)	Best Music Production	Nominated
2010	Hey – "Kto tam? Kto jest w środku?"	Video of the Year	Nominated
2012	Katarzyna Nosowska	Author of the Year	Won
2012	8	Best Album Design	Won
2012	8	Album of the Year – Alternative	Nominated
2012	Nosowska – "Nomada"	Song of the Year	Nominated
2012	Katarzyna Nosowska	Female Vocalist of the Year	Nominated
2012	Marcin Bors and Marcin Macuk (for the album 8)	Best Music Production	Nominated
2013	Do Rycerzy, do Szlachty, do Mieszczan	Album of the Year	Nominated
2013	Hey	Artist of the Year	Nominated
