= Fisz =

Polish rap artist (born 1978)

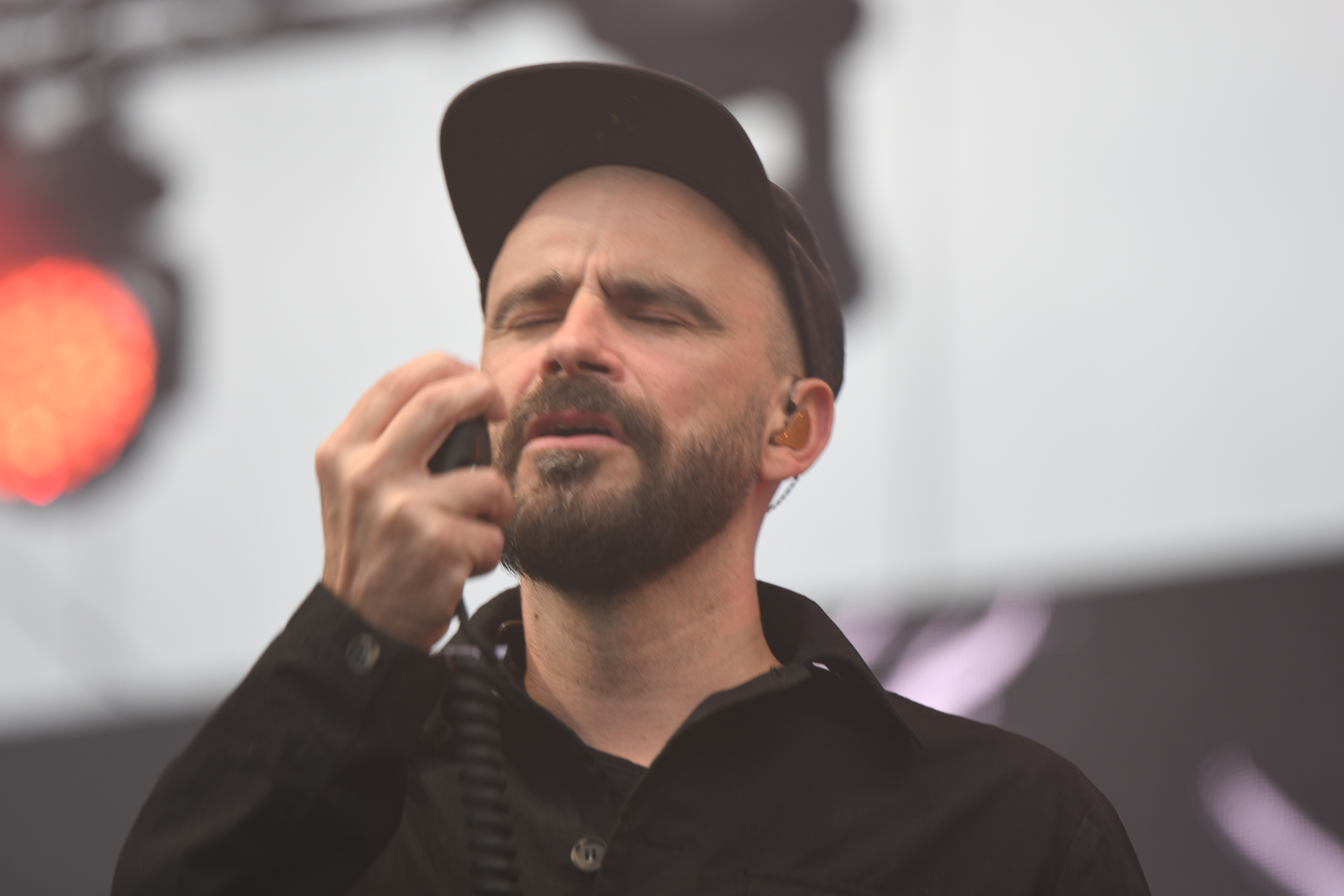
- Fisz performing as part of Tworzywo in 2023
- Born: Bartosz Waglewski; 19 March 1978 (age 48); Warsaw, Poland
- Education: European Academy of Arts in Warsaw
- Occupations: Rapper, singer, musician, record producer, painter, radio personality
- Parent: Wojciech Waglewski (father)
- Relatives: Piotr "Emade" Waglewski (brother)
- Musical career
- Genres: Hip-hop, alternative rock, rock, jazz hop, alternative hip-hop, jazz, electronic, downtempo, funk
- Instruments: Vocals, bass guitar, guitar
- Labels: Asfalt Records, Agora SA, Art2 Music

Fisz (born Bartosz Waglewski 19 March 1978) is a Polish rap artist.

The musical style of Fisz is unconventional. At the very beginning of his career he started out as a hip-hop artist, but went experimental soon after releasing Tworzywo Sztuczne – Wielki Ciężki Słoń in 2004. Fisz and his brother and producer Emade seek inspiration in black music giving soul, funk and jazz touch to their projects. His lyrics are often based on wordplay.

== Biography ==
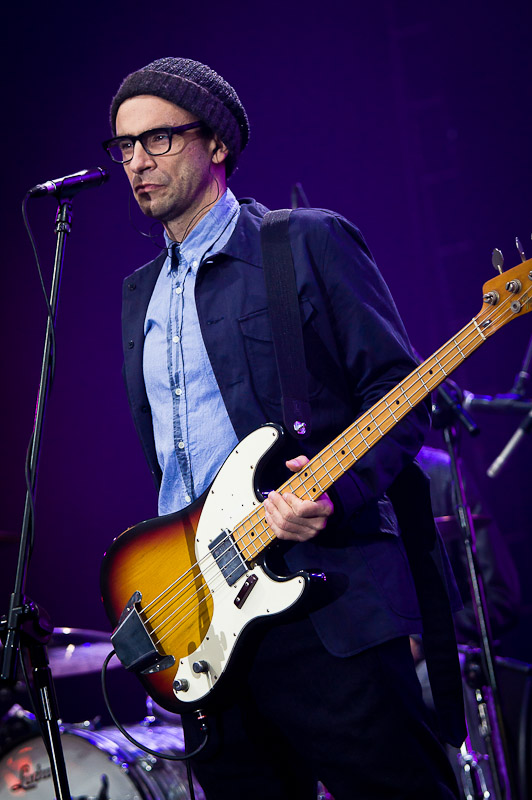
Fisz, 2010

Bartosz Waglewski was born on 19 March 1978 in Warsaw, Poland. He is the son of musician Wojciech Waglewski and older brother of Emade (Piotr Waglewski). He studied at Europejska Akademia Sztuk (EAS).

In 2008, he founded a rock band Kim Nowak together with his brother Emade and Michał Sobolewski. The band released two studio albums, Kim Nowak (2010) and Wilk (2012).

Internationally he gave concerts on stages of London, Berlin, Bordeaux, Calvi, Dijon, Marseille, Vienna, Budapest, Prague, Paris and Saint Vallier.

== Discography ==
=== Solo albums ===
Title	Album details	Peak chart positions	Sales
Title	Album details	POL	Sales
Polepione dźwięki	Released: 26 June 2000; Label: Asfalt Records; Formats: CD	48	
Na wylot	Released: 24 September 2001; Label: Asfalt Records; Formats: CD	4	POL: 15,000+
"—" denotes a recording that did not chart or was not released in that territory.

=== Collaborative albums ===
Title	Album details	Peak chart positions	Sales	Certifications
Title	Album details	POL	Sales	Certifications
Fru! (with Envee)	Released: 25 April 2005; Label: Asfalt Records; Formats: CD	4	POL: 5,000+	
Piątek 13 (with Emade)	Released: 13 October 2006; Label: Asfalt Records; Formats: CD	8		
Męska muzyka (with Wojciech Waglewski and Emade)	Released: 1 February 2008; Label: Agora SA; Formats: CD, digital download	—	POL: 30,000+	POL: Platinum
Heavi Metal (with Emade)	Released: 21 November 2008; Label: Asfalt Records; Formats: CD	18	POL: 6,000+	
Zwierzę bez nogi (with Emade)	Released: 21 November 2011; Label: Agora SA; Formats: CD, digital download	—		
Matka, Syn, Bóg (with Wojciech Waglewski and Emade)	Released: 25 October 2013; Label: Art2 Music; Formats: CD, digital download	—	POL: 15,000+	POL: Gold
Drony (with Emade)	Released: 21 October 2016; Label: Agora SA			
"—" denotes a recording that did not chart or was not released in that territory.

=== Video albums ===
Title	Video details
Męska muzyka. Koncert w Fabryce Trzciny (with Wojciech Waglewski and Emade)	Released: 17 December 2008; Label: Agora SA; Formats: DVD

=== Music videos ===
Year	Title	Directed	Album	Ref.
2000	"Polepiony"	—	Polepione dźwięki	
2001	"Tajemnica" (featuring Novika)	Tomasz Nalewajek, Fisz	Na wylot	
2005	"Kryminalny bluez" (with Envee)	Sebastian Pańczyk	Fru!	
2006	"Kręcioł" (with Envee)	Sebastian Pańczyk, Adam Wyrwas	Fru!	
2006	"Nie bo nie" (with Emade)	Maciej Olbrycht	Piątek 13	
2009	"Heavi metal" (with Emade)	Wojtek Zieliński	Heavi metal	
2011	"Zwierzę bez nogi" (with Emade)	Tymon Tykwiński, Jakub Drobczyński	Zwierzę bez nogi	

== Awards ==
Fisz has been nominated to Fryderyk Award eight times.

In 2000 he received two nominations in the categories New Face of Fonography (debiut roku) and Album of the Year – Hip-Hop/Rap (Album Roku Rap/Hip hop) "Polepione dźwięki". A year later, in 2001, he received another nomination in the same category for "Na wylot". In 2003 Fisz, together with Emade, was nominated as Tworzywo Sztuczne in the category Club Album of the Year for "F3". They were also nominated for the Alternative Album of The Year (Album Roku Muzyka Alternatywna) the following year ("Wielki Ciężki Słoń"). In 2005 "Fru!" was nominated in the same category. 2006 brought two more nominations for the Hip hop/R&B Album of The Year ("Piątek 13-nastego") and the Group of the Year (together with Emade).

In addition he has won or has been nominated for the following awards:

- the 2000 Machiner Award for "Polepione dźwięki" in the category Niche Album
- the Album of The Year from the Fluid magazine for "Polepione dźwięki"
- Paszport Polityki for "Polepione dźwięki" (nomination)
- the Most Important Polish Performer in 2001 and the Polish Video of the Year for "Tajemnica" from the magazine Klan
- Przekrój magazine Fenomen Award 2005
- Paszport Polityki in the category Pop-Rock-Scene ("Piątek 13")
