= Open'er Festival =

Music festival in Poland

Coordinates: 54.5794°N 18.5298°E

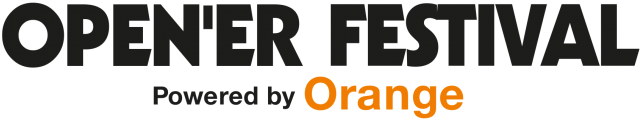
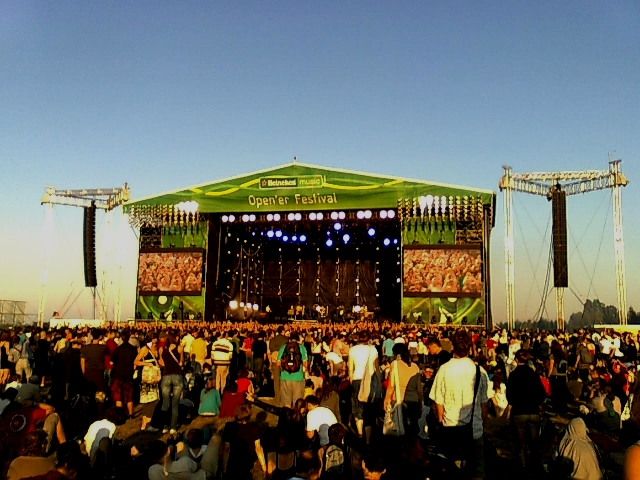
- Genre: Rock, pop, alternative, indie rock, dance, electronic, world
- Dates: End of June / first week of July, Wednesday–Saturday (4 days)
- Locations: Gdynia, Poland
- Years active: 2002–present
- Founders: Alter Art
- Website: www.opener.pl

The Open'er Festival is a music festival which takes place on the north coast of Poland, in Gdynia. It is one of the biggest annual music festivals in Poland. The first edition of the festival was organized in Warsaw in 2002 as Open Air Festival. Open’er Festival won the Best Major Festival prize at the European Festivals Awards ceremony in 2009, 2010, 2019, and 2024.

== History ==
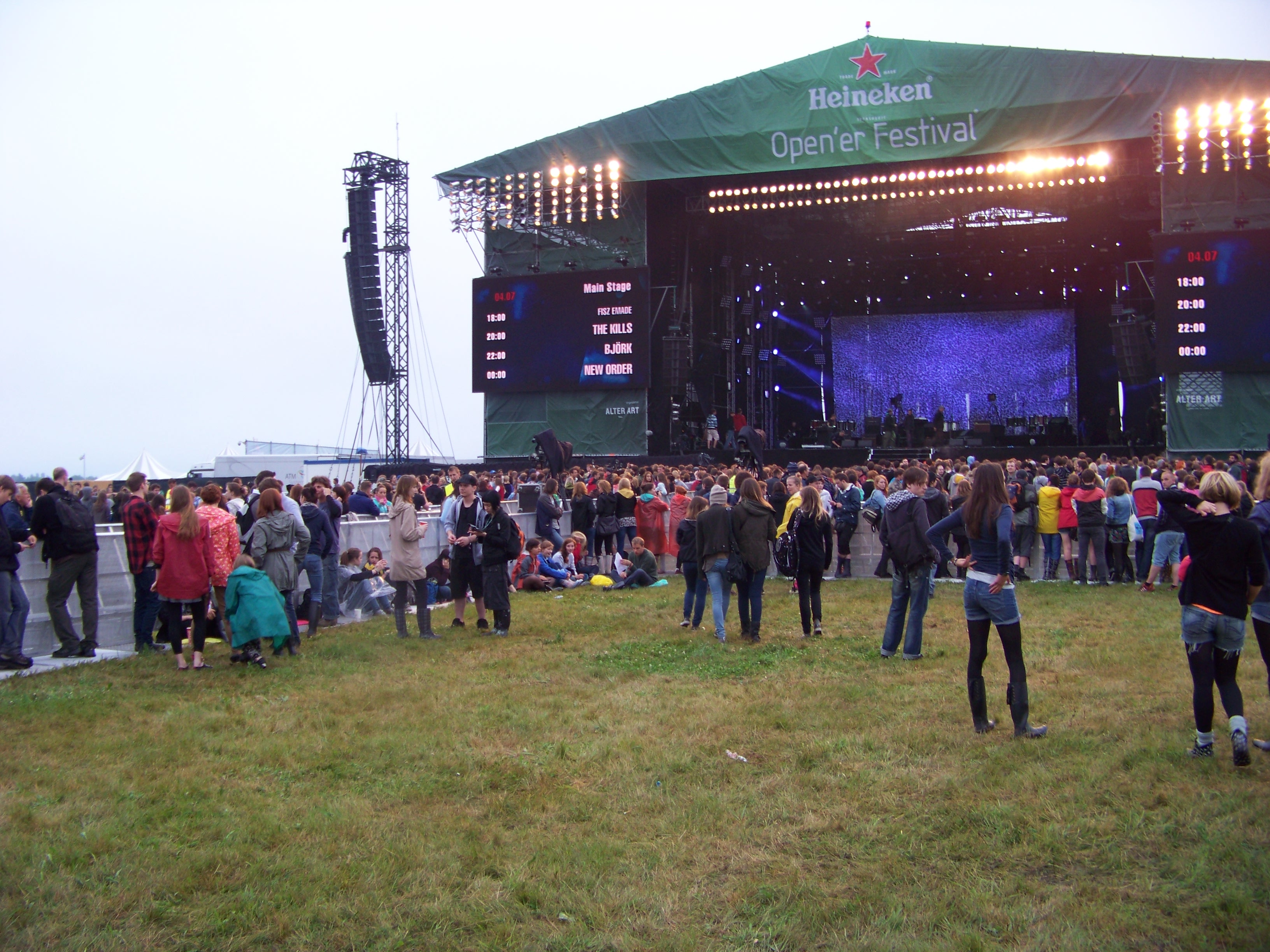
Open'er Festival (2012)

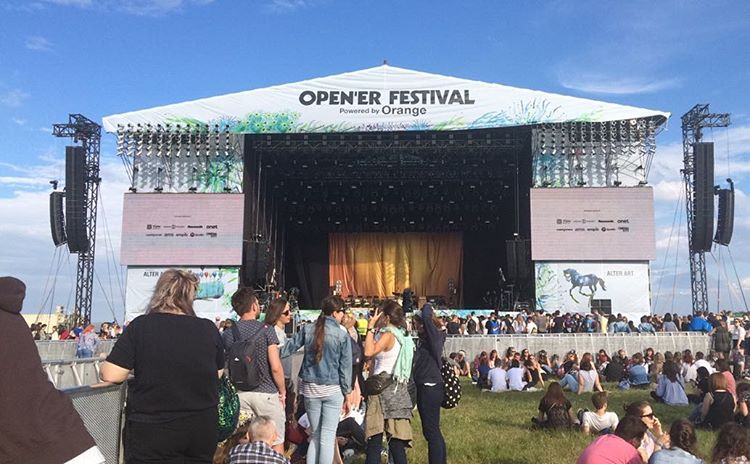
Open'er Festival main stage in 2016

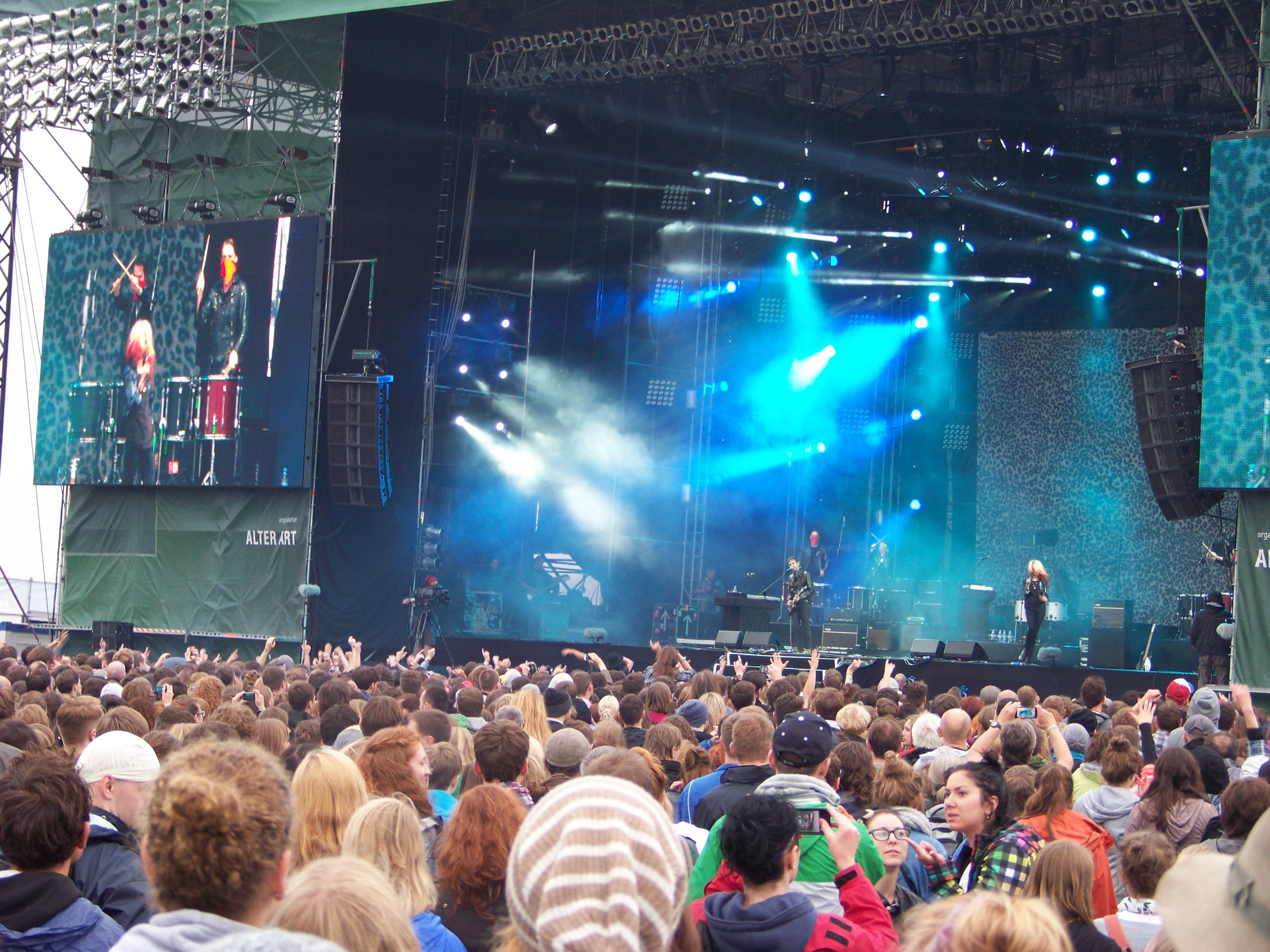
One of the concerts at Open'er Festival in 2012

The first Open Air Festival was held in Tor Stegny in Warsaw in 2002, with The Chemical Brothers playing on the main stage. The festival then took place in Kościuszki Square in Gdynia from 2003 to 2005. The last festival in Kościuszki Square attracted over 50,000 people. Since 2006, the festival has taken place in Kosakowo Airport (Babie Doły Military Airport) in Gdynia.

=== Timeline ===
Edition	Year	Dates	Venue	Headliners
1st	2002	2 July	Tor Stegny, Warsaw	The Chemical Brothers
2nd	2003	26 July	Kościuszki Square, Gdynia	No headliners
3rd	2004	2–3 July	Kościuszki Square, Gdynia	P!nk; Cypress Hill; Massive Attack; Goldfrapp
4th	2005	8–9 July	Kościuszki Square, Gdynia	Snoop Dogg; Fatboy Slim; Faithless; The White Stripes; Lauryn Hill; Underworld
5th	2006	6–8 July	Babie Doły Military Airport, Gdynia	Placebo; Pharrell Williams; Manu Chao; Franz Ferdinand; Sigur Rós; Scissor Sisters; Skin; Kanye West; Basement Jaxx; The Streets
6th	2007	29 June–1 July	Babie Doły Military Airport, Gdynia	Björk; Beastie Boys; Muse
7th	2008	4–6 July	Babie Doły Military Airport, Gdynia	Massive Attack; The Chemical Brothers; Jay-Z; Interpol
8th	2009	2–5 July	Babie Doły Military Airport, Gdynia	Kings of Leon; Arctic Monkeys; Placebo; The Prodigy; Faith No More
9th	2010	1–4 July	Babie Doły Military Airport, Gdynia	Pearl Jam; Kasabian; Massive Attack; The Dead Weather
10th	2011	30 June–3 July	Babie Doły Military Airport, Gdynia	Coldplay; Prince; The Strokes; Pulp; M.I.A.
11th	2012	4–7 July	Babie Doły Military Airport, Gdynia	Björk; Justice; Franz Ferdinand; The Mars Volta
12th	2013	3–6 July	Babie Doły Military Airport, Gdynia	Kings of Leon; Queens of the Stone Age; Arctic Monkeys; Blur
13th	2014	2–5 July	Babie Doły Military Airport, Gdynia	The Black Keys; Pearl Jam; Jack White; Faith No More
14th	2015	1–4 July	Babie Doły Military Airport, Gdynia	Drake; The Libertines; Mumford & Sons; Kasabian
15th	2016	29 June–2 July	Babie Doły Military Airport, Gdynia	Florence and the Machine; Red Hot Chili Peppers; LCD Soundsystem; Sigur Rós; Pharrell Williams; Kygo
16th	2017	28 June–1 July	Babie Doły Military Airport, Gdynia	Radiohead; Foo Fighters; The Weeknd; The xx; Lorde
17th	2018	4–7 July	Babie Doły Military Airport, Gdynia	Arctic Monkeys; Depeche Mode; Gorillaz; Bruno Mars
18th	2019	3–6 July	Babie Doły Military Airport, Gdynia	Travis Scott; The Strokes; The Smashing Pumpkins; Kylie Minogue; Lana Del Rey; Swedish House Mafia
19th	2022	29 June-2 July	Babie Doły Military Airport, Gdynia	Dua Lipa; Twenty One Pilots; Imagine Dragons; A$AP Rocky; The Killers
20th	2023	28 June-1 July	Babie Doły Military Airport, Gdynia	Lizzo; Lil Nas X; SZA; Arctic Monkeys; Kendrick Lamar
21st	2024	3–6 July	Babie Doły Military Airport, Gdynia	Dua Lipa; Foo Fighters; Doja Cat; Hozier
22nd	2025	2-5 July	Babie Doły Military Airport, Gdynia	Linkin Park; Muse; Future; Nine Inch Nails; Massive Attack; Gracie Abrams
23rd	2026	1-4 July	Babie Doły Military Airport, Gdynia	Florence and The Machine; The xx; Nick Cave and The Bad Seeds; Calvin Harris; The Cure; Jennie

== Organization ==
The main organizer of the festival is the concert agency Alter Art. In 2016, there were 5 stages: Orange Main, Alter, Beat, Firestone and Tent. There are also other smaller stages run by sponsors and vendors. Artists also performed in the Silent Disco Area and at the seaside of Gdynia on Gdynia Open Stage, where events are free to attend.
