= The Voice of Poland season 9 =

The Voice of Poland
- Season 9
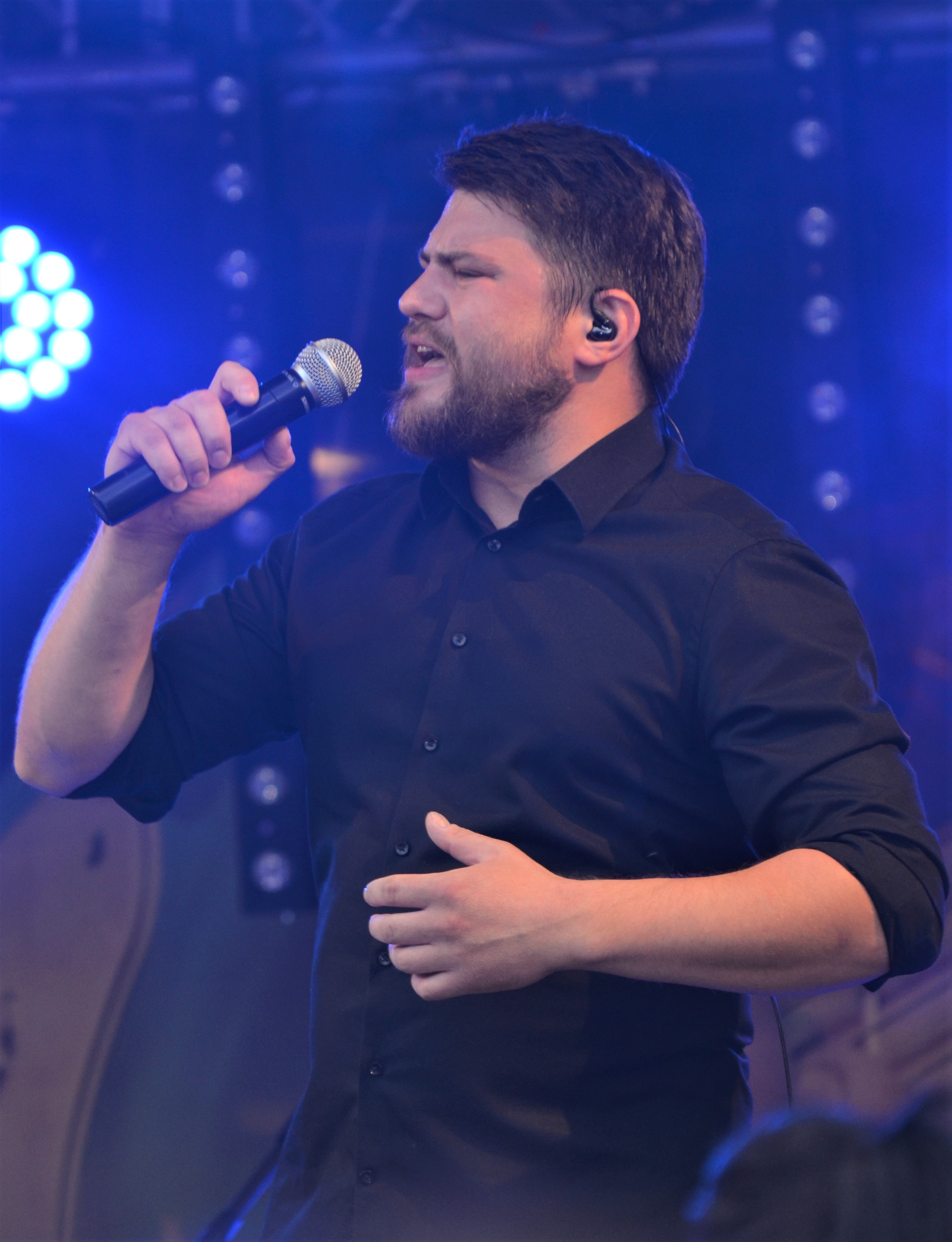
- Hosted by: Tomasz Kammel; Barbara Kurdej–Szatan; Maciej Musiał
- Judges: Michał Szpak; Patrycja Markowska; Grzegorz Hyży; Piotr Cugowski
- Winner: Marcin Sójka
- Winning coach: Patrycja Markowska
- Runner-up: Natalia Zastępa

Release
- Original network: TVP2
- Original release: September 1 – December 1, 2018

Season chronology
- ← Previous; Season 8 Next → Season 10

The ninth season of The Voice of Poland began airing on 1 September 2018, on TVP 2. It aired on Saturdays at 20:05 and 21:10.

Michał Szpak remained as coach this season, but Tomson & Baron, Maria Sadowska, and Andrzej Piaseczny resigned from the function of coaches, and their place was taken by Patrycja Markowska, who previously coached in the second edition. Debutants Grzegorz Hyży and Piotr Cugowski joined as first time coaches. This is also the second season since the inaugural season not to feature any duo coaches.

== Coaches and Hosts ==
Last season's winning coach Michał Szpak is the only returning coach this season. Tomson and Baron, Maria Sadowska, and Andrzej Piaseczny resigned from the coaches' functions, and their places were taken over by: Patrycja Markowska, who previously acted as a trainer in the second season of the program. On the other hand, Grzegorz Hyży and Piotr Cugowski debuted in the role of jurors. The hosts remained unchanged: Tomasz Kammel, Maciej Musiał, Krzysztof "Jankes" Jankowski and Barabara Kurdej-Szatan.

Coaches and Hosts gallery

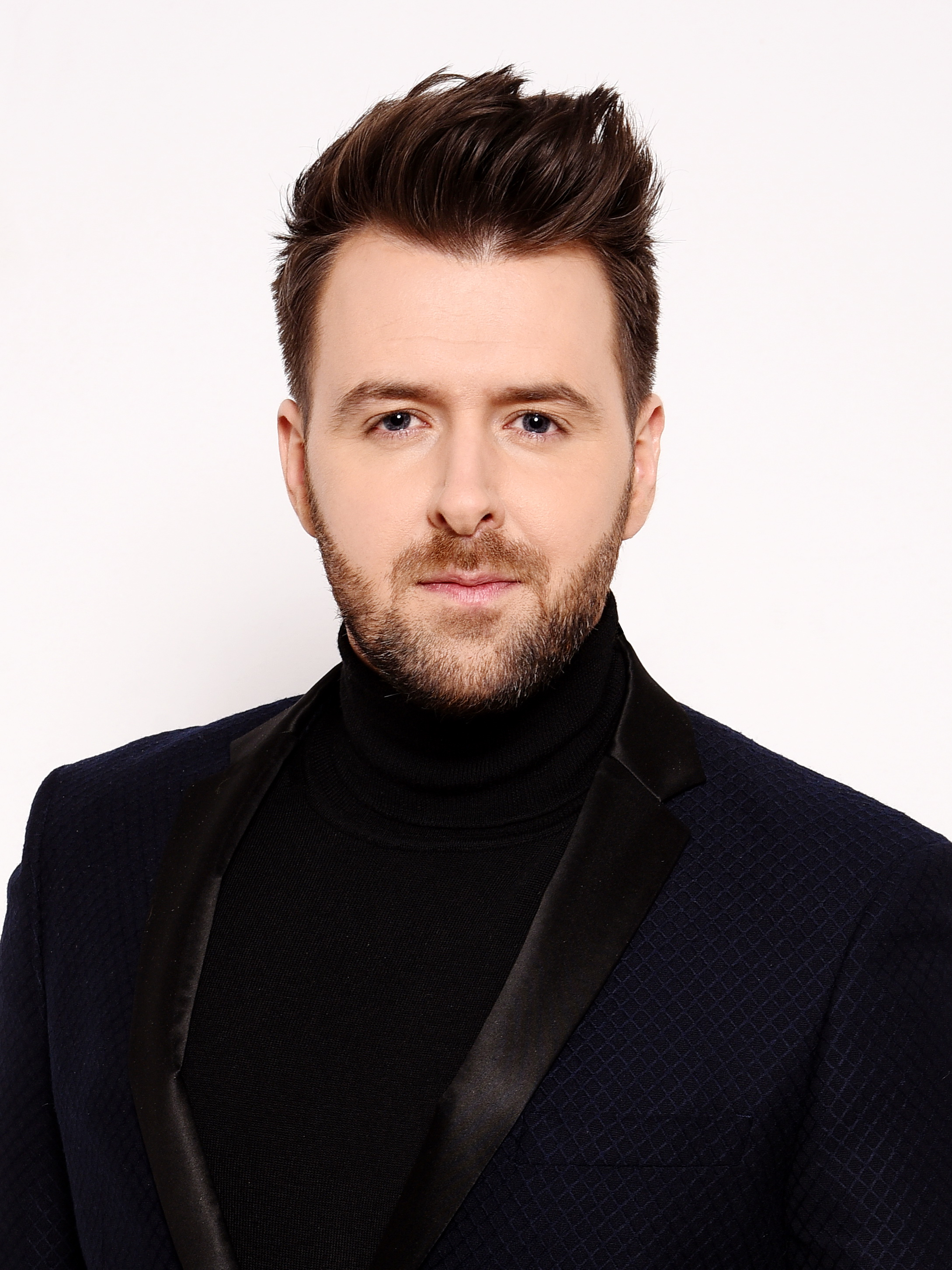
Grzegorz Hyży

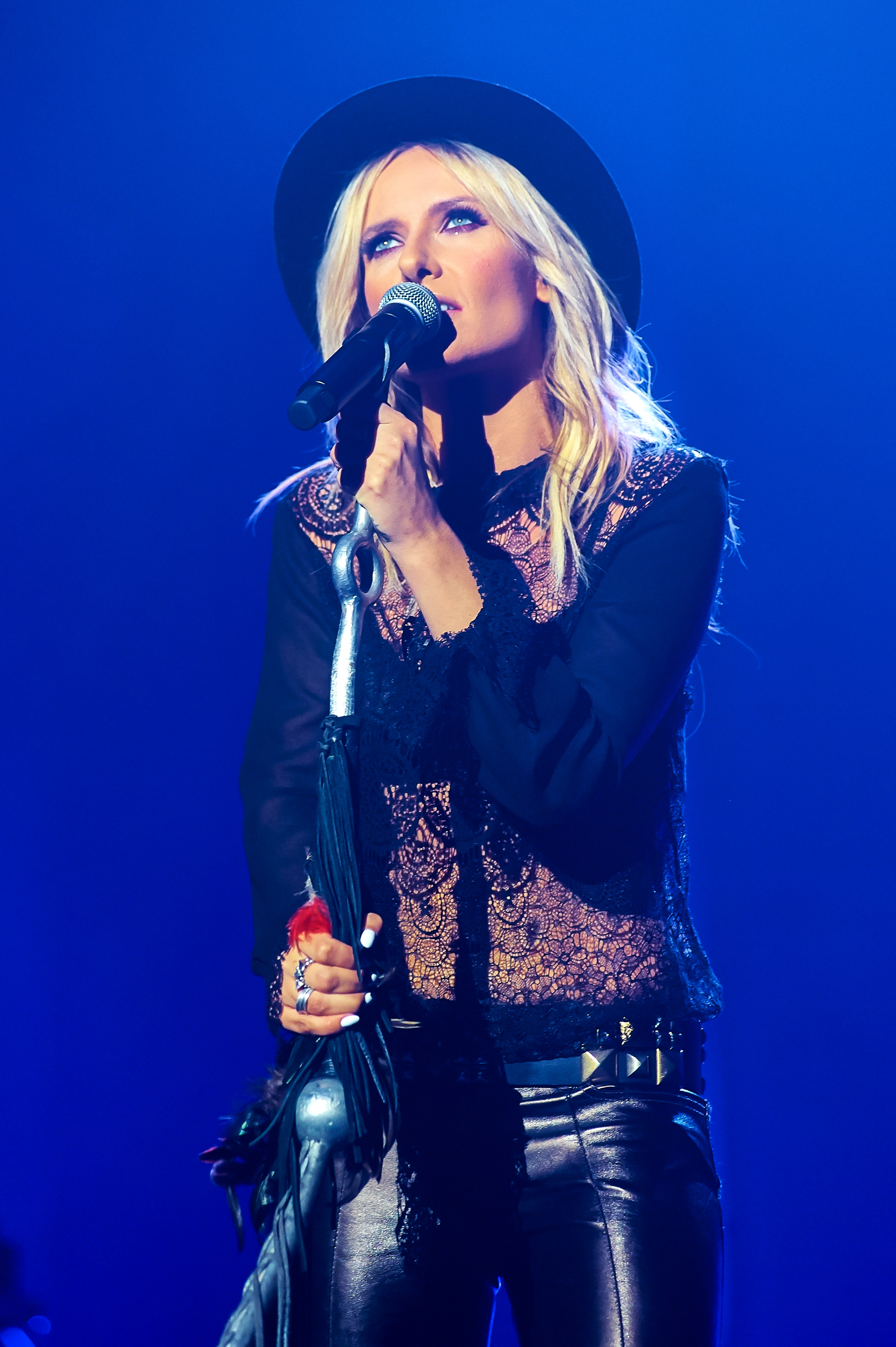
Patrycja Markowska

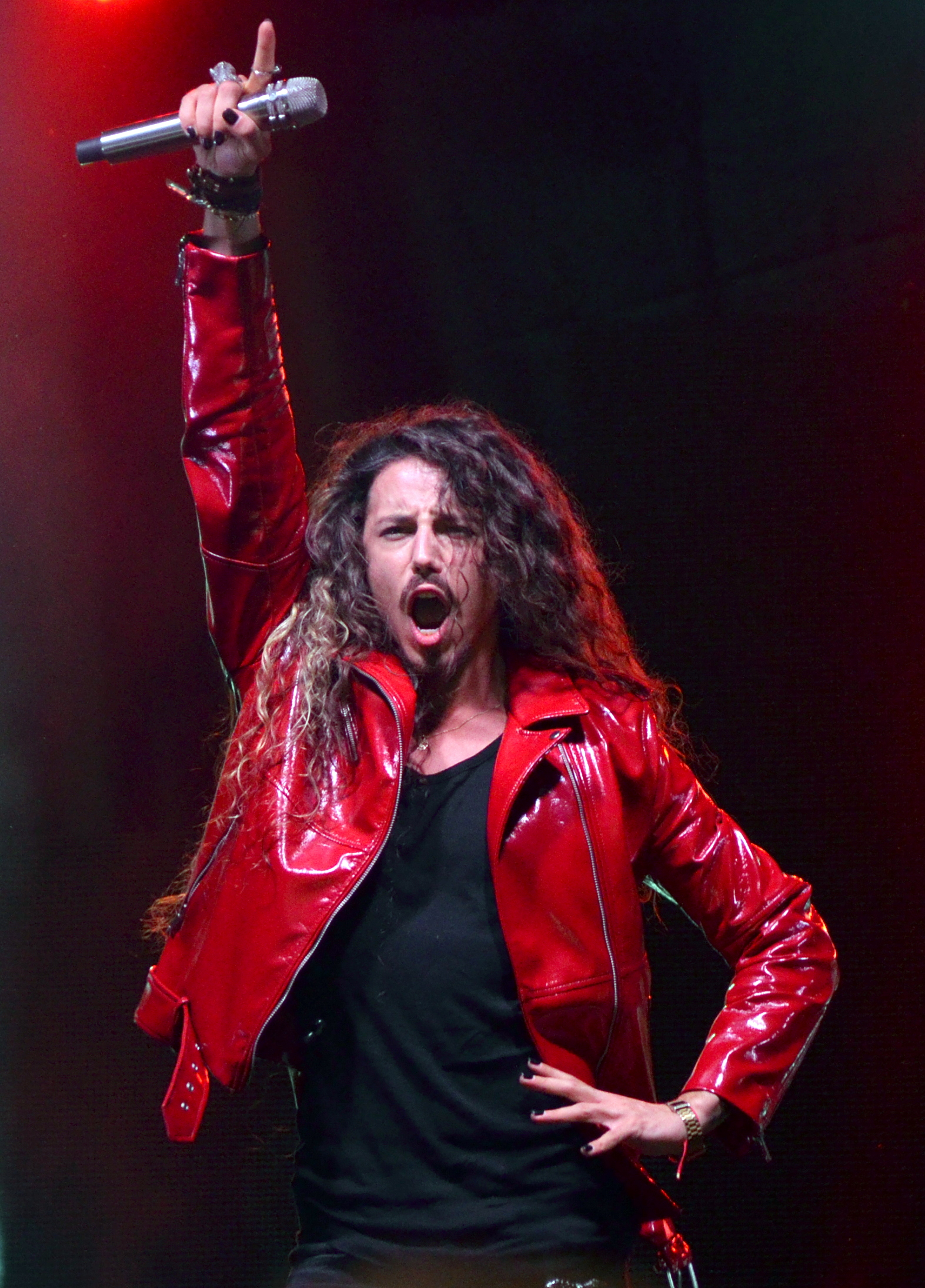
Michał Szpak

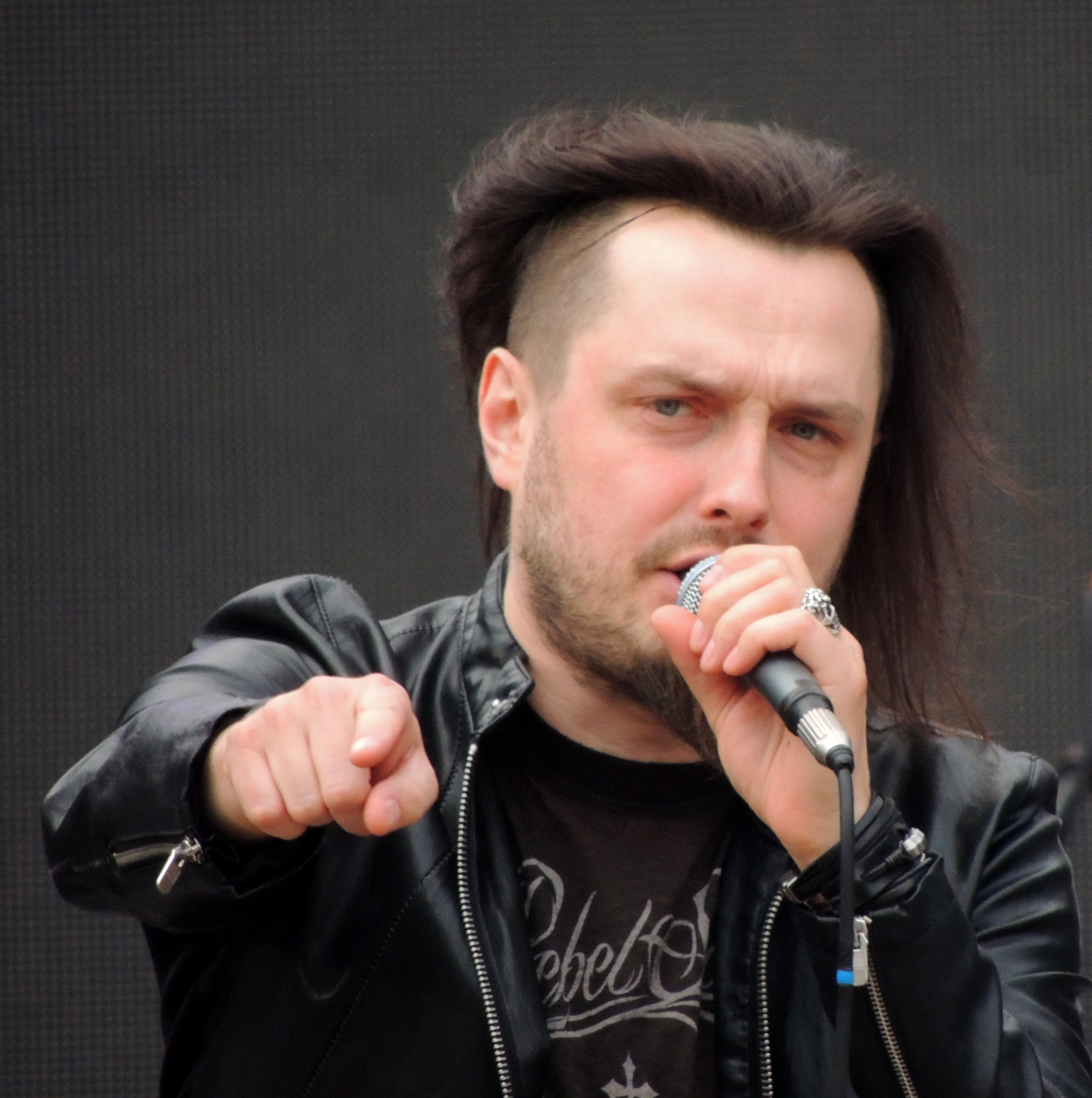
Piotr Cugowski

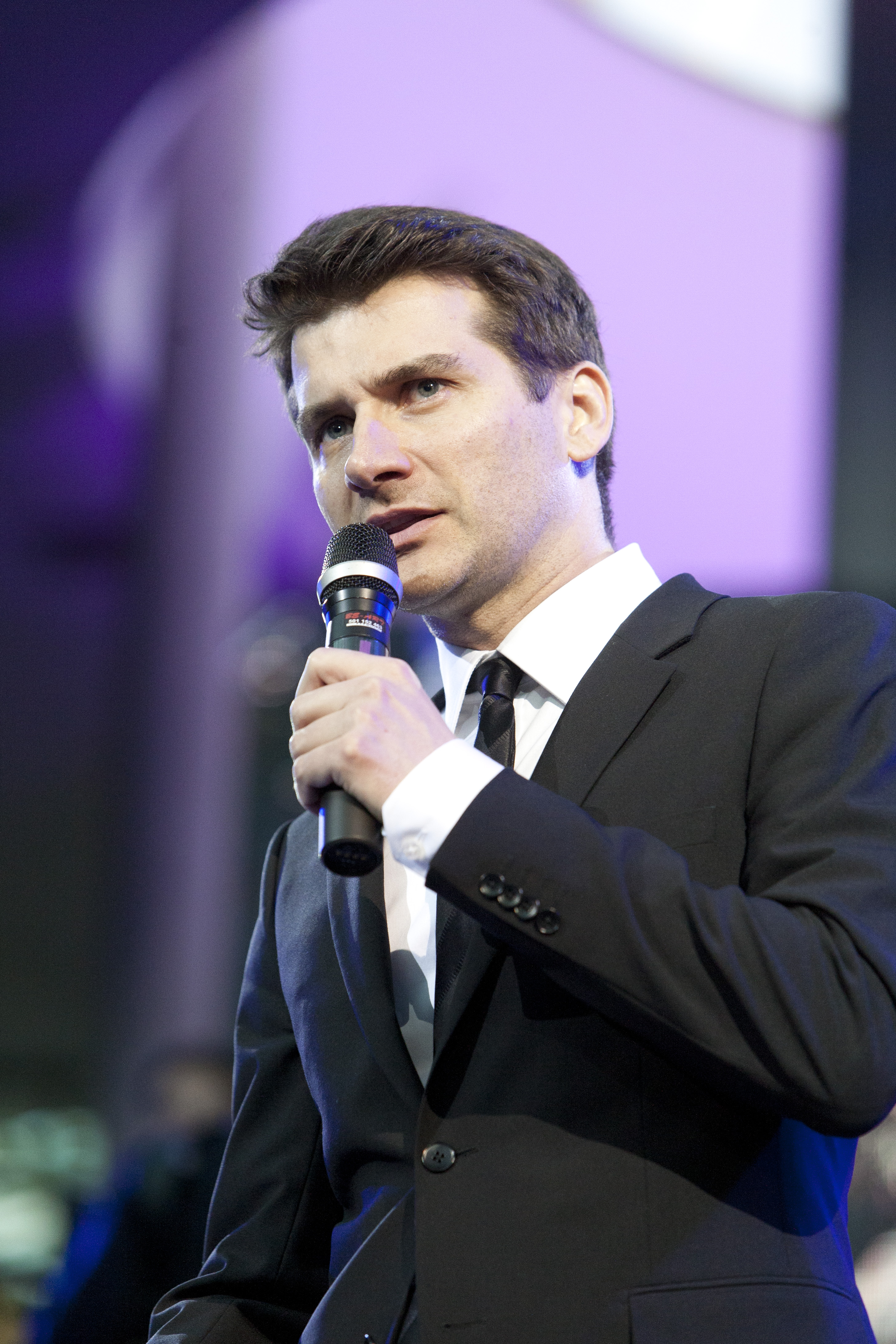
Tomasz Kammel

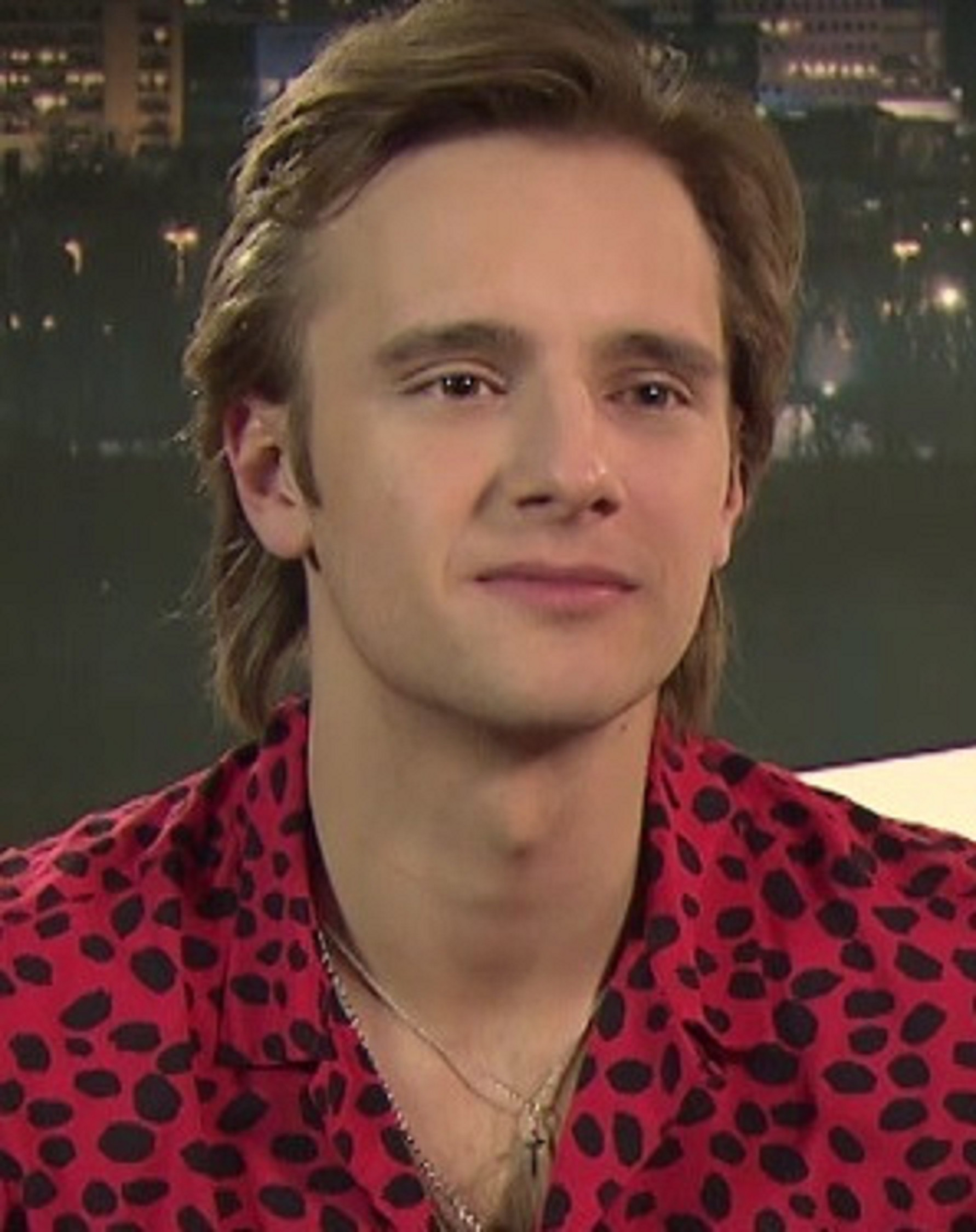
Maciej Musiał

== Teams ==
Color key

- Winner
- Runner-up
- Third place
- Fourth place
- Eliminated in the Semifinals
- Eliminated in the Live round
- Eliminated in the Knockout round
- Artist was stolen by another coach (Name is strikethroughed)
- Artist was stolen but was later switched with another artist and got eliminated
- Eliminated in the Battle rounds

Coaches	Top 52 artists				
Grzegorz Hyży					
Grzegorz Hyży	Anna Deko	Aleksandra Tocka	Natalia Capelik-Muianga	Nicole Kulesza	Maciej Mazur
Grzegorz Hyży	Konrad Słoka	~~Natalia Smagacka~~	Wojciech Stefanowski	Kacper Hartung	Kamila Kamocka
Grzegorz Hyży	Magdalena Putkowska	Kirill Mednikov	Wojciech Ezzat	Dominika Kuręda	
Patrycja Markowska					
Patrycja Markowska	Marcin Sójka	Gosia Pauka	Maksymilian Łapiński	Dawid Dubajka	Albina Mruchko
Patrycja Markowska	Jay Allen	Marianna Linde	~~Konrad Słoka~~	~~Aleksandra Smerechańska~~	Sylwia Kwasiborska
Patrycja Markowska	Milena Mocek	Tomasz Jasiński	Tomasz Wołodkowicz	Alicja Śmielak	
Michał Szpak					
Michał Szpak	Natalia Zastępa	Izabela Szafrańska	Wioleta Markowska	Natalia Smagacka	Leon Krześniak
Michał Szpak	Karol Wasilewski	Jadwiga Kuzaka	~~Marianna Linde~~	Kamil Kacprzyk	Paula Brzóska
Michał Szpak	Roksana Czerniec	Tobiasz Fejdasz	Klaudia Sułat	Martyna Kasprzycka	
Piotr Cugowski					
Piotr Cugowski	Maksymilian Kwapień	Diana Ciecierska	Mario Szaban	Aleksandra Smerechańska	Paweł Szutta
Piotr Cugowski	Aleksander Woźniak	Justyna Bardo	Dawid Muchewicz	Sebastian Wojtczak	Daria Adamczewska
Piotr Cugowski	Daniel Warakomski	Iza Tkocz	Ula Laudańska	Michał Steciak	

== Blind auditions ==
Color keys

✔	Coach hit his/her "I WANT YOU" button
	Artist defaulted to this coach's team
	Artist elected to join this coach's team
	Artist eliminated with no coach pressing his or her "I WANT YOU" button
	Artist received an 'All Turn'.

=== Episode 1 (September 1, 2018) ===
Order	Artist	Age	Song	Coach's and contestant's choices			
Order	Artist	Age	Song	Grzegorz	Patrycja	Michał	Piotr
1	Daria Adamczewska	19	Here I Go Again	✔	✔	—	✔
2	Nicole Kulesza	26	New Rules	✔	✔	✔	✔
3	Konrad Słoka	30	Sweet Creature	✔	✔	✔	—
4	Błażej Sudnikowicz	27	Nad przepaścią^{1}	—	—	—	—
5	Martyna Sabak	26	Nieznajomy	—	—	—	—
6	Gosia Pauka	27	All Summer Long	✔	✔	✔	✔

=== Episode 2 (September 1, 2018) ===
Order	Artist	Age	Song	Coach's and contestant's choices			
Order	Artist	Age	Song	Grzegorz	Patrycja	Michał	Piotr
1	Jolanta Nykaza	25	Don't Speak	—	—	—	—
2	Kamil Kacprzyk	20	Flashlight	✔	—	✔	—
3	Dawid Dubajka	23	All I Want	✔	✔	✔	—
4	Leon Krześniak	24	Nie stało się nic^{2} / Podatek od miłości^{3}	✔	✔	✔	✔
5	Anna Deko	26	Chandelier	✔	✔	✔	✔
6	Paula Brzóska	20	Love Is A Losing Game	✔	✔	✔	✔
7	Maksymilian Kwapień	22	Respect	✔	✔	✔	✔

=== Episode 3 (September 8, 2018) ===
Order	Artist	Age	Song	Coach's and contestant's choices			
Order	Artist	Age	Song	Grzegorz	Patrycja	Michał	Piotr
1	Natalia Smagacka	21	Fighter	✔	✔	✔	✔
2	Michał Słomka	22	Niech pomyślą, że to ja^{4}	—	—	—	—
3	Jadwiga Kuzaka	18	Sweet Creature	—	✔	✔	—
4	Maksymilian Łapiński	24	These Days	✔	✔	✔	✔
5	Natalia Capelik-Muianga	20	No Roots	✔	✔	✔	✔
6	Ewa Żydołowicz	26	Świat się pomylił^{5}	—	—	—	—
7	Maciej Mazur	24	Sign Of The Times	✔	✔	✔	✔

=== Episode 4 (September 15, 2018) ===
Order	Artist	Age	Song	Coach's and contestant's choices			
Order	Artist	Age	Song	Grzegorz	Patrycja	Michał	Piotr
1	Wioleta Markowska	25	Alone	—	✔	✔	—
2	Dawid Muchewicz	32	Hey Brother	✔	—	✔	✔
3	Ilona Kossakowska	21	Motyle i ćmy^{6}	—	—	—	—
4	Wojciech Stefanowski	16	Want To Want Me	✔	—	✔	—
5	Tomasz Wołodkowicz	22	Opowiadaj mi tak^{7}	—	✔	—	✔
6	Magdalena Putkowska	19	Podaruj mi trochę słońca^{8}	✔	—	—	✔
7	Sylwia Kwasiborska	37	Hold Back The River	✔	✔	—	✔

=== Episode 5 (September 15, 2018) ===
Order	Artist	Age	Song	Coach's and contestant's choices			
Order	Artist	Age	Song	Grzegorz	Patrycja	Michał	Piotr
1	Tobiasz Fejdasz	19	Home	✔	—	✔	—
2	Łukasz Madej	29	Don't Poison Your Heart^{9}	—	—	—	—
3	Tomasz Jasiński	41	Szerokie wody^{10}	—	✔	—	—
4	Iza Tkocz	27	Heaven	—	—	—	✔
5	Milena Mocek	16	All I Want	✔	✔	✔	—
6	Kirill Mednikov	22	Hold Back The River	✔	—	—	✔
7	Aleksandra Tocka	21	Respect	✔	✔	✔	✔

=== Episode 6 (September 22, 2018) ===
Order	Artist	Age	Song	Coach's and contestant's choices			
Order	Artist	Age	Song	Grzegorz	Patrycja	Michał	Piotr
1	Albina Mruchko	21	Only Love Can Hurt Like This	—	✔	—	—
2	Kacper Hartung	21	Stand by Me	✔	—	✔	✔
3	Anna Sejdak	28	Fighter	—	—	—	—
4	Klaudia Jóźwiak	22	New Rules	—	—	—	—
5	Klaudia Sułat	25	Nie chcę więcej^{11}	✔	✔	✔	✔
6	Natalia Zastępa	16	Skyfall	✔	✔	✔	—
7	Natalia Kryjom	29	Dobry Moment^{12}	—	—	—	—
8	Mario Szaban	44	Home	✔	✔	✔	✔

=== Episode 7 (September 29, 2018) ===
Order	Artist	Age	Song	Coach's and contestant's choices			
Order	Artist	Age	Song	Grzegorz	Patrycja	Michał	Piotr
1	Ula Laudańska	18	Ale jestem	—	—	—	✔
2	Karol Wasilewski	17	Stay	✔	✔	✔	✔
3	Kamila Kamocka	18	Wrecking Ball	✔	—	✔	—
4	Michał Steciak	31	Time to Say Goodbye	—	—	✔	✔
5	Daniel Cicirko	18	Jak długo jeszcze^{13}	—	—	—	—
6	Aleksandra Smerechańska	17	Alone	✔	✔	✔	✔
7	Sebastian Wojtczak	34	Everybody Needs Somebody to Love	—	—	—	✔

=== Episode 8 (September 29, 2018) ===
Order	Artist	Age	Song	Coach's and contestant's choices			
Order	Artist	Age	Song	Grzegorz	Patrycja	Michał	Piotr
1	Alicja Śmielak	18	Roar	—	✔	—	—
2	Jarosław Gołoś	23	I'm Still Standing	—	—	—	—
3	Jay Allen	34	Love Runs Out	✔	✔	—	—
4	Dominika Kuręda	20	Krakowski spleen^{14}	✔	✔	—	—
5	Justyna Bardo	29	Girl on Fire	—	✔	—	✔
6	Roksana Czerniec	19	Happier	✔	✔	✔	—
7	Daniel Warakomski	28	Here I Go Again	—	✔	—	✔

=== Episode 9 (October 6, 2018) ===
Order	Artist	Age	Song	Coach's and contestant's choices			
Order	Artist	Age	Song	Grzegorz	Patrycja	Michał	Piotr
1	Paweł Szutta	36	Basket Case	—	✔	—	✔
2	Julia Honkisz	19	Stay	—	—	—	—
3	Diana Ciecierska	24	All Right Now	—	✔	✔	✔
4	Wiktoria Perzanowska	18	Z Tobą nie umiem wygrać^{15}	—	—	—	—
5	Martyna Kasprzycka	18	Stand by Me	—	—	✔	—
6	Thomas Grotto	47	Sofia	—	—	—	—
7	Izabela Szafrańska	25	Flashlight	✔	✔	✔	✔

=== Episode 10 (October 6, 2018) ===
Order	Artist	Age	Song	Coach's and contestant's choices			
Order	Artist	Age	Song	Grzegorz	Patrycja	Michał	Piotr
1	Alek Woźniak	18	Jestem tego wart^{16}	—	✔	✔	✔
2	Anita Kaczerzewska	20	Let Her Go	—	—	—	—
3	Marianna Linde	25	Love Is a Losing Game	—	—	✔	✔
4	Mariusz Czajka	24	Nie chcę więcej^{17}	—	—	—	—
5	Wojciech Ezzat	34	There's Nothing Holdin' Me Back	✔	✔	✔	✔
6	Christine Kelly	18	Byle jak	—	—	—	—
7	Marcin Sójka	31	Czas nas uczy pogody^{18}	✔	✔	✔	✔

^1 by Bracia (feat. Edyta Bartosiewicz) ^2 by Wilki ^3 by Kayah & Grzegorz Hyży ^4 by Grzegorz Hyży ^5 by Patrycja Markowska ^6 by Sarsa ^7 by Zbigniew Wodecki ^8 by Bemibek ^9 by Michał Szpak ^10 by Mrozu ^11 ^17 by Michał Bajor ^12 by Kortez ^13 by Kamil Bednarek ^14 by Maanam ^15 by Ania ^16 by Paweł Domagała ^18 by Grażyna Łobaszewska

== The Battle Rounds ==
Color keys

Artist won the Battle and advances to the Knockouts
Artist lost the Battle but was stolen by another coach and advances to the Knockouts
Artist lost the Battle and was stolen by another coach, but was later switched with another artist and eliminated
Artist lost the Battle and was eliminated

Episode & Date	Coach	Order	Winner	Song	Loser	'Steal' result			
Episode & Date	Coach	Order	Winner	Song	Loser	Grzegorz	Patrycja	Michał	Piotr
Episode 11 (October 13)	Grzegorz Hyży	1	Natalia Capelik-Muianga	"I Know What You Did Last Summer"	Wojciech Stefanowski	—N/a	—	✔	—
Episode 11 (October 13)	Patrycja Markowska	2	Dawid Dubajka	"Skinny Love"	Milena Mocek	✔	—N/a	—	—
Episode 11 (October 13)	Michał Szpak	3	Natalia Zastępa	"Nic nie może wiecznie trwać"^{1}	Martyna Kasprzycka	—	—	—N/a	—
Episode 11 (October 13)	Grzegorz Hyży	4	Maciej Mazur	"Huragan"^{2}	Kirill Mednikov	—N/a	—	—	—
Episode 11 (October 13)	Grzegorz Hyży	4	Maciej Mazur	"Huragan"^{2}	Wojciech Ezzat	—N/a	—	—	—
Episode 11 (October 13)	Piotr Cugowski	5	Diana Ciecierska	"Black Velvet"	Daria Adamczewska	—	✔	—	—N/a
Episode 11 (October 13)	Michał Szpak	6	Karol Wasilewski	"You Are the Reason"	Klaudia Sułat	—	—	—N/a	—
Episode 11 (October 13)	Patrycja Markowska	7	Albina Mruchko	"If It Makes You Happy"	Sylwia Kwasiborska	✔	—N/a	—	✔
Episode 11 (October 13)	Piotr Cugowski	8	Mario Szaban	"End of the Road"	Sebastian Wojtczak	—	✔	✔	—N/a
Episode 12 (October 20)	Michał Szpak	1	Izabela Szafrańska	"Need You Now"	Tobiasz Fejdasz	—	—	—N/a	—
Episode 12 (October 20)	Grzegorz Hyży	2	N/A^{3}	"Granda"^{4}	Dominika Kuręda	—N/a	—	—	—
Episode 12 (October 20)	Grzegorz Hyży	2	N/A^{3}	"Granda"^{4}	Magdalena Putkowska	—N/a	—	—	—
Episode 12 (October 20)	Piotr Cugowski	3	Maksymilian Kwapień	"Knockin' on Heaven's Door"	Michał Steciak	—	—	—	—N/a
Episode 12 (October 20)	Michał Szpak	4	Leon Krześniak	"Lady"	Marianna Linde	—	✔	—N/a	—
Episode 12 (October 20)	Patrycja Markowska	5	Jay Allen	"Come and Get It"	Alicja Śmielak	—	—N/a	—	—
Episode 12 (October 20)	Piotr Cugowski	6	Justyna Bardo	"Nigdy więcej nie tańcz ze mną"^{5}	Ula Laudańska	—	—	—	—N/a
Episode 12 (October 20)	Piotr Cugowski	6	Justyna Bardo	"Nigdy więcej nie tańcz ze mną"^{5}	Izabela Tkocz	—	—	—	—N/a
Episode 12 (October 20)	Grzegorz Hyży	7	Nicole Kulesza	"Take Me to Church"	Kamila Kamocka	—N/a	—	—	—
Episode 12 (October 20)	Patrycja Markowska	8	Marcin Sójka	"Sen o Warszawie"^{6}	Tomasz Wołodkowicz	—	—N/a	—	—
Episode 12 (October 20)	Patrycja Markowska	8	Marcin Sójka	"Sen o Warszawie"^{6}	Tomasz Jasiński	—	—N/a	—	—
Episode 13 (October 27)	Grzegorz Hyży	1	Anna Deko	"Hot Right Now"	Natalia Smagacka	—N/a	—	✔	✔
Episode 13 (October 27)	Michał Szpak	2	Wioleta Markowska	"I wszystko się może zdarzyć"^{7}	Roksana Czerniec	—	—	Steal limit reached	—
Episode 13 (October 27)	Patrycja Markowska	3	Maksymilian Łapiński	"Początek"^{8}	Aleksandra Smerechańska	✔	—N/a	Steal limit reached	✔
Episode 13 (October 27)	Michał Szpak	4	Jadwiga Kuzaka	"Havana"	Paula Brzóska	—	—	Steal limit reached	—
Episode 13 (October 27)	Michał Szpak	4	Jadwiga Kuzaka	"Havana"	Kamil Kacprzyk	—	—	Steal limit reached	—
Episode 13 (October 27)	Piotr Cugowski	5	Alek Woźniak	"Peron"^{9}	Daniel Warakomski	—	—	Steal limit reached	—N/a
Episode 13 (October 27)	Grzegorz Hyży	6	Aleksandra Tocka	"Sex on Fire"	Kacper Hartung	—N/a	—	Steal limit reached	—
Episode 13 (October 27)	Piotr Cugowski	7	Paweł Szutta	"Stand by My Woman"^{10}	Dawid Muchewicz	✔	—	Steal limit reached	—N/a
Episode 13 (October 27)	Patrycja Markowska	8	Gosia Pauka	"Piece of My Heart"	Konrad Słoka	✔	—N/a	Steal limit reached	—

^1 by Anna Jantar ^2 by Mrozu ^3 No one won the battle ^4 by Brodka ^5 by Ania ^6 by Czesław Niemen ^7 by Anita Lipnicka ^8 by Zalewski (feat. Kortez, Podsiadło) ^9 by Jamal ^10 by Lenny Kravitz

== The Knockout Round ==
=== Episode 14 (November 3, 2018) ===
Knockouts took place on 3 November 2018.

Color keys

Contestant was not switched out and advanced to the Live Shows
Contestant was eliminated, either immediately (indicated by a "—" in the "Switched with" column) or switched with another contestant

Coach	Order	Artist	Song	Result	Switched with
Michał Szpak	1	Natalia Smagacka	"Something's Got a Hold on Me"	Advanced	N/A
Michał Szpak	2	Jadwiga Kuzaka	"Zanim zrozumiesz"^{1}	Eliminated	N/A
Michał Szpak	3	Wioleta Markowska	"True Colors"	Advanced	N/A
Michał Szpak	4	Karol Wasilewski	"I'm Not The Only One"	Eliminated	N/A
Michał Szpak	5	Natalia Zastępa	"The Climb"	Advanced	Karol Wasilewski
Michał Szpak	6	Izabela Szafrańska	"The Power of Love"	Advanced	Jadwiga Kuzaka
Michał Szpak	7	Leon Krześniak	"Friends"	Eliminated	—
Grzegorz Hyży	1	Anna Deko	"Deeper"	Advanced	N/A
Grzegorz Hyży	2	Natalia Capelik-Muianga	"I'd Rather Go Blind"	Advanced	N/A
Grzegorz Hyży	3	Nicole Kulesza	"Right to Be Wrong"	Advanced	N/A
Grzegorz Hyży	4	Maciej Mazur	"Nic do stracenia"^{2}	Eliminated	N/A
Grzegorz Hyży	5	Aleksandra Tocka	"Jestem Kamieniem"^{3}	Advanced	Maciej Mazur
Grzegorz Hyży	6	Konrad Słoka	"Like a Rolling Stone"	Eliminated	—
Patrycja Markowska	1	Jay Allen	"Dude (Looks Like a Lady)"	Eliminated	N/A
Patrycja Markowska	2	Marianna Linde	"Wariatka tańczy"^{4}	Eliminated	N/A
Patrycja Markowska	3	Dawid Dubajka	"Another Love"	Advanced	N/A
Patrycja Markowska	4	Albina Mruchko	"Lustra"^{5}	Eliminated	N/A
Patrycja Markowska	5	Marcin Sójka	"Have I Told You Lately"	Advanced	Albina Mruchko
Patrycja Markowska	6	Maksymilian Łapiński	"Stolen Dance"	Advanced	Jay Allen
Patrycja Markowska	7	Gosia Pauka	"Miód"^{6}	Advanced	Marianna Linde
Piotr Cugowski	1	Justyna Bardo	"Valerie"	Eliminated	N/A
Piotr Cugowski	2	Aleksander Woźniak	"Trójkąty i kwadraty"^{7}	Eliminated	N/A
Piotr Cugowski	3	Maksymilian Kwapień	"Cry Baby"	Advanced	N/A
Piotr Cugowski	4	Paweł Szutta	"Time Is Running Out"	Eliminated	N/A
Piotr Cugowski	5	Mario Szaban	"Georgia on My Mind"	Advanced	Justyna Bardo
Piotr Cugowski	6	Aleksandra Smerechańska	"Next to Me"	Advanced	Aleksander Woźniak
Piotr Cugowski	7	Diana Ciecierska	"Just like a Pill"	Advanced	Paweł Szutta

^1 by Varius Manx ^2 by Mrozu ^3 by Kayah ^4 by Maryla Rodowicz ^5 by Natalia Szroeder ^6 by Natalia Przybysz ^7 by Dawid Podsiadło

== Live Shows ==
Color keys

Artist was saved by Public's vote
Artist was saved by his/her coach
Artist was eliminated

=== Episode 15 - Quarter-Final (November 17, 2018) ===
Order	Coach	Artist	Song	Result
1	Michał Szpak	Izabela Szafrańska	"There You'll Be"	Michał's choice
2	Michał Szpak	Natalia Smagacka	"Domino"	Eliminated
3	Michał Szpak	Wioleta Markowska	"Kasztany"	Eliminated
4	Michał Szpak	Natalia Zastępa	"Without You"	Public's Vote
1	Piotr Cugowski	Diana Ciecierska	"You Shook Me All Night Long"	Piotr's Choice
2	Piotr Cugowski	Mario Szaban	"W wielkim mieście"	Eliminated
3	Piotr Cugowski	Aleksandra Smerechańska	"Try"	Eliminated
4	Piotr Cugowski	Maksymilian Kwapień	"O! Nie rób tyle hałasu"	Public's Vote
1	Patrycja Markowska	Dawid Dubajka	"Photograph"	Eliminated
2	Patrycja Markowska	Maksymilian Łapiński	"Weź nie pytaj"	Eliminated
3	Patrycja Markowska	Gosia Pauka	"Son of a Preacher Man"	Patrycja's Choice
4	Patrycja Markowska	Marcin Sójka	"To Love Somebody"	Public's Vote
1	Grzegorz Hyży	Nicole Kulesza	"Spokój"	Eliminated
2	Grzegorz Hyży	Aleksandra Tocka	"Wielka dama"	Public's Vote
3	Grzegorz Hyży	Natalia Capelik-Muianga	"Runnin' (Lose It All)"	Eliminated
4	Grzegorz Hyży	Anna Deko	"Wolves"	Grzegorz's Choice

Non-competition performances
Order	Performers	Song
1	Michał Szpak	"Dreamer"
2	Years & Years	"King"
3	Piotr Cugowski	"Kto nie kochał"
4	Michał Szczygieł	"Będzie co ma być"
5	Patrycja Markowska & Ray Wilson	"Bezustannie"
6	Years & Years	"All for You"
7	Grzegorz Hyży	"Pech to nie grzech"

=== Episode 16 - Semifinal (November 24, 2018) ===
Order	Coach	Artist	Cover song	Original song	Finalist's song	Points			Result
Order	Coach	Artist	Cover song	Original song	Finalist's song	Coach	Public	Total	Result
1	Grzegorz Hyży	Aleksandra Tocka	"Russian Roulette"	Światłocień	—N/a	40%	47%	87%	Eliminated
2	Grzegorz Hyży	Anna Deko	"A To Co Mam"	"Stały Ląd"	"Chandelier"	60%	53%	113%	Advanced
1	Patrycja Markowska	Gosia Pauka	"Kiedy Powiem Sobie Dość"	"Miasto Kobiet"	—N/a	48%	22%	70%	Eliminated
2	Patrycja Markowska	Marcin Sójka	"Niewiele Ci Mogę Dać"	"Zaskakuj Mnie"	"Have I Told You Lately"	52%	78%	130%	Advanced
1	Michał Szpak	Natalia Zastępa	"Dłoń"	"Za Późno"	"The Climb"	49%	72%	121%	Advanced
2	Michał Szpak	Izabela Szafrańska	"Co Mi Panie Dasz"	"Zatapiam Się"	—N/a	51%	28%	79%	Eliminated
1	Piotr Cugowski	Maksymilian Kwapień	"Amazing"	"PodRóże"	"Respect"	45%	57%	102%	Advanced
2	Piotr Cugowski	Diana Ciecierska	"Mister Of America"	"Żyj Z Tym Sam"	—N/a	55%	43%	98%	Eliminated

=== Episode 17 - Final (December 1, 2018) ===
Result details

- Winner
- Runner-up
- Third place
- Fourth Place

Order	Coach	Artist	Song		Result
1	Grzegorz Hyży	Anna Deko	Solo song	I Have Nothing	Third place
1	Grzegorz Hyży	Anna Deko	Duet with coach Grzegorz Hyży	Shallow	Third place
1	Grzegorz Hyży	Anna Deko	Top 3 song	Za późno	Third place
1	Grzegorz Hyży	Anna Deko	Finalist's song	—N/a	Third place
2	Patrycja Markowska	Marcin Sójka	Solo song	Who Wants to Live Forever	Winner
2	Patrycja Markowska	Marcin Sójka	Duet with coach Patrycja Markowska	No Ordinary Love	Winner
2	Patrycja Markowska	Marcin Sójka	Top 3 song	Małe Tęsknoty	Winner
2	Patrycja Markowska	Marcin Sójka	Finalist's song	Zaskakuj Mnie	Winner
3	Michał Szpak	Natalia Zastępa	Solo song	Angel	Runner-up
3	Michał Szpak	Natalia Zastępa	Duet with coach Michał Szpak	Golden Eye	Runner-up
3	Michał Szpak	Natalia Zastępa	Top 3 song	Bezdroża	Runner-up
3	Michał Szpak	Natalia Zastępa	Finalist's song	Za późno	Runner-up
4	Piotr Cugowski	Maksymilian Kwapień	Solo song	Born To Be Wild	Fourth Place
4	Piotr Cugowski	Maksymilian Kwapień	Duet with coach Piotr Cugowski	Whole Lotta Love	Fourth Place
4	Piotr Cugowski	Maksymilian Kwapień	Top 3 song	—N/a	Fourth Place
4	Piotr Cugowski	Maksymilian Kwapień	Finalist's song	—N/a	Fourth Place

Non-competition performances
Order	Performers	Song
1	Michał Szpak i Natalia Zastępa	Golden Eye
2	Patrycja Markowska i Marcin Sójka	No ordinary love
3	Afromental	Korzenie
4	Grzegorz Hyży i Anna Deko	Shallow
5	Piotr Cugowski i Maksymilian Kwapień	Whole lotta love
7	Dorota Rabczewska	Nie wolno płakać
8	Sarsa	Zakryj
9	Marta Gałuszewska	Nie mów mi nie
10	Wojciech Baranowski (Baranovski)	Luźno
11	Laura Pergolizzi (LP)	Girls Go Wild

== Results summary of live shows ==
Color keys
Artist's info

- Artist from Team Grzegorz Hyży
- Artist from Team Patrycja Markowska
- Artist from Team Michał Szpak
- Artist from Team Piotr Cugowski

Result details

- Artist was proclaimed as winner
- Artist was proclaimed as runner-up
- Artist was proclaimed as third place
- Artist was proclaimed as fourth place
- Artist advanced to the finals
- Artist was saved by his/her coach
- Artist was saved by the public
- Artist received the fewest accumulated total points and was eliminated
- Artist received the fewest of the public's vote and was eliminated

Live show results per week
Artist	Week 1	Week 2	Finals
Marcin Sójka	Safe	Advanced	Winner
Natalia Zastępa	Safe	Advanced	Runner-up
Anna Deko	Safe	Advanced	3rd Place
Maksymilian Kwapień	Safe	Advanced	4th Place
Aleksandra Tocka	Safe	Eliminated	Eliminated (Week 2)
Gosia Pauka	Safe	Eliminated	Eliminated (Week 2)
Izabela Szafrańska	Safe	Eliminated	Eliminated (Week 2)
Diana Ciecierska	Safe	Eliminated	Eliminated (Week 2)
Natalia Capelik-Muianga	Eliminated	Eliminated (Week 1)	
Nicole Kulesza	Eliminated	Eliminated (Week 1)	
Maksymilian Łapiński	Eliminated	Eliminated (Week 1)	
Dawid Dubajka	Eliminated	Eliminated (Week 1)	
Aleksandra Smerechańska	Eliminated	Eliminated (Week 1)	
Mario Szaban	Eliminated	Eliminated (Week 1)	
Natalia Smagacka	Eliminated	Eliminated (Week 1)	
Wioleta Markowska	Eliminated	Eliminated (Week 1)	
