= Kush Kush =

DJ and producer duo

KUSH KUSH
- Origin: Germany
- Genres: Pop, dance-pop, house
- Occupation: DJs
- Years active: 2017–present
- Labels: RAISON Music
- Website: www.kush-kush-music.com

Kush Kush, stylized as KUSH KUSH, is a German DJ and producer duo. They can be recognized by their Scandinavian hare masks, which intrigue the public while also concealing their identity. They are best known for their interpretations of well-known classics.

== Career ==
Their most successful release yet is called "Fight Back with Love Tonight", which samples White Town's hit single "Your Woman" from 1997. Kush Kush's electronic reinterpretation of the song was especially popular in Russia, where it stayed in the Airplay Charts for 10 weeks, peaking on #1 and also climbed the Shazam-Charts to #2. The single was presented with a Platinum-Award in fall 2018. As a result of the success of "Fight Back with Love Tonight", Kush Kush played at international festivals such as Alfa Future People Festival in Bolshoye Kozino and Europa Plus TV's Hit Non Stop Festival in Sochi.

Shortly after, Kush Kush entered the Russian radio charts again, peaking at #59 with their 2019 released song "SloMo". Most recently the duo released its single "I'm Blue" based on the 90's global Eurodance-hit Blue (Da Ba Dee) by Eiffel 65.

== Discography ==
Up until now Kush Kush released individual singles rather than full-length albums. Their releases can be identified easily as an image of a rabbit head can be found on each of their artworks.

Year	Title	Certification
2017	Fight Back with Love Tonight	RU: Platinum
2018	Sweet & Bitter (feat. Marta Gałuszewska)	
2019	SloMo (incl. remix by Achtabahn)	
2019	I'm Blue (incl. remix by Burak Yeter)	
2022	Never Ending Story (with Daria)	
