= The Voice of Poland season 8 =

Season of television series

The Voice of Poland
- Season 8
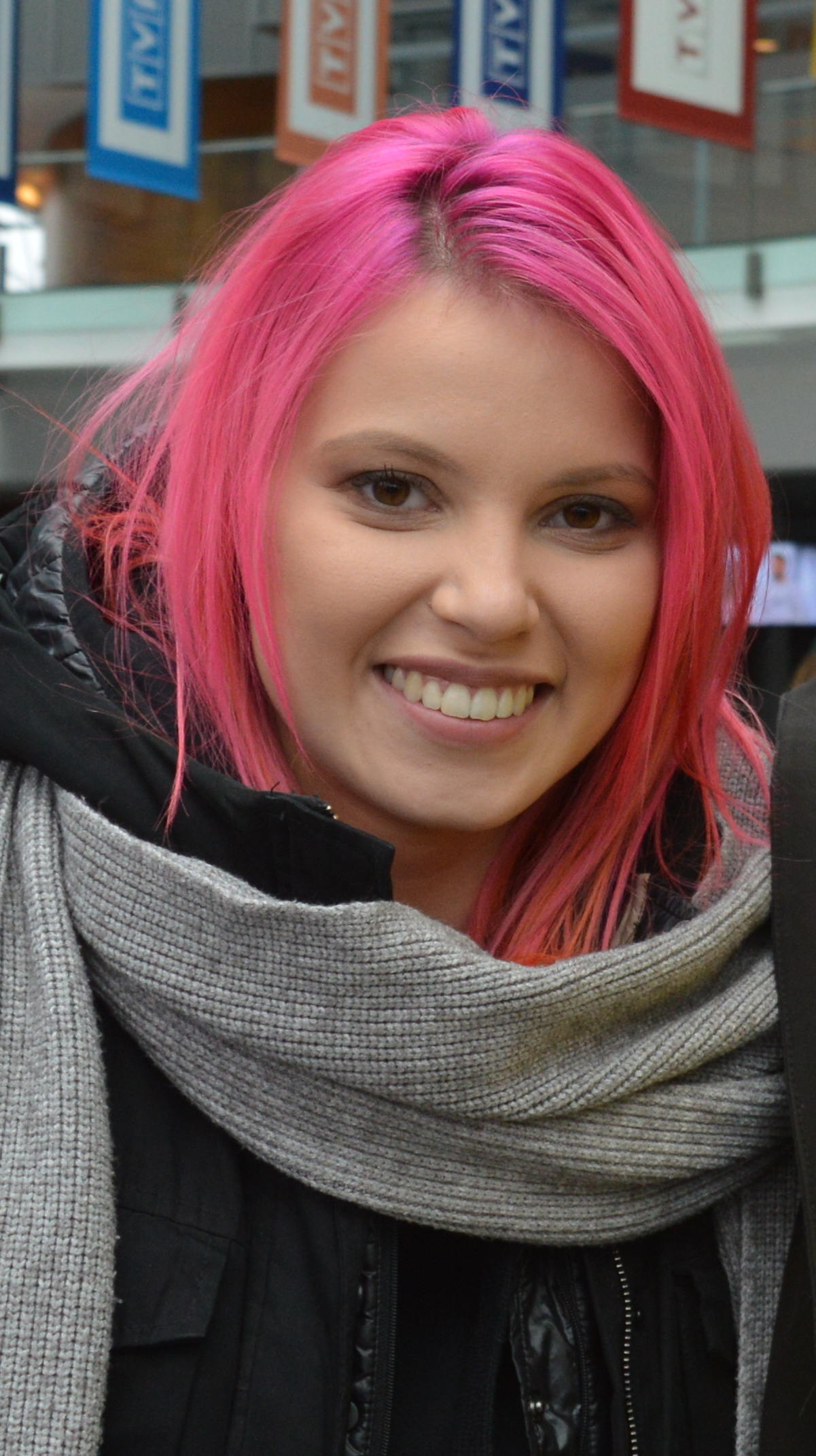
- Hosted by: Barbara Kurdej-Szatan; Maciej Musiał; Tomasz Kammel
- Judges: Andrzej Piaseczny; Maria Sadowska; Tomson & Baron; Michał Szpak
- Winner: Marta Gałuszewska
- Winning coach: Michał Szpak
- Runner-up: Łukasz Łyczkowski

Release
- Original network: TVP2
- Original release: September 2 – November 25, 2017

Season chronology
- ← Previous; Season 7 Next → Season 9

The eighth season of The Voice of Poland began airing on 2 September 2017 on TVP 2. It aired on Saturdays at 20:05 and 21:10.

Tomson & Baron, Andrzej Piaseczny and Maria Sadowska returned as coaches, while Michał Szpak replaced Natalia Kukulska.

== Coaches and Hosts ==
Tomson & Baron, Maria Sadowska and Andrzej Piaseczny return as coaches for the 8th edition. Michał Szpak replace the role of jurors Natalia Kukulska, who resigned from the post of judges in a professional capacity. Moderators Tomasz Kammel and Maciej Musiał Alongside Marcelina Zawadzka and Barbara Kurdej Szatan

Coaches and Hosts gallery

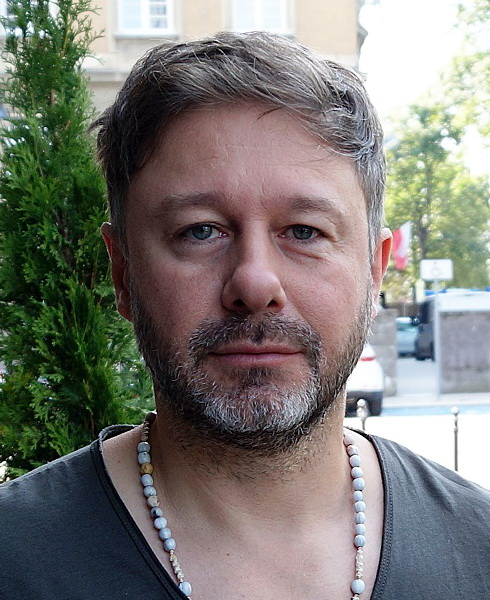
Andrzej Piaseczny

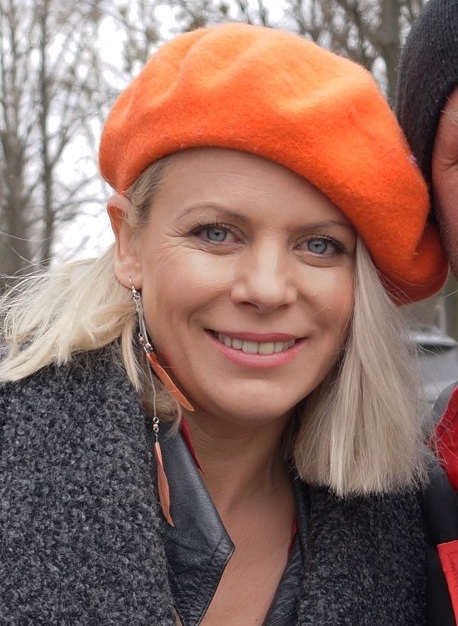
Maria Sadowska

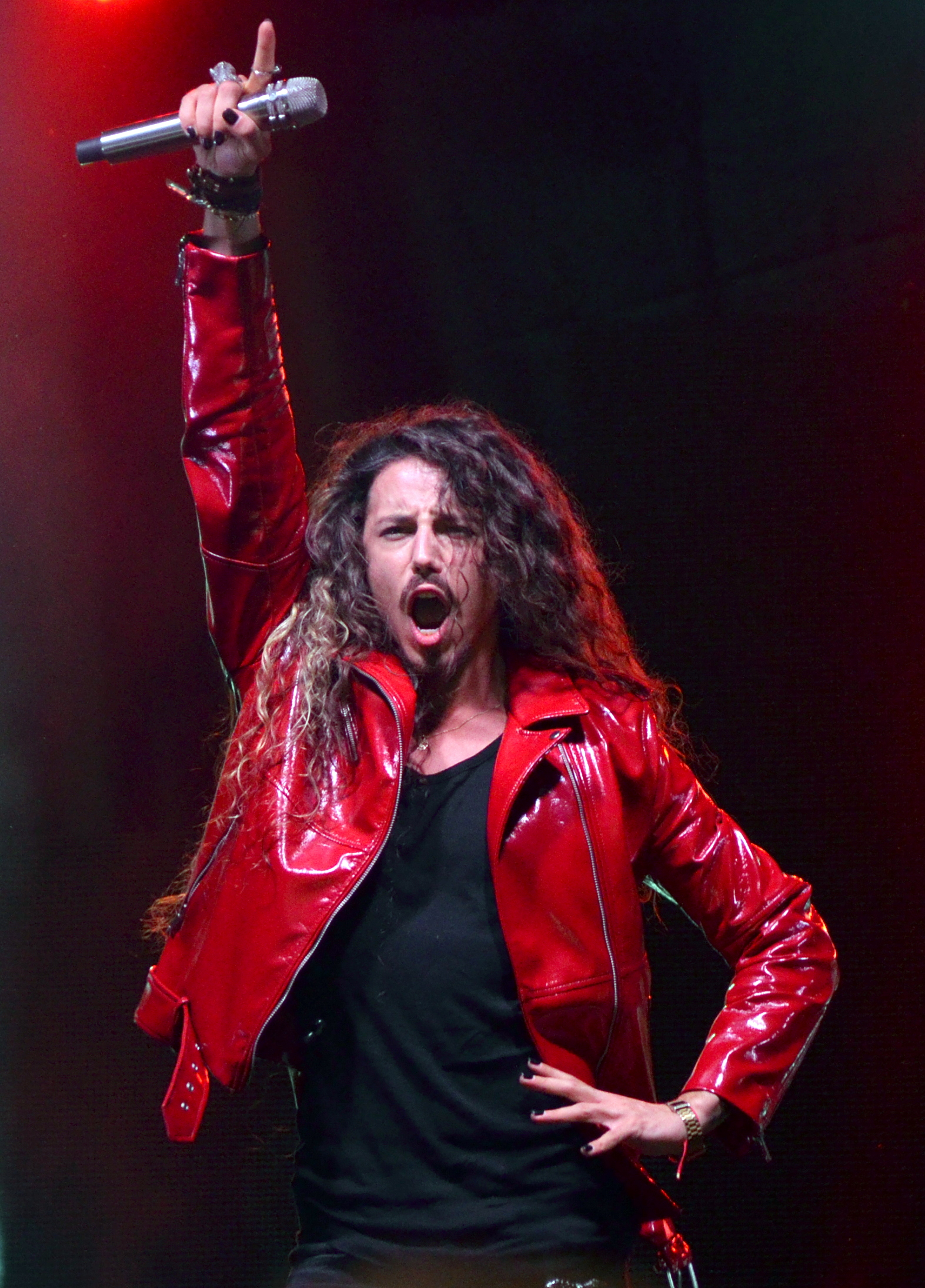
Michał Szpak

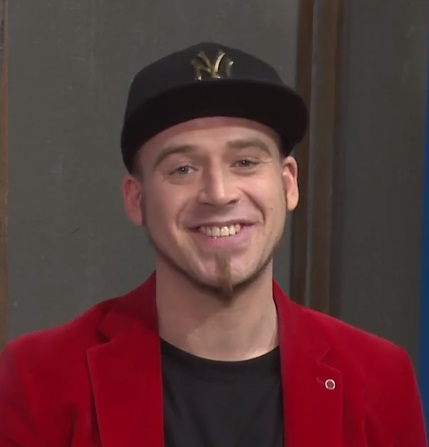
Tomasz Lach (duo)

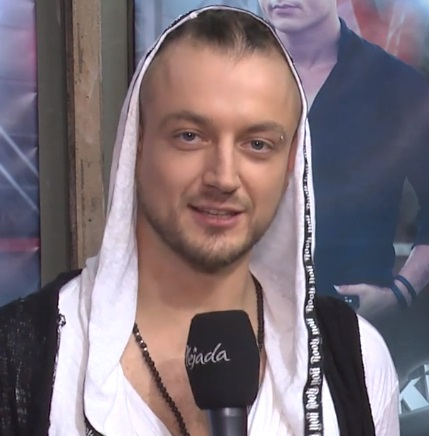
Aleksandr Milwiw-Baron (duo)

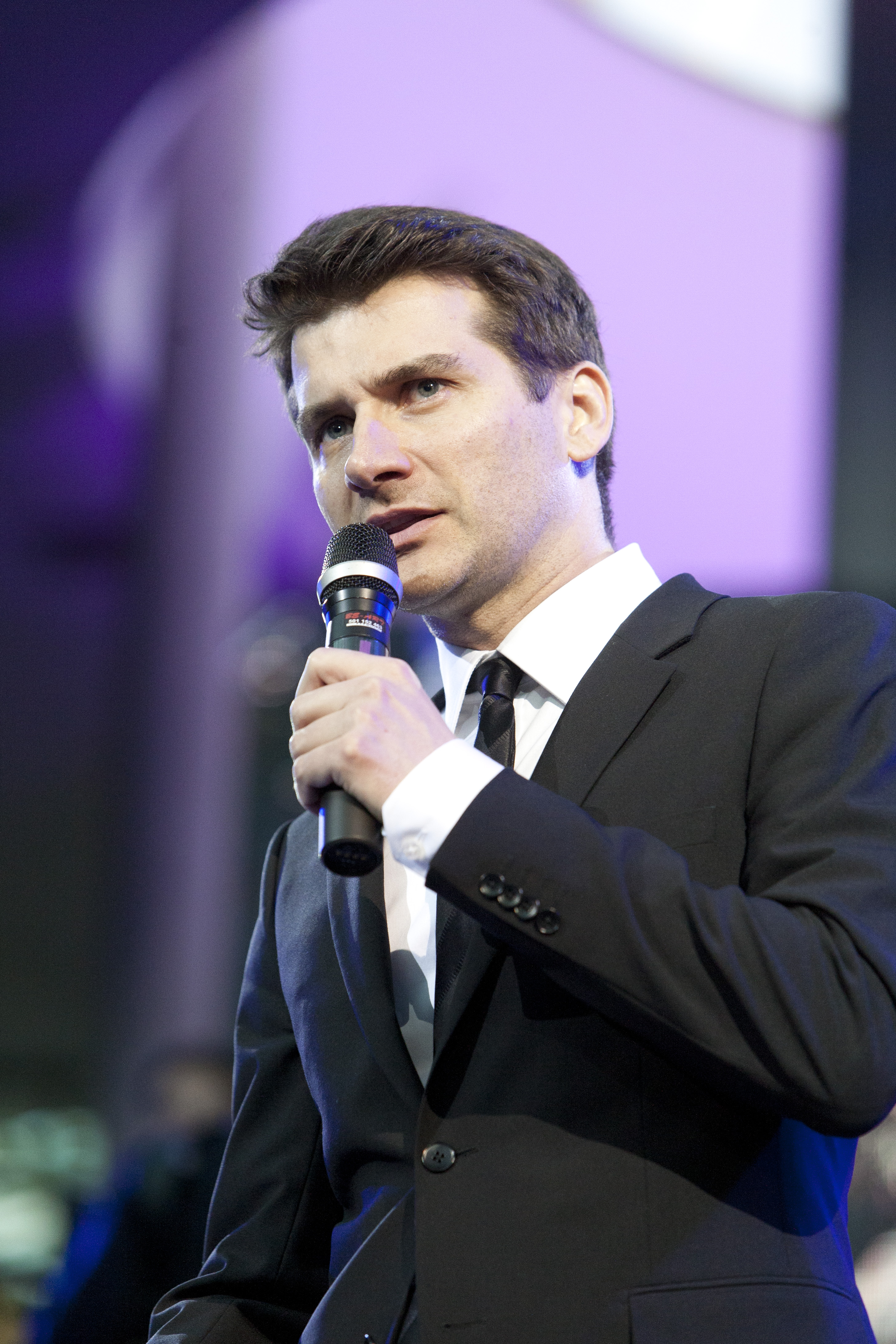
Tomasz Kammel

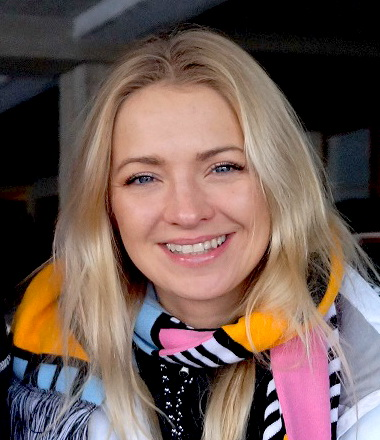
Barbara Kurdej-Szatan

== Teams ==
Color key

- Winner
- Runner-up
- Third place
- Fourth place
- Eliminated in the Semifinals
- Eliminated in the Quarterfinals
- Eliminated in the Live round
- Eliminated in the Knockout round
- Artist was stolen by another coach (Name is strikethroughed)
- Artist was stolen but was later switched with another artist and got eliminated
- Eliminated in the Battle rounds

Coaches	Top 48 artists				
Andrzej Piaseczny					
Andrzej Piaseczny	Michał Szczygieł	Artur Wołk-Lewanowicz	Martyna Pawłowska	Dave Adamashvili	Piotr Kwiatkowski
Andrzej Piaseczny	Weronika Szymańska	Emilia Lech	~~Krzysztof Płonka~~	Kacper Gołda	Adam Milczarczyk
Andrzej Piaseczny	Zosia „Zoya” Sydor	Natalia Rygiel	Damian „Struna” Surow		
Maria Sadowska					
Maria Sadowska	Maja Kapłon	Magdalena „Meg” Krzemień	Asia „Azzja” Mądry	Brian Fentress	Małgorzata Hodurek
Maria Sadowska	Dominika Pruchnicka	Volodymyr Borovskyi	~~Artur Wołk-Lewanowicz~~	Milena Szymańska	Karol Lechowski
Maria Sadowska	Joanna Karwacka	Agnieszka Seweryn	Oliwia „Lori” Lachnik		
Michał Szpak					
Michał Szpak	Marta Gałuszewska	Aga Dębowska	Jacek Wolny	Magdalena Dąbkowska	Krzysztof Płonka
Michał Szpak	Patrycja Ciborowska	Kamila Kiecoń	~~Dominika Chmielińska~~	~~Maja Kapłon~~	Joanna Banaszkiewicz
Michał Szpak	Mateusz Wiśniewski	Michał Kaim	Anna Orlova		
Tomson & Baron					
Tomson & Baron	Łukasz Łyczkowski	Sabina Musteaeva	Jelena Matula	Magdalena Janicka	Agata Gołemberska
Tomson & Baron	Damian Kikoła	Dominika Chmielińska	Agata Hylińska	Łukasz Stojko	Marta „Martita” Butryn
Tomson & Baron	Marek Molak	Abraham Kenner III	Karolina Kula		

== Blind auditions ==
Color keys

✔	Coach hit his/her "I WANT YOU" button
	Artist defaulted to this coach's team
	Artist elected to join this coach's team
	Artist eliminated with no coach pressing his or her "I WANT YOU" button

=== Episode 1 (September 2) ===
Order	Artist	Age	Song	Coach's and contestant's choices			
Order	Artist	Age	Song	Andrzej	Maria	Michał	Tomson & Baron
1	Artur Wołk-Lewanowicz	17	When I Was Your Man	✔	✔	✔	✔
2	Marek Molak	25	Are You Gonna Be My Girl	✔	✔	✔	✔
3	Sabina Mustaeva	17	Run to You	✔	✔	✔	✔
4	Maria Taciak	23	Lustra	—	—	—	—
5	Joanna Banaszkiewicz	30	Turning Tables	✔	—	✔	✔
6	Brian Fentress	35	My Love Is Your Love	✔	✔	✔	✔

=== Episode 2 (September 2) ===
Sadowska did not get any act in this episode, and this is one common episode in which the last contestant gets rejected.

Order	Artist	Age	Song	Coach's and contestant's choices			
Order	Artist	Age	Song	Andrzej	Maria	Michał	Tomson & Baron
1	Szymon Kamiński	21	Marvin Gaye	—	—	—	—
2	Zosia „Zoya” Sydor	18	Angels	✔	—	✔	—
3	Łukasz Łyczkowski	32	Wierzę w lepszy świat	✔	—	✔	✔
4	Piotr Iwaszko	41	Dawna dziewczyno	—	—	—	—
5	Michał Szczygieł	17	Sailing	✔	—	✔	—
6	Aga Dębowska	46	Dziwny jest ten świat	✔	✔	✔	✔
7	Daniel Gabryszewski	17	Fields of Gold	—	—	—	—

=== Episode 3 (September 9) ===
Order	Artist	Age	Song	Coach's and contestant's choices			
Order	Artist	Age	Song	Andrzej	Maria	Michał	Tomson & Baron
1	Arkadiusz Politowski	17	O Pani!	—	—	—	—
2	Weronika Szymańska	21	Rather Be	✔	✔	✔	—
3	Lilit Minasyan	17	Bezdroża	—	—	—	—
4	Asia „Azzja” Mądry	28	Bez Ciebie	—	✔	—	—
5	Emilia Lech	25	I Don't Wanna Lose You	✔	—	—	—
6	Magdalena Janicka	23	Cool Me Down	✔	✔	✔	✔
7	Anna Cyzon	33	Back to Black	—	—	—	—
8	Volodymyr Borovskyi	22	Perfect	✔	✔	✔	✔

=== Episode 4 (September 9) ===
Tomson & Baron did not get any acts in this episode.

Order	Artist	Age	Song	Coach's and contestant's choices			
Order	Artist	Age	Song	Andrzej	Maria	Michał	Tomson & Baron
1	Krzysztof Płonka	27	Treat You Better	✔	—	✔	—
2	Sylwia Zelek	25	Memory	—	—	—	—
3	Patrycja Ciborowska	20	Street Life	✔	—	✔	✔
4	Antonina Pawlak	18	Cisza	—	—	—	—
5	Joanna Karwacka	23	Światło nocne	✔	✔	✔	✔
6	Dave Adamashvili	23	Angie	✔	—	✔	✔
7	Marta Gałuszewska	23	I See Fire	✔	✔	✔	✔

=== Episode 5 (September 23) ===
Order	Artist	Age	Song	Coach's and contestant's choices			
Order	Artist	Age	Song	Andrzej	Maria	Michał	Tomson & Baron
1	Mateusz Wiśniewski	21	Sen o Warszawie	✔	—	✔	—
2	Paweł Pojasek	22	I Feel It Coming	—	—	—	—
3	Natalia Krzysztofik	22	Napraw	—	—	—	—
4	Agnieszka Seweryn	17	Be the One	✔	✔	—	—
5	Kirill Latosz	28	Ružica si bila	—	—	—	—
6	Agata Hylińska	39	Bed of Roses	—	✔	✔	✔
7	Staszek Plewniak	31	Million Reasons	—	—	—	—
8	Marta „Martita” Butryn	30	Believer	✔	✔	✔	✔

=== Episode 6 (September 23) ===
Order	Artist	Age	Song	Coach's and contestant's choices			
Order	Artist	Age	Song	Andrzej	Maria	Michał	Tomson & Baron
1	Katarzyna Motyka	22	Saving All My Love for You	—	—	—	—
2	Damian Kikoła	26	Dream On	—	—	✔	✔
3	Dominika Pruchnicka	17	Sign of the Times	✔	✔	✔	—
4	Adam Katryniok	36	Zaklęty krąg	—	—	—	—
5	Dominika Chmielińska	21	Lost on You	✔	—	✔	✔
6	Damian "Struna" Surow	35	Lubię wracać tam, gdzie byłem	✔	—	—	—
7	Jelena Matula	29	Bang Bang	—	—	✔	✔

=== Episode 7 (September 24) ===
Order	Artist	Age	Song	Coach's and contestant's choices			
Order	Artist	Age	Song	Andrzej	Maria	Michał	Tomson & Baron
1	Jacek Wolny	26	Riptide	✔	✔	✔	✔
2	Nikola Warda	20	Slow Hands	—	—	—	—
3	Michał Kaim	32	Tak... Tak... to ja	—	—	✔	—
4	Martyna Pawłowska	27	Sign of the Times	✔	✔	✔	✔
5	Abraham Kenner III	36	Who's Lovin' You	✔	✔	—	✔
6	Magdalena Karmiłowicz	16	Dziś już wiem	—	—	—	—
7	Piotr Kwiatkowski	40	The Show Must Go On	✔	—	✔	✔

=== Episode 8 (September 24) ===
Order	Artist	Age	Song	Coach's and contestant's choices			
Order	Artist	Age	Song	Andrzej	Maria	Michał	Tomson & Baron
1	Natalia Rygiel	23	Every Breath You Take	✔	—	—	—
2	Julia Owsiak	16	Perfect	—	—	—	—
3	Adam Milczarczyk	23	I Feel It Coming	✔	—	✔	—
4	Agnieszka Serwan	23	Porady na zdrady	—	—	—	—
5	Maja Kapłon	21	Cheap Thrills	✔	—	✔	—
6	Łukasz Stojko	30	Pastempomat	✔	—	—	✔
7	Oliwia "Lori" Lachnik	19	Lovin' You	✔	✔	✔	✔

=== Episode 9 (September 30) ===
Order	Artist	Age	Song	Coach's and contestant's choices			
Order	Artist	Age	Song	Andrzej	Maria	Michał	Tomson & Baron
1	Milena Szymańska	29	Street Life	✔	✔	✔	✔
2	Ania Waraszko	28	Lost on You	—	—	—	—
3	Kamila Kiecoń	17	Jesus to a Child	—	—	✔	✔
4	Patryk Demkowski	18	Miłość, miłość	—	—	—	—
5	Magdalena "Meg" Krzemień	26	Million Reasons	✔	✔	✔	✔
6	Karolina Kula	18	Wracam do domu	—	—	—	✔
7	Małgorzata Hodurek	21	Hurt	✔	✔	✔	✔

=== Episode 10 (September 30) ===
Order	Artist	Age	Song	Coach's and contestant's choices			
Order	Artist	Age	Song	Andrzej	Maria	Michał	Tomson & Baron
1	Agata Gołemberska	23	Malibu	✔	—	✔	✔
2	Zuzanna Niedzielska	23	Pastempomat	—	—	—	—
3	Karol Lechowski	36	Crazy Little Thing Called Love	✔	✔	—	—
4	Magdalena Dąbkowska	16	Nothing Compares 2 U	✔	—	✔	✔
5	Jagoda Ambroziak	19	Dangerous Woman	—	—	—	—
6	Kacper Gołda	19	Cisza	✔	✔	✔	✔
7	Anna Orlova	21	Ludzkie gadanie	—	—	✔	—

== The Battle Rounds ==
The same mechanics from the last season was implemented in this season's battle rounds. The winner advanced to the knockouts, while the loser is available to steal. The "hot chairs" once returned. If a coach has stolen one artist but later decides to steal another, the first artist will be replaced and eliminated by the newly-stolen artist. Same with the last season, each coach can steal up to three times. The battles therefore end with seven participants advancing to the next stage from each team, with six artists won in the battles and one stolen artist from other coaches' teams.

Color keys

Artist won the Battle and advances to the Knockouts
Artist lost the Battle but was stolen by another coach and advances to the Knockouts
Artist lost the Battle and was stolen by another coach, but was later switched with another artist and eliminated
Artist lost the Battle and was eliminated

Episode & Date	Coach	Order	Winner	Song	Loser	'Steal' result			
Episode & Date	Coach	Order	Winner	Song	Loser	Andrzej	Maria	Michał	Tomson & Baron
Episode 11 (October 7)	Tomson & Baron	1	Sabina Mustaeva	Kolorowy wiatr	Karolina Kula	—	—	—	—N/a
Episode 11 (October 7)	Michał Szpak	2	Patrycja Ciborowska	Send My Love (To Your New Lover)	Joanna Banaszkiewicz	✔	—	—N/a	—
Episode 11 (October 7)	Andrzej Piaseczny	3	Michał Szczygieł	Rude	Kacper Gołda	—N/a	—	✔	✔
Episode 11 (October 7)	Maria Sadowska	4	Volodymyr Borovskyi	Where the Wild Roses Grow	Oliwia „Lori” Lachnik	—	—N/a	—	—
Episode 11 (October 7)	Tomson & Baron	5	Magdalena Janicka	Z Tobą chcę oglądać świat	Łukasz Stojko	—	✔	✔	—N/a
Episode 11 (October 7)	Maria Sadowska	6	Magdalena „Meg” Krzemień	Break On Through (To the Other Side)	Milena Szymańska	—	—N/a	✔	—
Episode 11 (October 7)	Michał Szpak	7	Aga Dębowska	Zaopiekuj się mną	Michał Kaim	—	—	—N/a	—
Episode 11 (October 7)	Andrzej Piaseczny	8	Dave Adamashvili	I Won't Let You Go	Adam Milczarczyk	—N/a	✔	✔	✔
Episode 12 (October 14)	Tomson & Baron	1	Damian Kikoła	Whole Lotta Love	Marek Molak	—	—	—	—N/a
Episode 12 (October 14)	Maria Sadowska	2	Małgorzata Hodurek	Everything Has Changed	Artur Wołk-Lewanowicz	✔	—N/a	—	✔
Episode 12 (October 14)	Michał Szpak	3	Magdalena Dąbkowska	Ruchome piaski	Anna Orlova	—	—	—N/a	—
Episode 12 (October 14)	Andrzej Piaseczny	4	Weronika Szymańska	Chained to the Rhythm	Zosia „Zoya” Sydor	—N/a	—	—	—
Episode 12 (October 14)	Maria Sadowska	5	Dominika Pruchnicka	Prowadź mnie	Agnieszka Seweryn	—	—N/a	—	—
Episode 12 (October 14)	Michał Szpak	6	Kamila Kiecoń	Don't Dream It's Over	Mateusz Wiśniewski	—	—	—N/a	✔
Episode 12 (October 14)	Andrzej Piaseczny	7	Emilia Lech	Prócz ciebie nic	Damian „Struna” Surow	—N/a	—	—	—
Episode 12 (October 14)	Tomson & Baron	8	Jelena Matula	Another Way to Die	Abraham Kenner III	—	—	—	—N/a
Episode 13 (October 21)	Andrzej Piaseczny	1	Martyna Pawłowska	Human	Krzysztof Płonka	—N/a	—	✔	—
Episode 13 (October 21)	Tomson & Baron	2	Łukasz Łyczkowski	Come Together	Agata Hylińska	—	✔	Steal limit reached	—N/a
Episode 13 (October 21)	Maria Sadowska	3	Brian Fentress	Still Got the Blues (For You)	Karol Lechowski	—	—N/a	Steal limit reached	—
Episode 13 (October 21)	Andrzej Piaseczny	4	Piotr Kwiatkowski	Królowa Łez	Natalia Rygiel	—N/a	—	Steal limit reached	—
Episode 13 (October 21)	Michał Szpak	5	Marta Gałuszewska	Bad Romance	Dominika Chmielińska	—	—	Steal limit reached	✔
Episode 13 (October 21)	Maria Sadowska	6	Asia „Azzja” Mądry	Na językach	Joanna Karwacka	—	—N/a	Steal limit reached	Steal limit reached
Episode 13 (October 21)	Tomson & Baron	7	Agata Gołemberska	Elastic Heart	Marta „Martita” Butryn	—	—	Steal limit reached	Steal limit reached
Episode 13 (October 21)	Michał Szpak	8	Jacek Wolny	Beneath Your Beautiful	Maja Kapłon	—	✔	Steal limit reached	Steal limit reached

== The Knockout Round ==
=== Episode 14 (October 28) ===
Knockouts took place on 28 October 2017.

Color keys

Contestant was not switched out and advanced to the Live Shows
Contestant was eliminated, either immediately (indicated by a "—" in the "Switched with" column) or switched with another contestant

Coach	Order	Artist	Song	Result	Switched with
Tomson & Baron	1	Damian Kikoła	Should I Stay or Should I Go	Eliminated	N/A
Tomson & Baron	2	Agata Gołemberska	You Know I'm No Good	Eliminated	N/A
Tomson & Baron	3	Dominika Chmielińska	Winna	Eliminated	N/A
Tomson & Baron	4	Sabina Mustaeva	Halo	Advanced	N/A
Tomson & Baron	5	Łukasz Łyczkowski	Sen o Victorii	Advanced	Damian Kikoła
Tomson & Baron	6	Magdalena Janicka	Domino	Advanced	Dominika Chmielińska
Tomson & Baron	7	Jelena Matula	Addicted to You	Advanced	Agata Gołemberska
Maria Sadowska	1	Volodymyr Borovskyi	Like I'm Gonna Lose You	Eliminated	N/A
Maria Sadowska	2	Dominika Pruchnicka	Nie proszę o więcej	Eliminated	N/A
Maria Sadowska	3	Małgorzata Hodurek	One and Only	Eliminated	N/A
Maria Sadowska	4	Asia „Azzja” Mądry	Nigdy więcej nie tańcz ze mną	Advanced	N/A
Maria Sadowska	5	Maja Kapłon	Jak rzecz	Advanced	Dominika Pruchnicka
Maria Sadowska	6	Magdalena „Meg” Krzemień	Za późno	Advanced	Volodymyr Borovskyi
Maria Sadowska	7	Brian Fentress	All of Me	Advanced	Małgorzata Hodurek
Andrzej Piaseczny	1	Emilia Lech	Shake It Off	Eliminated	N/A
Andrzej Piaseczny	2	Martyna Pawłowska	Love on the Brain	Advanced	N/A
Andrzej Piaseczny	3	Michał Szczygieł	Dni, których nie znamy	Advanced	N/A
Andrzej Piaseczny	4	Piotr Kwiatkowski	When a Man Loves a Woman	Eliminated	N/A
Andrzej Piaseczny	5	Artur Wołk-Lewanowicz	7 Years	Advanced	Emilia Lech
Andrzej Piaseczny	6	Weronika Szymańska	Na sen	Eliminated	—
Andrzej Piaseczny	7	Dave Adamashvili	Wish You Were Here	Advanced	Piotr Kwiatkowski
Michał Szpak	1	Patrycja Ciborowska	Get a Job	Eliminated	N/A
Michał Szpak	2	Marta Gałuszewska	Give Me Love	Advanced	N/A
Michał Szpak	3	Kamila Kiecoń	Flirt	Eliminated	N/A
Michał Szpak	4	Aga Dębowska	Co mi Panie dasz	Advanced	N/A
Michał Szpak	5	Jacek Wolny	Creep	Advanced	Patrycja Ciborowska
Michał Szpak	6	Magdalena Dąbkowska	Dłoń	Advanced	Kamila Kiecoń
Michał Szpak	7	Krzysztof Płonka	Wonderwall	Eliminated	—

== Live Shows ==
Color keys

Artist was saved by Public's vote
Artist was saved by his/her coach
Artist was eliminated

=== Episode 15 (November 4) ===
Order	Coach	Artist	Song	Result
1	Tomson & Baron	Jelena Matula	Queen of the Night	Tomson & Baron's Choice
2	Tomson & Baron	Magdalena Janicka	Frozen	Eliminated
3	Tomson & Baron	Sabina Mustaeva	Dangerous Woman	Public vote
4	Tomson & Baron	Łukasz Łyczkowski	Nie widzę ciebie w swych marzeniach	Public vote
1	Andrzej Piaseczny	Artur Wołk-Lewanowicz	One More Try	Public vote
2	Andrzej Piaseczny	Dave Adamashvili	Learning to Fly	Eliminated
3	Andrzej Piaseczny	Martyna Pawłowska	What About Us	Andrzej's Choice
4	Andrzej Piaseczny	Michał Szczygieł	Atom miłości	Public vote
1	Maria Sadowska	Asia „Azzja” Mądry	Hey Mama	Maria's Choice
2	Maria Sadowska	Magdalena „Meg” Krzemień	Sutra	Public vote
3	Maria Sadowska	Brian Fentress	Love On Top	Eliminated
4	Maria Sadowska	Maja Kapłon	The Winner Takes It All	Public vote
1	Michał Szpak	Magdalena Dąbkowska	Sztorm	Eliminated
2	Michał Szpak	Jacek Wolny	Don't Look Back in Anger	Michał's Choice
3	Michał Szpak	Aga Dębowska	Proud Mary	Public vote
4	Michał Szpak	Marta Gałuszewska	Run Baby Run	Public vote

Non-competition performances
Order	Performers	Song
1	Natalia Nykiel	Total błękit

=== Episode 16 - Quarter-Final (November 11) ===
Order	Coach	Artist	Song	Result
1	Andrzej Piaseczny	Martyna Pawłowska	Gołębi puch	Eliminated
2	Andrzej Piaseczny	Artur Wołk-Lewanowicz	Noc i dzień	Andrzej's Choice
3	Andrzej Piaseczny	Michał Szczygieł	The Lazy Song	Public vote
1	Michał Szpak	Jacek Wolny	Dla Ciebie	Eliminated
2	Michał Szpak	Marta Gałuszewska	Symphony	Public vote
3	Michał Szpak	Aga Dębowska	Cykady na Cykladach	Michał's Choice
1	Maria Sadowska	Magdalena „Meg” Krzemień	Empire State of Mind (Part II) Broken Down	Maria's Choice
2	Maria Sadowska	Maja Kapłon	Miłość Miłość	Public vote
3	Maria Sadowska	Asia „Azzja” Mądry	Smooth Operator	Eliminated
1	Tomson & Baron	Sabina Musteaeva	Think	Tomson & Baron's Choice
2	Tomson & Baron	Łukasz Łyczkowski	Little Wing	Public vote
3	Tomson & Baron	Jelena Matula	It's a Man's Man's Man's World	Eliminated

Non-competition performances
Order	Performers	Song
1	Andrzej Piaseczny	Rock with You
2	Michał Szpak	Can You Feel the Love Tonight
3	Sarsa	Motyle i ćmy
4	Maria Sadowska	I'm Every Woman
5	Tomson & Baron	The Pretender

=== Episode 17 - Semifinal (18 November) ===
Order	Coach	Artist	Original song	Cover song	Finalist's song	Points			Result
Order	Coach	Artist	Original song	Cover song	Finalist's song	Coach	Public	Total	Result
1	Maria Sadowska	Magdalena „Meg” Krzemień	Bieg	Waiting All Night	—N/a	57%	34%	91%	Eliminated
2	Maria Sadowska	Maja Kapłon	Plaża nad Wisłą	Shape of You	Jak rzecz	43%	66%	109%	Advanced to the Final
1	Tomson & Baron	Sabina Musteaeva	To już	Euphoria	—N/a	55%	24%	79%	Eliminated
2	Tomson & Baron	Łukasz Łyczkowski	To jest mój rock'n'roll	Imagine	Wierzę w lepszy świat	45%	76%	121%	Advanced to the Final
1	Michał Szpak	Marta Gałuszewska	Nie mów mi nie	Tatuaż	I See Fire	55%	56%	111%	Advanced to the Final
2	Michał Szpak	Aga Dębowska	Możesz	(You Make Me Feel Like) A Natural Woman	—N/a	45%	44%	89%	Eliminated
1	Andrzej Piaseczny	Artur Wołk-Lewanowicz	Mgła	King	—N/a	51%	39%	90%	Eliminated
2	Andrzej Piaseczny	Michał Szczygieł	Nic tu po mnie	Hold Back The River	Dni, których nie znamy	49%	61%	110%	Advanced to the Final

Non-competition performances
Order	Performers	Song
1	Natalia Kukulska	Halo Tu Ziemia
2	Jonas Blue	We Could Go Back / Perfect Strangers

=== Episode 18 - Final (November 25) ===
Result details

- Winner
- Runner-up
- Third place
- Fourth Place

Order	Coach	Artist	Song		Result
1	Tomson & Baron	Łukasz Łyczkowski	Solo song	Sweet Child o' Mine	Runner-up
1	Tomson & Baron	Łukasz Łyczkowski	Duet with coach	I Still Haven't Found What I'm Looking For	Runner-up
1	Tomson & Baron	Łukasz Łyczkowski	Top 3 song	Jednego serca	Runner-up
1	Tomson & Baron	Łukasz Łyczkowski	Finalist's song	To jest mój rock'n'roll	Runner-up
2	Maria Sadowska	Maja Kapłon	Solo song	Bleeding Love	Fourth Place
2	Maria Sadowska	Maja Kapłon	Duet with coach	W co mam wierzyć?	Fourth Place
2	Maria Sadowska	Maja Kapłon	Top 3 song	—N/a	Fourth Place
2	Maria Sadowska	Maja Kapłon	Finalist's song	—N/a	Fourth Place
3	Andrzej Piaseczny	Michał Szczygieł	Solo song	Two Princes	Third place
3	Andrzej Piaseczny	Michał Szczygieł	Duet with coach	Da Ya Think I'm Sexy?	Third place
3	Andrzej Piaseczny	Michał Szczygieł	Top 3 song	Bóg	Third place
3	Andrzej Piaseczny	Michał Szczygieł	Finalist's song	—N/a	Third place
4	Michał Szpak	Marta Gałuszewska	Solo song	Jolene	Winner
4	Michał Szpak	Marta Gałuszewska	Duet with coach	Don't Poison Your Heart	Winner
4	Michał Szpak	Marta Gałuszewska	Top 3 song	Zanim zrozumiesz	Winner
4	Michał Szpak	Marta Gałuszewska	Finalist's song	Nie mów mi nie	Winner

Non-competition performances
Order	Performers	Song
1	Jessie Ware and the finalists	Say You Love Me
2	Mateusz Grędziński	Już czas
3	The finalists	The Star
4	Edyta Górniak	Andromeda
5	Jessie Ware	Alone

== Results summary of live shows ==
Color keys
Artist's info

- Artist from Team Tomson & Baron
- Artist from Team Maria Sadowska
- Artist from Team Michał Szpak
- Artist from Team Andrzej Piaseczny

Result details

- Artist was proclaimed as winner
- Artist was proclaimed as runner-up
- Artist was proclaimed as third place
- Artist was proclaimed as fourth place
- Artist advanced to the finals
- Artist was saved by his/her coach
- Artist was saved by the public
- Artist received the fewest accumulated total points and was eliminated
- Artist received the fewest of the public's vote and was eliminated

Live show results per week
Artist	Week 1	Week 2	Week 3	Finals
Marta Gałuszewska	Safe	Safe	Advanced	Winner
Łukasz Łyczkowski	Safe	Safe	Advanced	Runner-up
Michał Szczygieł	Safe	Safe	Advanced	3rd Place
Maja Kapłon	Safe	Safe	Advanced	4th Place
Aga Dębowska	Safe	Safe	Eliminated	Eliminated (Week 3)
Magdalena „Meg” Krzemień	Safe	Safe	Eliminated	Eliminated (Week 3)
Artur Wołk-Lewanowicz	Safe	Safe	Eliminated	Eliminated (Week 3)
Sabina Musteaeva	Safe	Safe	Eliminated	Eliminated (Week 3)
Jelena Matula	Safe	Eliminated	Eliminated (Week 2)	
Asia „Azzja” Mądry	Safe	Eliminated	Eliminated (Week 2)	
Jacek Wolny	Safe	Eliminated	Eliminated (Week 2)	
Martyna Pawłowska	Safe	Eliminated	Eliminated (Week 2)	
Magdalena Dąbkowska	Eliminated	Eliminated (Week 1)		
Brian Fentress	Eliminated	Eliminated (Week 1)		
Dave Adamashvili	Eliminated	Eliminated (Week 1)		
Magdalena Janicka	Eliminated	Eliminated (Week 1)		

=== Team ===
Artist's info

- Artist from Team Andrzej Piaseczny
- Artist from Team Maria Sadowska
- Artist from Team Michał Szpak
- Artist from Team Tomson & Baron

Result details

- Winner
- Runner-up
- Third place
- Fourth Place
- Artist advanced to the finals
- Artist was saved by his/her coach
- Artist was saved by public
- Artist was eliminated

Live show results per week
Artist	Live Shows			
Artist	Week 1	Week 2	Week 3	Finals
Michał Szczygieł	Public's vote	Public's vote	Advanced Finals	Third place
Artur Wołk-Lewanowicz	Public's vote	Coach's choice	Eliminated	
Martyna Pawłowska	Coach's choice	Eliminated		
Dave Adamashvili	Eliminated			
Maja Kapłon	Public's vote	Public's vote	Advanced Finals	Fourth Place
Magdalena „Meg” Krzemień	Public's vote	Coach's choice	Eliminated	
Asia „Azzja” Mądry	Coach's choice	Eliminated		
Brian Fentress	Eliminated			
Marta Gałuszewska	Public's vote	Public's vote	Advanced Finals	Winner
Aga Dębowska	Public's vote	Coach's choice	Eliminated	
Jacek Wolny	Coach's choice	Eliminated		
Magdalena Dąbkowska	Eliminated			
Łukasz Łyczkowski	Public's vote	Public's vote	Advanced Finals	Runner-up
Sabina Musteaeva	Public's vote	Coach's choice	Eliminated	
Jelena Matula	Coach's choice	Eliminated		
Magdalena Janicka	Eliminated			
