= Daria (singer) =

Polish singer and songwriter (born 1995)

Daria Marx
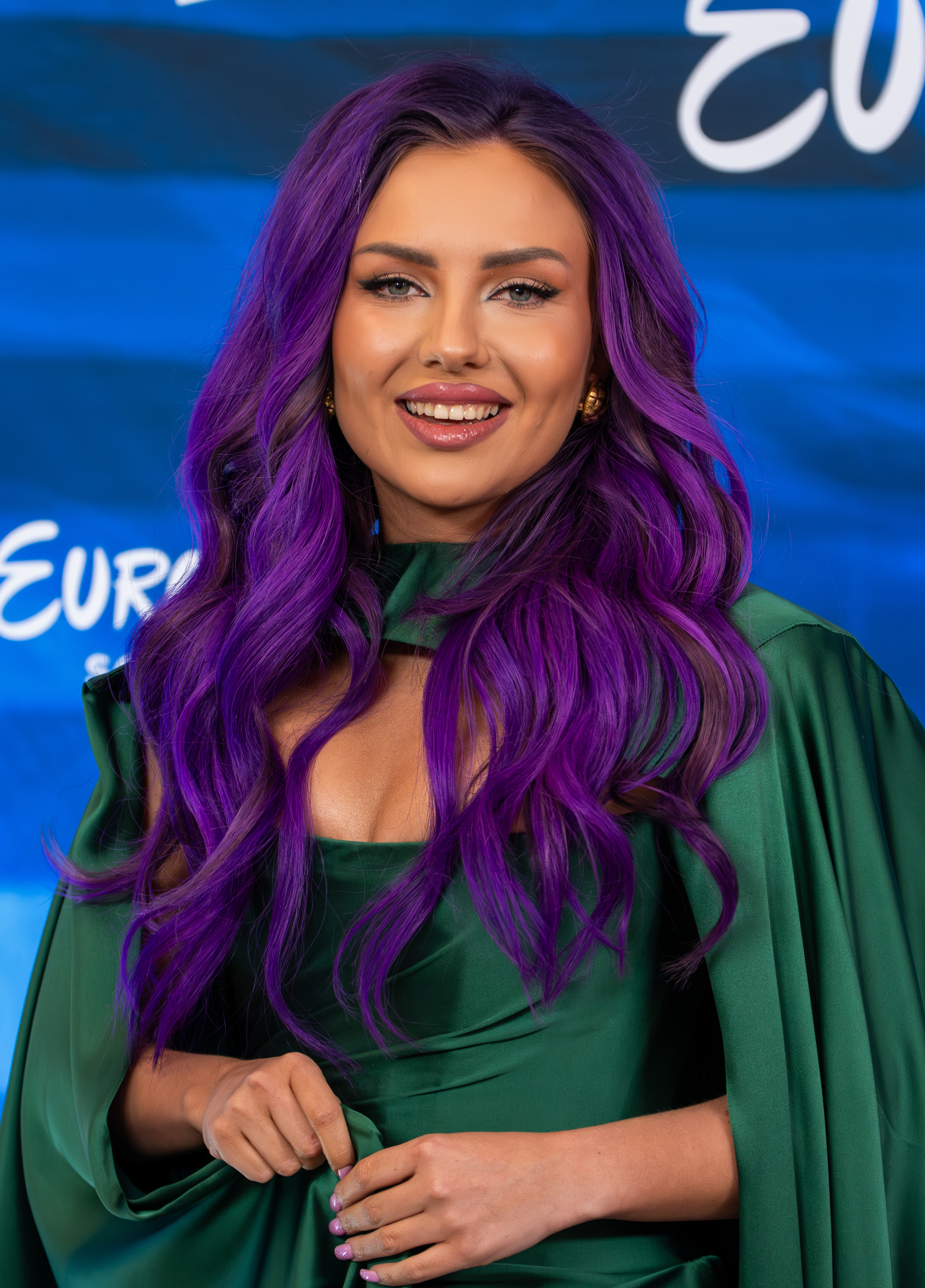
- Daria in 2025

Background information
- Also known as: Daria Marx
- Born: Daria Marcinkowska; 25 October 1995 (age 31); Mikołów, Poland
- Genres: Pop; electronic
- Occupations: Singer; songwriter; record producer
- Years active: 2020–present
- Label: Pelican Songs

Daria Marcinkowska (born 25 October 1995), better known as Daria Marx, is a Polish singer, songwriter and record producer.

== Early life and education ==
Daria Marcinkowska was born on 25 October 1995 in Mikołów and comes from Łaziska Górne. At the age of seven, she enrolled in the church choir. At the age of 18, she went to London to study for five years at the London College of Music. While studying, she sang, among others, in front of the Swedish royal family.

== Musical career ==
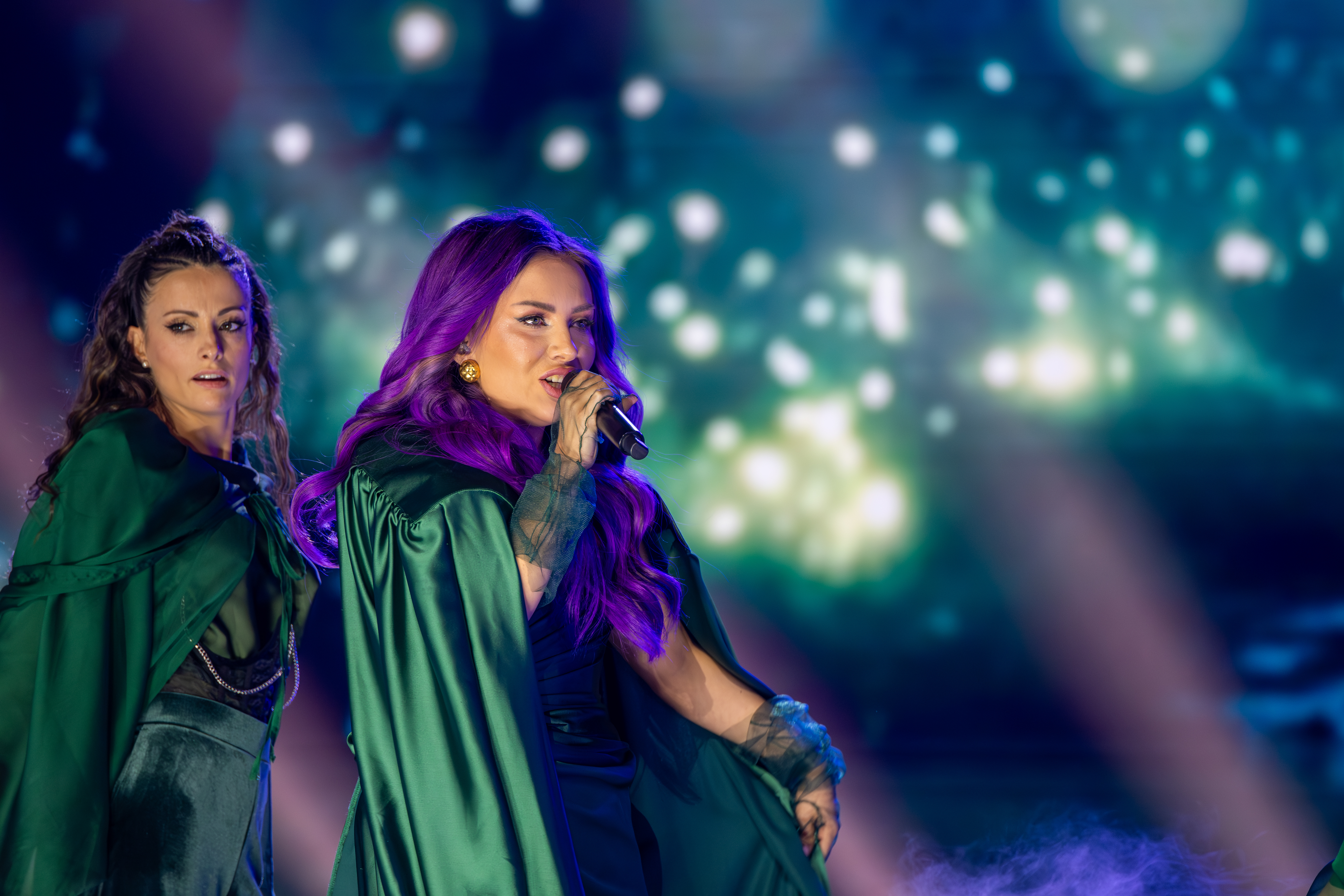
Daria Marx during the final of Wielki finał polskich kwalifikacji.

In autumn 2019, Daria participated in the 10th season of the TVP 2 talent show The Voice of Poland, where she was eliminated during the Battle Rounds. After participating in the program, she signed a recording contract with the German label Pelican Songs. In April 2020, she released the single "Leave a Sign", which she recorded with Carsky.

On 26 March 2021, Daria released the song "Love Blind", which reached the Polish charts and also entered the streaming lists, in Brazil, Norway and Belgium. On 8 October, she released the single "Paranoia", which topped Poland's AirPlay - Top chart and was also played many times on Russian and Macedonian radio stations. On 19 February 2022, Daria performed this song in the TVP2 program Tu bije serce Europy! Wybieramy hit na Eurowizję! and finished in second place. On 25 March, with the DJ duo Kush Kush, she released the single "Never Ending Story", which reached the first place on the AirPlay - Top chart. In spring 2023, she finished in second place in the final of the 18th season of the entertainment program Twoja twarz brzmi znajomo on Polsat.

In January 2025, Daria, under the stage name Daria Marx, was announced as a finalist of the Wielki finał polskich kwalifikacji, the Polish national final for the Eurovision Song Contest 2025 with the song "Let It Burn", where she finished in 11th and last place the following month.

== Discography ==
=== Singles ===
As lead artist

Year	Title	Peak chart positions			Certification	Sales	Album
Year	Title	POL			Certification	Sales	Album
Year	Title	AirPlay	AirPlay Nowości	AirPlay TV	Certification	Sales	Album
2021	"Love Blind"	5	5	2	POL: Gold	POL: 25,000+	Non-album singles
2021	"Paranoia"	1	2	2	POL: 3× Platinum	POL: 150,000+	Non-album singles
2022	"Never Ending Story" (featuring Kush Kush)	1	1	1	POL: Gold	POL: 25,000+	Non-album singles
2022	"Lowkey" (featuring Pelican)	–	–	–			Non-album singles
2023	"Truth"	11	X				Non-album singles
2023	"Bad Pattern"	–	X				Non-album singles
2023	"Feelings"	10	X				Non-album singles
2024	"Va Banque" (featuring Julia Żugaj)	–	X				Non-album singles
2024	"Gave You My Heart"	–	X				Non-album singles
2024	"Prince Charming"	–	X				Non-album singles
2025	"Let It Burn"	–	X				Non-album singles
"–" denotes a recording that did not chart or was not released in that territory. "X" denotes that the list did not exist at that time.

As featured artist

Year	Title	Album
2020	"Leave a Sign" (Carsky, featuring Daria Marx)	–
