= Patrycja Markowska =

Polish pop rock singer (born 1979)

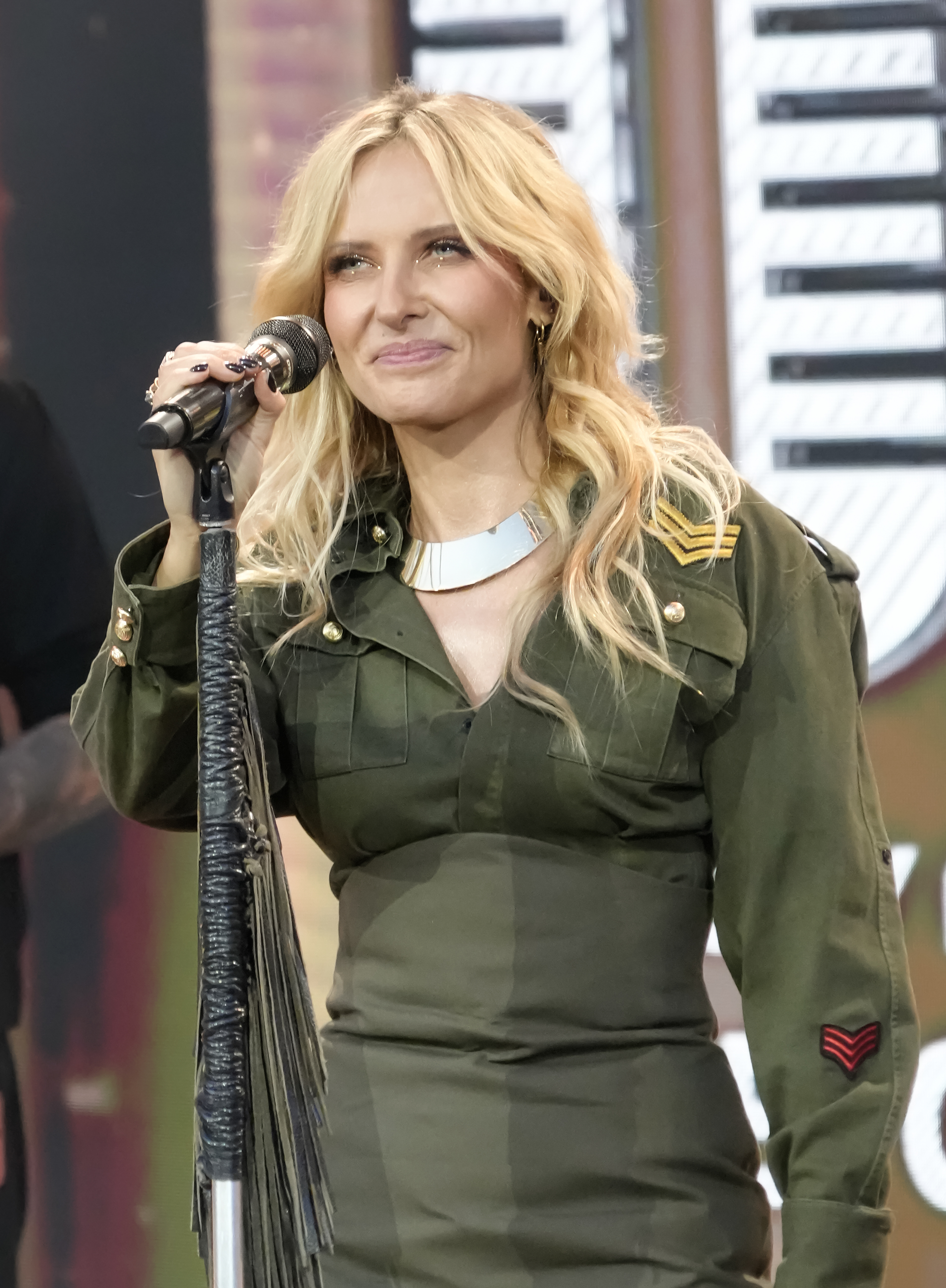
- Patrycja Markowska (2025)
- Born: 21 December 1979 (age 46); Warsaw, Poland
- Occupation: Singer
- Spouse: Jacek Kopczyński
- Children: 1
- Parent(s): Grzegorz Markowski; Krystyna Markowska
- Musical career
- Genres: Pop Rock, Rock, Power Ballad, Adult Contemporary
- Years active: 2000–present
- Labels: Universal Music Poland, Metal Mind Productions, EMI Music Poland
- Website: www.patrycjamarkowska.com

Patrycja Markowska (born 21 December 1979, Warsaw) is a Polish pop rock singer.

She was the winner of the television contest Odkrywamy talenty (Discovering Talents) in 1994. Markowska has released nine studio albums: Będę silna (2001), Mój czas (2003), Nie zatrzyma nikt (2005), Świat się pomylił (2007), Patrycja Markowska (2010), Alter Ego (2013), Krótka płyta o miłości (2017), Droga (2019; recorded with Grzegorz Markowski), and Wilczy pęd (2022). She has received two platinum records and one gold record. Some of her biggest hits include Świat się pomylił, Jeszcze raz, Księżycowy, Hallo, hallo, Ostatni, Ocean, Lustro, and Niepoprawna.

She won the "Premier" contest at the 44th National Festival of Polish Song in Opole 2007. In 2008 she received the Eska Music Awards in the Artist of the Year category, performed a concert before Nelly Furtado in Poznań, and released a reissue of the album Świat się pomylił, enriched with the hit song Deszcz. Markowska has also been a juror or participant in several television entertainment programs.

== Career ==
She was a coach on seasons 2 and 9 of The Voice of Poland.

== Discography ==
=== Studio albums ===
Title	Album details	Peak chart positions	Sales	Certifications
Title	Album details	POL	Sales	Certifications
Będę silna	Released: December 3, 2001; Label: Universal Music Poland; Formats: CD, digital download	—		
Mój czas	Released: October 16, 2003; Label: Universal Music Poland; Formats: CD, digital download	38		
Nie zatrzyma nikt	Released: October 17, 2005; Label: Universal Music Poland; Formats: CD, digital download	17		
Świat się pomylił	Released: October 1, 2007; Label: EMI Music Poland; Formats: CD, CD+DVD, digital download	5	POL: 30,000+	POL: Platinum
Patrycja Markowska	Released: October 25, 2010; Label: EMI Music Poland; Formats: CD, CD+DVD, digital download	9	POL: 30,000+	POL: Platinum
Alter Ego	Released: May 28, 2013; Label: EMI Music Poland; Formats: CD, digital download	9		
"—" denotes a recording that did not chart or was not released in that territory.

=== Live albums ===
Title	Album details
Patrycja Markowska Na Żywo	Released: April 13, 2015; Label: J&J Music Art; Formats: CD

=== Video albums ===
Title	Album details
Patrycja Markowska Live	Released: June 25, 2007; Label: Metal Mind Productions; Formats: DVD
