= Alfa Future People Festival =

Annual electronic music festival in Bolshoye Kozino, Russia

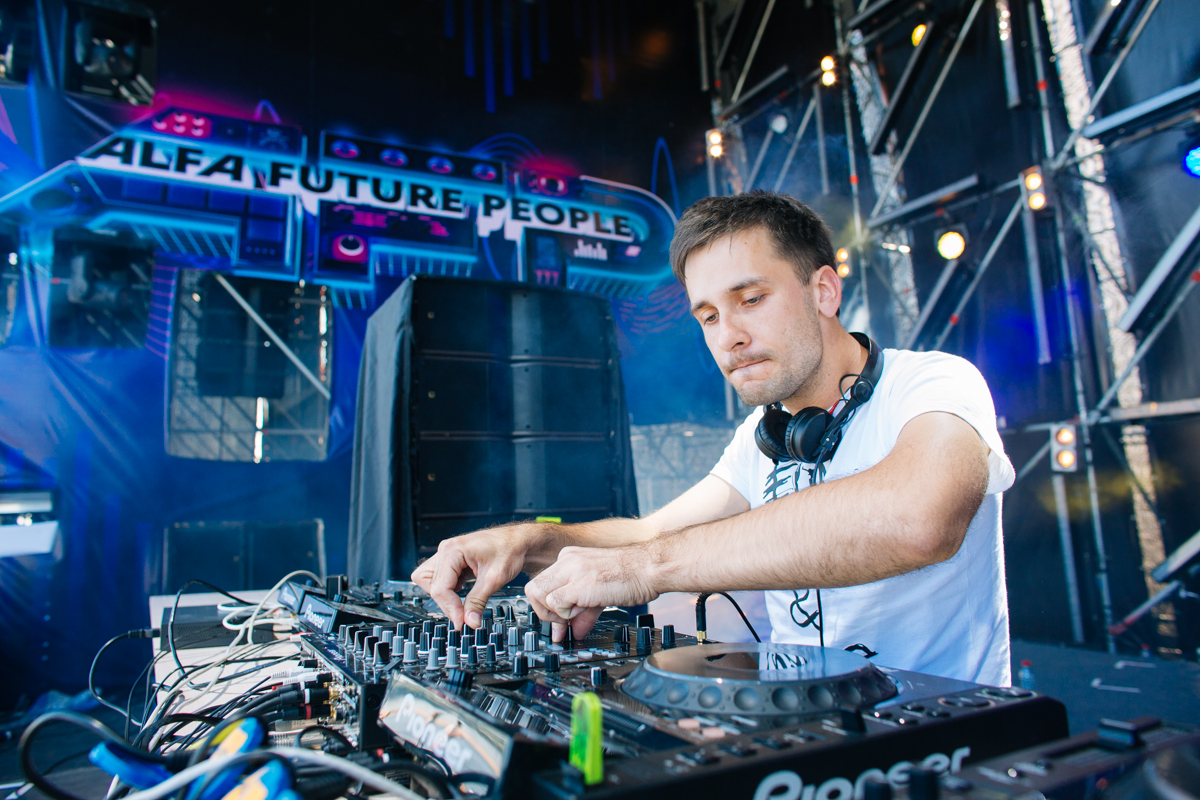
- Genre: Electronic dance sic
- Dates: Final weekend of July and December
- Locations: Bolshoye Kozino, Nizhny Novgorod Oblast, Russia, Kuznetzovo.
- Years active: 2014-2019
- Organiser: Alfa-Bank
- Website: Official website

Alfa Future People Festival is an electronic music festival held in the Russian town Bolshoye Kozino near the city Nizhny Novgorod, every summer from 2014 to 2019.

The festival was started in 2014 by genre Electronic dance music including Hardstyle, Trance and Dubstep. In addition to the podiums there are multiple sports events that will be held at the festival territory like Volleyball, Yoga and Physical fitness, and other various outdoor activities. Since 2019, a “Snow Edition” of the festival is planned to be held during winter/early spring, in Rosa Khutor ski resort, in smaller scale (with limited line up) but similarly merging both dance music and outdoor activities.

== Line up by edition ==
Year	Location	Date	Headliners
2019	Bolshoye Kozino, Russia	16–18 August	Expected: Coone, Showtek, Jeffrey Sutorius (Dash Berlin)
2019 (Snow Edition)	Rosa Khutor ski resort, Russia	22–24 March	Expected: Chase & Status DJ Set, Shanguy, Kush Kush, Vanotek
2018	Bolshoye Kozino, Russia	10–12 August	Afrojack, Alesso, Aly & Fila, Aphrodite, DVBBS, Gareth Emery, Going Deeper, Infected Mushroom DJ Set, KSHMR, Steve Aoki, Swanky Tunes, Tiësto, Vini Vici, Yellow Claw
2017	Bolshoye Kozino, Russia	7–8 July	Hardwell, Blasterjaxx, Dyro, Don Diablo, W&W, Malaa, Swanky Tunes, Pendulum, Nervo, Oliver Heldens
2016	Bolshoye Kozino, Russia	22–24 July	Dimitri Vegas & Like Mike, Axwell & Sebastian Ingrosso, Armin van Buuren, Martin Garrix, W&W, Lost Frequencies, Brennan Heart, Infected Mushroom
2015	Bolshoye Kozino, Russia	17–19 July	Arty, Booka Shade, Borgore, Deadmau5, DJ Snake, DJ Feel, Efim Kerbut, Knife Party, Matisse & Sadko, Nero, Netsky, Paul van Dyk, Sander Van Doorn, Steve Angello, Underworld
2014	Bolshoye Kozino, Russia	11–13 July	Arty, ATB, Avicii, Benny Benassi, Efim Kerbut, John Dahlback, Markus Schulz, Nero, Paul Oakenfold, Infected Mushroom, Skrillex

== See also ==
- List of electronic music festivals
- List of festivals in Russia
