= Piotr Cugowski =

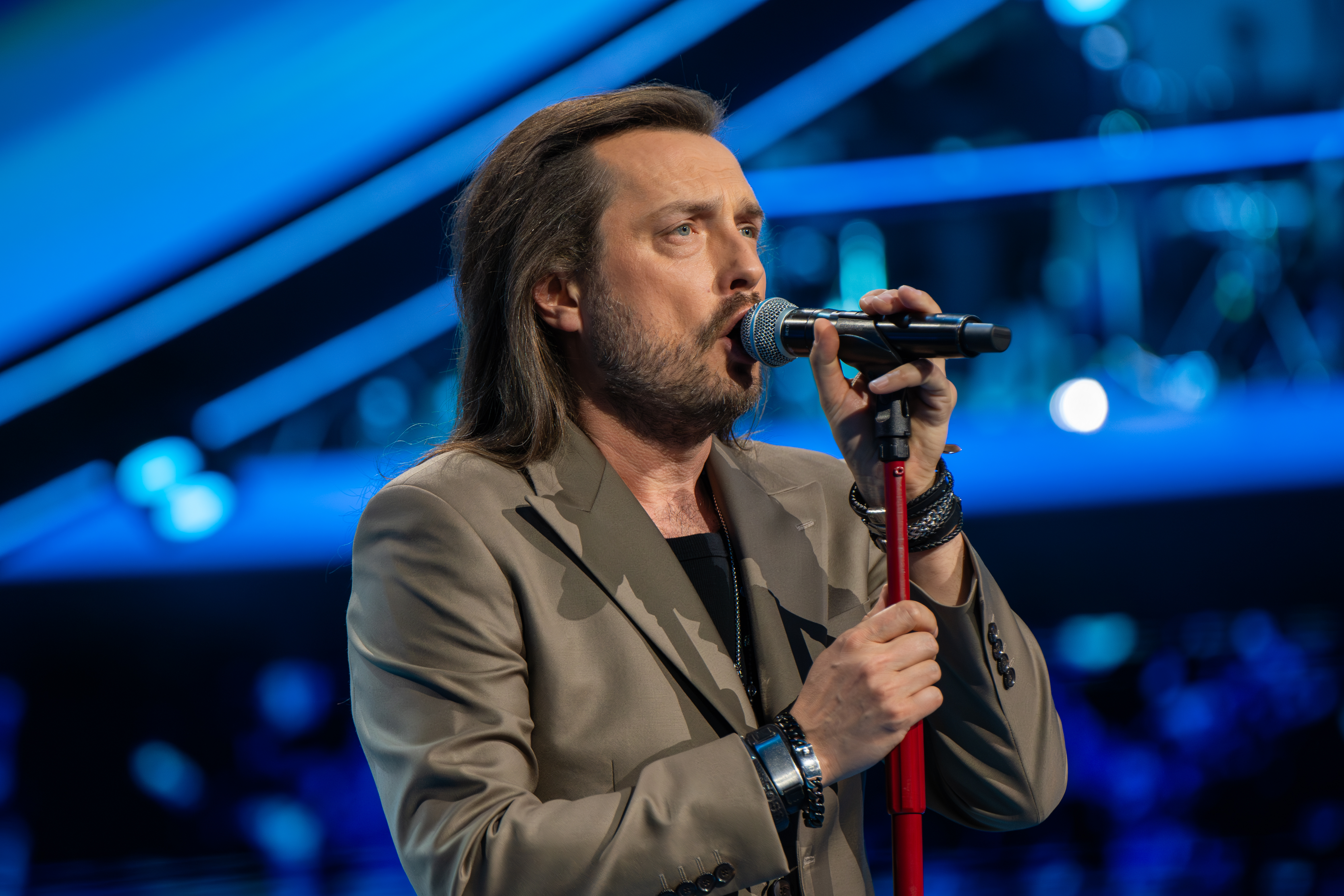
- Cugowski in 2025
- Born: 5 October 1979 (age 47); Lublin, Poland
- Occupations: singer, songwriter, music producer
- Parent: Krzysztof Cugowski
- Musical career
- Years active: 1997–present
- Labels: Rock House Entertainment, Sony Music Entertainment Poland

Piotr Cugowski (born 5 October 1979) is a Polish musician. He is the vocalist of the Bracia Group, which he founded together with his brother Wojciech. He comes from a musical family, being the son of Krzysztof Cugowski, who is the founder of a well-known Polish 1970s rock band Budka Suflera. Piotr Cugowski is a member of the Polish Society of the Phonographic Industry.

== Life and career ==
Piotr Cugowski was born on 5 October 1979 in Lublin. He began his musical career in 1997. A breakthrough came in 2002 when he won the main prize at the Festival in Zielona Góra for his performance of the song by Czesław Niemen entitled "One heart", (Polish: "Jednego serca"). The most famous songs which Piotr Cugowski performed with his band Bracia include: "Za szkłem", "Nad Przepaścią", "Wierzę w lepszy świat" and "Po drugiej stronie chmur".

For the past three years (2015 to 2018) Piotr Cugowski and his brother Wojciech Cugowski (guitar, vocal) together with their father Krzysztof Cugowski created the Cugowski music project. They gave hundreds of concerts throughout Poland promoting the common album "Cugowscy".

In September 2018 Piotr Cugowski debuted in the role of juror in the ninth season of The Voice of Poland. He will release his first solo album for his 40th birthday in 2019. The first single from the album titled "Kto nie kochal" (English: "Who never loved") premiered in Poland on October 23, 2018.

On 18 August 2021, it was announced that he will appear in the third season of The Voice Senior as a coach, replacing Andrzej Piaseczny.

== Discography ==
- Bracia (Cugowscy) - Zmienić zdarzeń bieg (2013)
- Bracia (Cugowscy) - Missing Every Moment (2003)
- Bracia (Cugowscy) - Nie jestem inny (2002)
- Cugowscy - Zaklęty krąg (2016)
- Bracia (Cugowscy) - Zmienić zdarzeń bieg (2015)
- Bracia (Cugowscy) - Zapamiętaj (2009)
- Bracia (Cugowscy) - Kolędy (2009)
- Bracia (Cugowscy) - You Don't Fool Me (2008)
- Bracia (Cugowscy) - Szara twarz (2004)
- Bracia (Cugowscy) - Niczego więcej (2004)
- Bracia (Cugowscy) - Jeszcze raz (2007)
- Seweryn Krajewski - Jak tam jest (2011)
- Bracia (Cugowscy) - Tribute to Queen (2008)
- Martyna Jakubowicz - 30-te urodziny (2008)
- Bracia (Cugowscy) - Fobrock (2005)
- Bracia (Cugowscy) - Dzieci wszystkich gwiazd (2003)
