= Jestem... =

Studio album by Bednarek
- Released: November 28, 2012
- Recorded: Sound & More Studio, Pro Silesia Studio, As One Studio, Muzik Millenium Studio
- Genre: Reggae
- Language: English, Polish
- Label: Lou & Rocked Boys
- Producer: Jarosław Smak, Mariusz Dziurawiec

Bednarek chronology
Jestem... (2012)	Jestem...suplement (2013)

Singles from Jestem...
- 1. "Nie chcę wyjeżdżać stąd" Released: July 8, 2012

Professional ratings
Review scores
Source	Rating
Onet.pl	8/10 stars

Jestem... is the first studio album by the Polish reggae band Bednarek. The album was released on November 28, 2012, by Lou & Rocked Boys.

The album landed at number 1 on Polish Albums Chart. On February 19, 2014 Jestem... was certified triple Platinum in Poland for selling 90,000 copies.

== Track listing ==
No.	Title	Length
1.	"Think About Tomorrow"	3:55
2.	"Jestem…(Sobą)" (featuring Kamil "Staff" Stefański)	3:53
3.	"Światu Brakuje Troski" (featuring Piotr "Gutek" Gutkowski)	3:58
4.	"Keep On Trying"	3:51
5.	"Dni Których Jeszcze Nie Znamy" (Marek Grechuta cover)	3:19
6.	"Salut!"	2:35
7.	"Chodź Ucieknijmy…"	4:14
8.	"Dla Ciebie"	3:26
9.	"Revolution"	3:42
10.	"Jest Takie Miejsce" (featuring Dawid Potrasz)	3:53
11.	"Fly Away"	3:46
12.	"Nie Chcę Wyjeżdżać Stąd"	3:30
13.	"Cisza"	4:00

== Personnel ==
Bednarek

- Kamil "Maccabraa" Bednarek - vocals
- Piotr "Zwierz" Stanclik - bass guitar
- Maciek "Dzidzia" Pilarz - drums
- Radek "Padaczi" Szyszkowski - keyboards
- Piotr "Piter" Bielawski - guitars

Additional musicians

- Dawid Potrasz - additional vocals (10)
- Kamil "Staff" Stefański - additional vocals (2)
- Piotr "Gutek" Gutkowski - additional vocals (3)
- Ania Mrożek - backing vocals (1, 3, 4, 6–11, 13)
- Kornelia Bednarek - backing vocals (1, 3, 4, 6–13)
- Monika Biczysko - backing vocals (12)
- Adam Mościcki - percussion
- Michał Jelonek - violin (1, 9)
- Filip "Funky Filon" Rakowski - scratches (2)
- Richard Doswell - tenor saxophone
- Eddie Rieband - trombone (3, 4, 6, 8, 10–12)
- David Fullwood - trumpet, flugelhorn

Production

- Jarosław Smak, Mariusz Dziurawiec - producer, mixing, mastering
- Mariusz Dziurawiec, Sebastian Witkowski, Adam Lemanczyk, Radosław Wocial,
  Jarosław Smak, Mariusz Dziurawiec, Magiera, Whitehouse - recording
- Mentalporn (Katarzyna Zaremba and Piotr "Qras" Kurek) - design, photography
- Aneta Wojewódzka, Wojciech Wojda - management

Note

- Recorded at Sound & More Studio, Pro Silesia Studio, As One Studio, Muzik Millenium Studio
- Produced, mixed and mastered at As One Studio
