= Marta Gałuszewska =

Polish pop singer

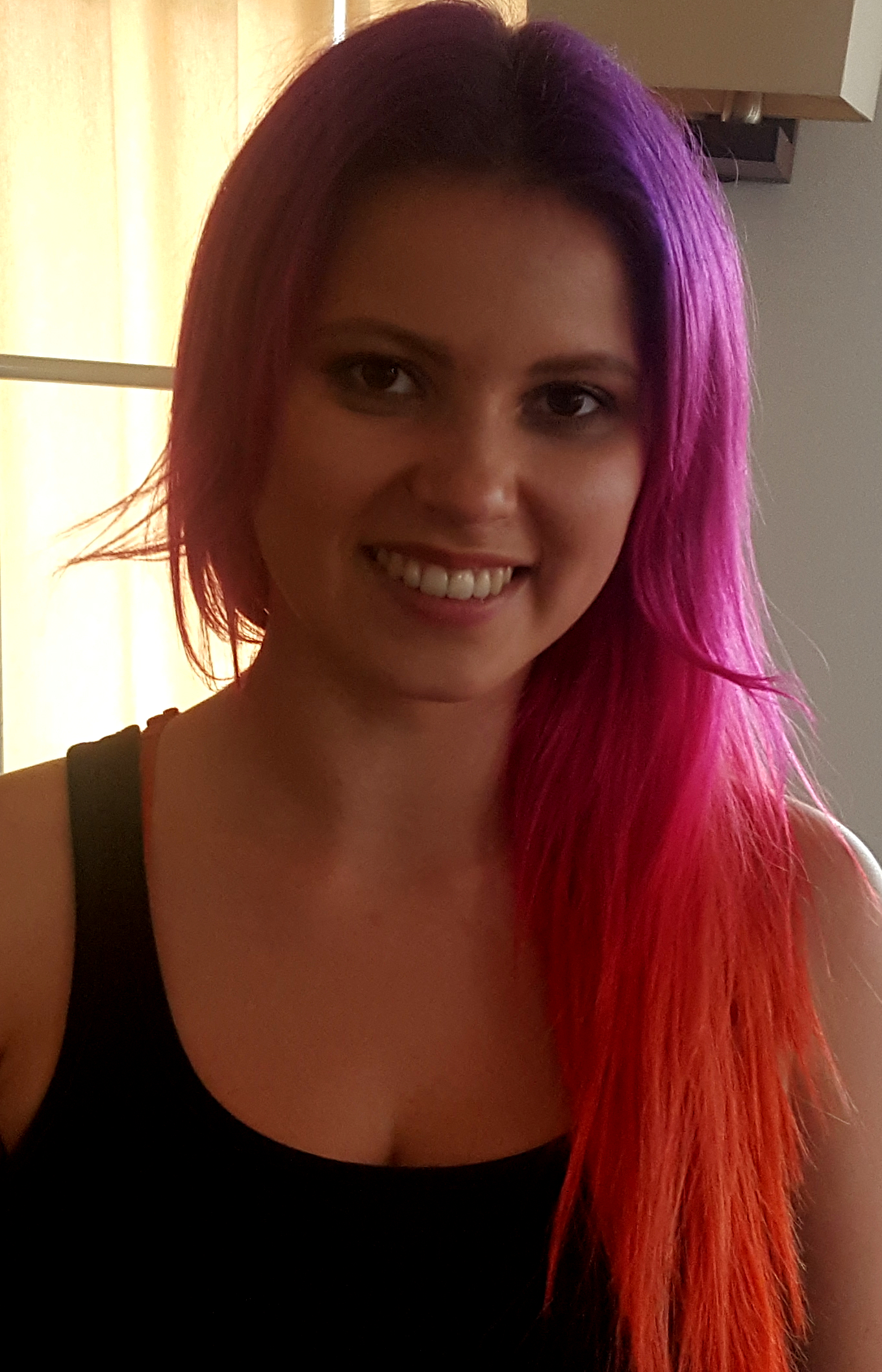
Marta Gałuszewska

Marta Gałuszewska (born 23 February 1994 in Elbląg), is a Polish pop singer, known for winning the eighth season of The Voice of Poland on 25 November 2017. She chose to join Michał Szpak team.

In the final episode of the show, Gałuszewska released her debut solo single "Nie mów mi nie". In 2018, she participated in the Polish national final for the Eurovision Song Contest 2018 with English version of her debut single, and she took 5th place.

== Singles ==
=== As lead artist ===
Title	Year	Peak chart positions			Certifications	Album
Title	Year	POL	POL New	POL Dance	Certifications	Album
"Nie mów mi nie"	2017	5	2	—	POL: Platinum	Non-album singles
"Why Don't We Go"	2018	—	—	38		Non-album singles
"Jeden dzień"	2018	—	—	—		Non-album singles
"Givin' You Up"	2018	—	—	—		Reasons
"Reasons"	2018	—	—	—		Reasons
"Show me"	2019	—	—	—		Reasons
"Jeszcze ja"	2019	—	—	—		Reasons
"That's Just Life"	2019	—	—	—		Non-album singles
"Szukam nas" (featuring Jeremi Sikorski)	2019	—	—	—		Non-album singles
"Rooftop" (as MVRT, featuring Vijay and Sofia Zlatko)	2020	—	—	—		Non-album singles
"Tylko z Tobą" (with Adam Graf)	2020	—	—	—		Non-album singles
"Bonnie & Clyde" (with Kaen)	2021	—	—	—		Jason
"S.O.S" (with Adam Graf)	2021	—	—	—		Non-album single
"—" denotes items which were not released in that country or failed to chart.

=== As featured artist ===
Title	Year	Peak chart positions				Album
Title	Year	POL	POL New	BLR	CIS	Album
"Sweet & Bitter" (Kush Kush featuring Marta Gałuszewska)	2018	17	2	26	59	Non-album single
"Perfekcja" (Kaen featuring Marta Gałuszewska)	2019	—	—	—	—	2020
"Love You Better" (Gromee featuring Marta Gałuszewska)	2019	10	—	—	—	Non-album singles
"Share The Joy" (Gromee featuring Marta Gałuszewska)	2019	2	3	—	—	Non-album singles
"—" denotes an album that did not chart or was not released in that territory.

==== Promotional singles ====
Title	Year	Album
"Ten moment" (Gromee featuring Marta Gałuszewska)	2020	Non-album singles
"Before You Go"	2020	Non-album singles
"Graveyard"	2020	Non-album singles

Awards and achievements
Preceded by Mateusz Grędziński	The Voice of Poland; Winner; 2017	Succeeded by Marcin Sójka
