= Bolshoye Kozino =

Bolshoye Kozino Большое Козино
- Urban-type settlement
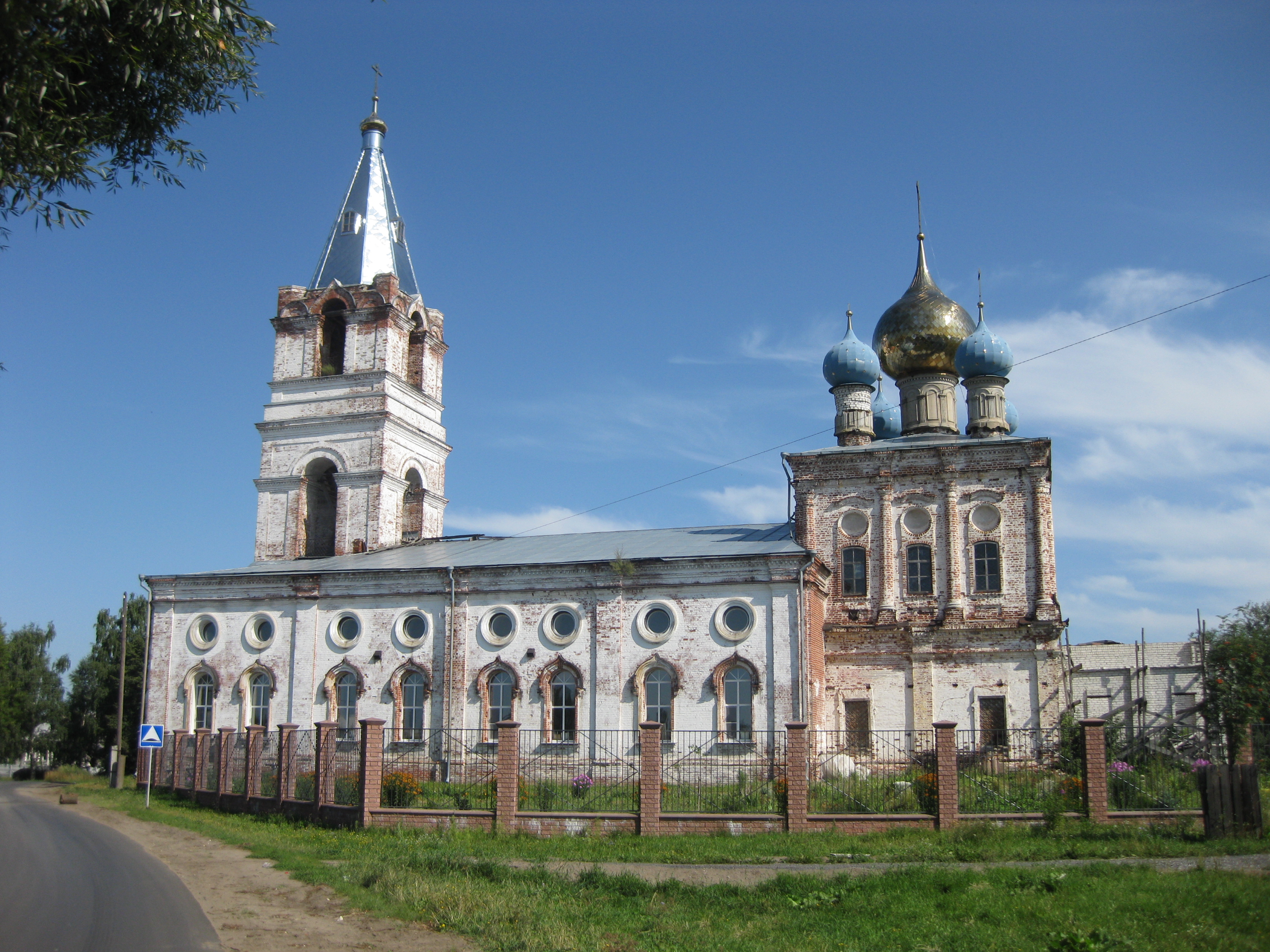
- Interactive map of Bolshoye Kozino
- Location of Bolshoye Kozino Bolshoye Kozino (Nizhny Novgorod Oblast)
- Coordinates: 56.4040°N 43.7179°E
- Country: Russia
- Federal subject: Nizhny Novgorod Oblast
- Administrative district: Balakhninsky District

Population (2010 Census)
  - Total: 5,902
  - Estimate (2021): 6,704 (+13.6%)
- Time zone: UTC+3 (MSK)
- Postal code: 606420–606422
- OKTMO ID: 22605153051

Bolshoye Kozino (Russian: Большо́е Козино́) is an urban locality (an urban-type settlement) in Balakhninsky District of Nizhny Novgorod Oblast, Russia. Population: 5,902 (2010 census); 5,664 (2002 census); 6,785 (1989 Soviet census).
