= Christopher Lloyd (disambiguation) =

Christopher Lloyd (born 1938) is an American actor.

Christopher Lloyd may also refer to:

- Christopher Lloyd (art historian) (born 1945), Surveyor of the Queen's Pictures, 1988–2005
- Christopher Lloyd (gardener) (1921–2006), author of gardening books
- Christopher Lloyd (naval historian) (1906–1986), British naval historian
- Christopher Lloyd (TV producer) (born 1960), American TV screenwriter and producer
- Chris Lloyd (born 1980), sprinter from Dominica
- Christopher Charles Lloyd (born 1982), rapper known as Lloyd Banks, member of G-Unit
- Christopher Lloyd (world history author) (born 1968), historian, educationalist and author
- Christopher Lloyd (priest) (1678–1757), Irish Anglican priest
- Chris Lloyd (writer), shortlisted for 2021 and 2025 CWA Historical Dagger
