= Christopher Lloyd (world history author) =

- Born: 1 April 1968 (age 58); Dorking, Surrey, UK
- Education: Cambridge University Peterhouse
- Occupations: Author; Publisher; Journalist
- Writing career
- Genres: Non-fiction, history, science, children's
- Notable works: What on Earth Happened?: The Complete Story of the Planet, Life and People from the Big Bang to the Present Day , The What on Earth? Wallbook of Natural History: From the dawn of life to the present day, The What on Earth? Wallbook of Science & Engineering: A Timeline of inventions from the Stone Ages to the present day
- Website: whatonearthbooks.com

Christopher Lloyd (born 1 April 1968) is a historian, educationalist and author on Big History. He is the author of What on Earth Happened: The Complete Story of the Planet (Bloomsbury, 2008), which has sold 500,000 copies. Lloyd writes with a connected learning approach. With illustrator Andy Forshaw, Lloyd has created series' of Wallbooks, These attempt to present a broader view of world history and visualise connections between the past and the present day.

Lloyd gives talk at schools, literary festivals, universities, societies, museums, businesses and institutes on a variety of topics including cross-curricular integration, narrative journeys around each of his books as well as motivational lectures. He gave a TEDx conference lecture at Reading University in early 2015.

== Family life and education ==
Lloyd was born and spent his early years in Dorking, Surrey with his parents, 2 brothers and 2 sisters until the age of 6 when the family moved to Effingham. His father, Angus Lloyd was an art dealer and one of the co-founders of Henri Lloyd Clothing along with Henri Strzelecki MBE.

Lloyd's great uncle was the English gardener and author Christopher Lloyd (gardener), OBE, of Great Dixter. His great-grandfather was Nathaniel Lloyd, an architect, printer and author who wrote several classic text books including The History of the English House and The History of British Brickworks. It was he who hired Edwin Lutyens, the celebrated architect, to renovate and extend the gardens at Dixter, later renamed Great Dixter.

As Lloyd grew up, his great uncle became an inspiration to him. It was on his death in 2006 that Lloyd decided to continue the tradition that his uncle had started, by writing one book every year.

Lloyd attended Wellesley House School in Broadstairs followed by Charterhouse. He was awarded two scholarships: Lady Ward History Scholarship and an Exhibition Scholarship, which enabled him to take up his place at Peterhouse, Cambridge, to study history. He graduated with a double first in 1990. Lloyd's Director of Studies at Cambridge University was Maurice Cowling who was also Michael Portillo’s mentor.

Upon completing his degree, Lloyd was engaged as a researcher by Sir Peregrine Worsthorne, ex-Sunday Telegraph Editor and journalist, to help him write his memoir Tricks of Memory: An Autobiography, which was published in 1993.

Lloyd went on to gain a diploma in newspaper journalism from City University of London whilst working as a graduate trainee journalist on The Sunday Times.

== Life and career ==
Lloyd joined News International in 1991 as a graduate trainee journalist on The Sunday Times newspaper. In 1993 he was appointed Innovations Editor and Technology Correspondent in quick succession. He won the 1994 Texaco award for Science Journalist of the Year.

In 1996 Lloyd became the paper's Internet Editor and was responsible for launching the first internet edition of The Times and The Sunday Times. He co-founded the internet service provider LineOne, a joint internet venture between BT Group, United News & Media and News International, which is now TalkTalk.

In 2000 Lloyd left News International to take up a position as Chief Executive of Immersive Education, an education software publishing company based in Oxford. He grew the company from its R&D phase, with zero revenue, to sales of in excess of £3 million. Whilst at Immersive Education Lloyd launched Kar2ouche story boarding education software, which was the original spark for the creation of the illustrated timeline in Lloyd's books.

Lloyd left Immersive Education in 2006 to spend time travelling around Europe with his wife and two children, both of whom were home-educated, before setting up What on Earth Publishing in 2010.

He still writes occasional articles for The Telegraph and The Sunday Times and has a monthly column for CNN English Express Magazine in Japan.

== Home educator to writer ==
Lloyd lives in rural Kent, near Tonbridge, with his wife and their two children. The decision to home educate both girls was made when, at the age of 7, the eldest complained that she was bored at school. Recognising that their daughter had become disengaged with the teaching methods used in the school, Lloyd and his wife developed a variety of creative learning techniques to re-engage and re-ignite their daughter's natural curiosity.

In 2006 Lloyd took a 4-month sabbatical to take his family on a tour of Europe, travelling by campervan. Whilst visiting historical sites and teaching his daughters, Lloyd realised, despite having a double first from Cambridge University, he did not know basic information about the world and that the fragments he knew did not connect to give a complete picture of history - either natural or human. It was at this point that Lloyd had the inspiration for his first book: A Brief History of Absolutely Everything, later renamed What on Earth Happened? The Complete Story of the Planet, Life and People from the Big Bang to the Present Day, which combines both the natural and human history of the world in a single 42 chapter narrative.

== Wallbooks ==
In 2010, wanting to publish a children's version of What on Earth Happened?, Lloyd teamed up with illustrator Andy Forshaw to pioneer a new format for big history storytelling that would feature a giant illustrated visual timeline that could be pulled-out and displayed on a wall, as well as read like a book. The Wallbooks were designed to give young people an integrated view of the world by contextualising knowledge through connections. Lloyd describes it as reviving the traditional art of telling stories through highly illustrated and intricate timelines such as the Codex Zouche-Nuttall and the Bayeux Tapestry. This resulted in the formation of What on Earth Publishing, a non-fiction publishing house. For the first five years Lloyd and Forshaw ran the publishing company as a lifestyle business, producing a new Wallbook once a year. They teamed up with the Natural History Museum (Nature Wallbook), the Science Museum (Science Wallbook), The Shakespeare Birthplace Trust (Shakespeare Wallbook)and the National Trust (British History Wallbook).

Then, in 2015, Lloyd and Forshaw created a timeline book to coincide with the 800th anniversary of the sealing of Magna Carta 1215 - 2015. The Magna Carta Chronicles were distributed to all 24,000 schools across the UK, courtesy of the Magna Carta Trust 800th Committee, chaired by Sir Robert Worcester.

During this project Worcester and Lloyd became friends, resulting in Worcester becoming chairman of What on Earth Publishing in 2017. Over the next three years, the publisher partnered organisations in China, the US and Australia, including with the American Museum of Natural History in New York and The Smithsonian in Washington D.C. In 2018 What on Earth Publishing created the first in a series of US State histories, to coincide with the bicentennial of Illinois 1818 to 2018. As part of the Bicentennial, two copies of The Illinois Chronicles and a 12-foot-long laminated timeline of state history were sent to all 5,000 schools by the state's Bicentennial commission - in partnership with the Abraham Lincoln Presidential Library and Museum in Springfield, Illinois. This was the start of a series of state history projects, including the Texas Chronicles, developed in partnership with The Bullock Texas State History Museum and The Massachusetts Chronicles, developed in partnership with Plymouth400 and Bridgewater State University.

In July 2019 Lloyd partnered with Britannica Inc, publishers of the Encyclopædia Britannica, based in Chicago, Illinois. The two companies formed a joint publishing venture, called Britannica Books. The new imprint was launched in October 2020 with the publication of the Britannica All New Children's Encyclopedia: What We Know and What We Don't. More than 30,000 copies were distributed in the week of publication. What on Earth Publishing publishes between 20 and 30 books a year with distribution in the UK through Bounce Marketing, in the USA through Ingram Publisher Services and in Australia through Walker Books.

== Lectures and workshops ==
Lloyd lectures and conducts workshops about cross-curricular integration and motivational reward pathways to schools, teachers, home education groups, literary festivals, businesses, societies, museums, clubs and universities both in the UK and abroad.

Lloyd's signature talks incorporate the use of a coat of many pockets, each pocket containing an everyday object representing a moment in the Wallbook timeline. The idea is a bid to revive the ancient itinerant storytelling traditions and the concept of using objects as memory devices. Lloyd describes it as a throwback to the rhetorical traditions pioneered in Ancient Greece.

Lloyd is a regular feature at Hay Festival, Chalke Valley Festival, Bath Literature Festival, Cheltenham Festival, Oxford Literary Festival, Woodstock Festival, Marlborough Literature Festival and Henley Literary Festival. Overseas appearances include the Asahi Environmental Forum 2013, Jaipur International Book Festival, Gibraltar Literary Festival, PINC Sarasota and PINC Amsterdam.

Lloyd has also given talks at the Natural History Museum, Science Museum, The Daiwa Foundation, Institute of Mechanical Engineers, Linnean Society of London, The Royal Institution, The Royal Geographical Society (Christmas lecture 2013) and Shakespeare Birthplace Trust.

== Charitable works ==
Lloyd set up the What on Earth Foundation, a grant-making registered charity (registered number 1153814), established to help schools, teachers and educational groups gain access to a more creative, curiosity-led approach to teaching and learning. In conjunction with Pratham Books, a not-for-profit publisher, which aims to ensure that every child in India owns a book, Lloyd arranged for the What on Earth? Wallbook of Big History to be translated into Hindi and made available as part of Pratham Books initiative.

== List of works ==
Lloyd has sold over 1 million books, 500,000 of which are What on Earth Happened?, which has now been translated into 15 languages and serialised into an 80 part series by TV Tokyo.

- What on Earth Happened?: The Complete Story of the Planet, Life and People from the Big Bang to the Present Day (Bloomsbury, first edition 2008, second edition 2012)
- What on Earth Happened? in Brief: The Planet, Life and People from the Big Bang to the Present Day (Bloomsbury, 2009)
- What on Earth Evolved?: 100 Species That Changed the World (Bloomsbury, 2009)
- What on Earth Evolved? in Brief: 100 Species That Have Changed the World (Bloomsbury, 2010)
- The Magna Carta Chronicle: A Young Person's Guide to 800 Years in the Fight for Freedom in partnership with the Magna Carta Trust (What on Earth Publishing, 2015)
- Absolutely Everything - A History of Earth, Dinosaurs, Rulers, Robots and Other Things Too Numerous to Mention (What on Earth Publishing, first edition 2018)
- Humanimal - Incredible Ways Animals Are Just Like Us (What on Earth Publishing, first edition 2019)
- The Britannica All New Children's Encyclopedia: What We Know and What We Don't (Britannica Books, first edition 2020)

Wallbooks –in various formats including Stickerbook, Quizbook and Posterbook.

- The What on Earth? Wallbook Timeline of Big History (What on Earth Publishing, first edition 2010, second edition 2015)
- The What on Earth? Wallbook Timeline of Natural History (What on Earth Publishing, first edition 2011, second edition 2015)
- The What on Earth? Wallbook Timeline of Sport (What on Earth Publishing, first edition 2012, second edition 2015)
- The What on Earth? Wallbook Timeline of Science & Engineering (What on Earth Publishing, first edition 2013, second edition 2015)
- The What on Earth? Wallbook Timeline of Shakespeare (What on Earth Publishing, first edition 2014, 2nd edition 2015)
- The What on Earth? Wallbook Timeline of the History of Britain (What on Earth Publishing, first edition 2016)
