= The Voice Senior (Polish TV series) =

Polish talent show

- Genre: Reality television
- Created by: John de Mol
- Developed by: Talpa Content
- Directed by: Rinke Rooyens
- Presented by: Małgorzata Tomaszewska; Rafał Brzozowski; Tomasz Kammel; Marta Manowska; Janina Busk † (backstage); Marek Grąbczewski (backstage); Robert Stockinger; Łukasz Nowicki
- Judges: Alicja Majewska; Urszula Dudziak; Marek Piekarczyk; Andrzej Piaseczny; Witold Paszt †; Izabela Trojanowska; Piotr Cugowski; Maryla Rodowicz; Alicja Węgorzewska; Tomasz Szczepanik; Halina Frąckowiak; Robert Janowski; Małgorzata Ostrowska; Tatiana Okupnik; Majka Jeżowska
- Theme music composer: Martijn Schimmer
- Country of origin: Poland
- Original language: Polish
- No. of seasons: 7
- No. of episodes: 45

Production
- Producer: Rochstar

Original release
- Network: TVP 2
- Release: December 7, 2019 – present

Related
- The Voice of Poland; The Voice Kids; The Voice (franchise)

The Voice Senior is a Polish reality talent show premiered on December 7, 2019, on the TVP 2 television network. The Voice Senior is part of the international syndication The Voice and The Voice Kids based on the reality singing competition launched in the Netherlands as The Voice of Holland, created by Dutch television producer John de Mol. However, participation is only open for candidates of more than 60 years old.

== Format ==
The show consists of four different phases: production auditions, blind auditions, the "sing-off", and the live finale. The production auditions are not filmed, and this is where contestants are selected to go to the blind auditions.

=== Blind auditions ===
The contestants sing during the blind audition while the chairs of the coaches are turned over. Each candidate has the chance to sing a song of their choice for about a minute and a half. Coaches can only choose the contestant on the basis of musicality and voice by pressing the button, causing their chairs to turn around and facing the artist. If two or more coaches want the same artist, the artist chooses which coach they want to continue in the program. The blind auditions end when all teams are full.

=== Semifinal ===
Each coach pairs two or three singers from his team who have to compete against each other by performing a song chosen by the coach. After the performances, the coach chooses one contestant from each pair to advance to the next round.

=== Live finale ===
The remaining contestants from each team will be in the final. The live finale will be broadcast live on TVP 2. The contestants are mentored by their coach and choose a song that they want to sing in the final. The coach then decides one act to remain; the other act will then be eliminated. The final winner is chosen by the public at home by televoting.

== Coaches ==
On 19 July 2019, it was announced that Marek Piekarczyk, Urszula Dudziak, Alicja Majewska and Andrzej Piaseczny would become coaches for the show's first season, with Tomasz Kammel joining Marta Manowska to be hosts. On 17 August 2020, it was announced that Majewska and Piaseczny would return as coaches for season two, while new coaches Izabela Trojanowska and Witold Paszt would replace Piekarczyk and Dudziak. On 18 August 2021, it was announced that Majewska and Paszt would return as coaches alongside new coaches Piotr Cugowski and Maryla Rodowicz for the third season. On 16 August 2022, it was announced that Rodowicz and Cugowski would return as coaches, while Paszt and Majewska would be replaced by Alicja Węgorzewska and Tomasz Szczepanik in season four. On August 15, 2023, it was confirmed that Rodowicz, Szczepanik and Węgorzewska would return as coaches in the fifth season, joined by Halina Frąckowiak, who replaced Cugowski. On August 12, 2024, it was announced that the entire coaching panel from season 5 was replaced by Andrzej Piaseczny, returning as a coach after his three-year hiatus, alongside three debutants, Robert Janowski, Małgorzata Ostrowska, and Tatiana Okupnik. On August 10, 2025, it was announced that Majka Jeżowska would replace Małgorzata Ostrowska in the seventh season. On August 11, 2025, it was announced that Andrzej Piaseczny and Robert Janowski would join Jeżowska as coaches in the seventh season, alongside Alicja Majewska, returning to the show after a three-season hiatus would replace Tatiana Okupnik.

=== Timeline ===
Coach	Seasons							
Coach	1	2	3	4	5	6	7	8
Marek Piekarczyk								
Urszula Dudziak								
Alicja Majewska								
Andrzej Piaseczny								
Witold Paszt †								
Izabela Trojanowska								
Maryla Rodowicz								
Piotr Cugowski								
Alicja Węgorzewska								
Tomasz Szczepanik								
Halina Frąckowiak								
Małgorzata Ostrowska								
Tatiana Okupnik								
Robert Janowski								
Majka Jeżowska								

=== Gallery ===
Current coaches

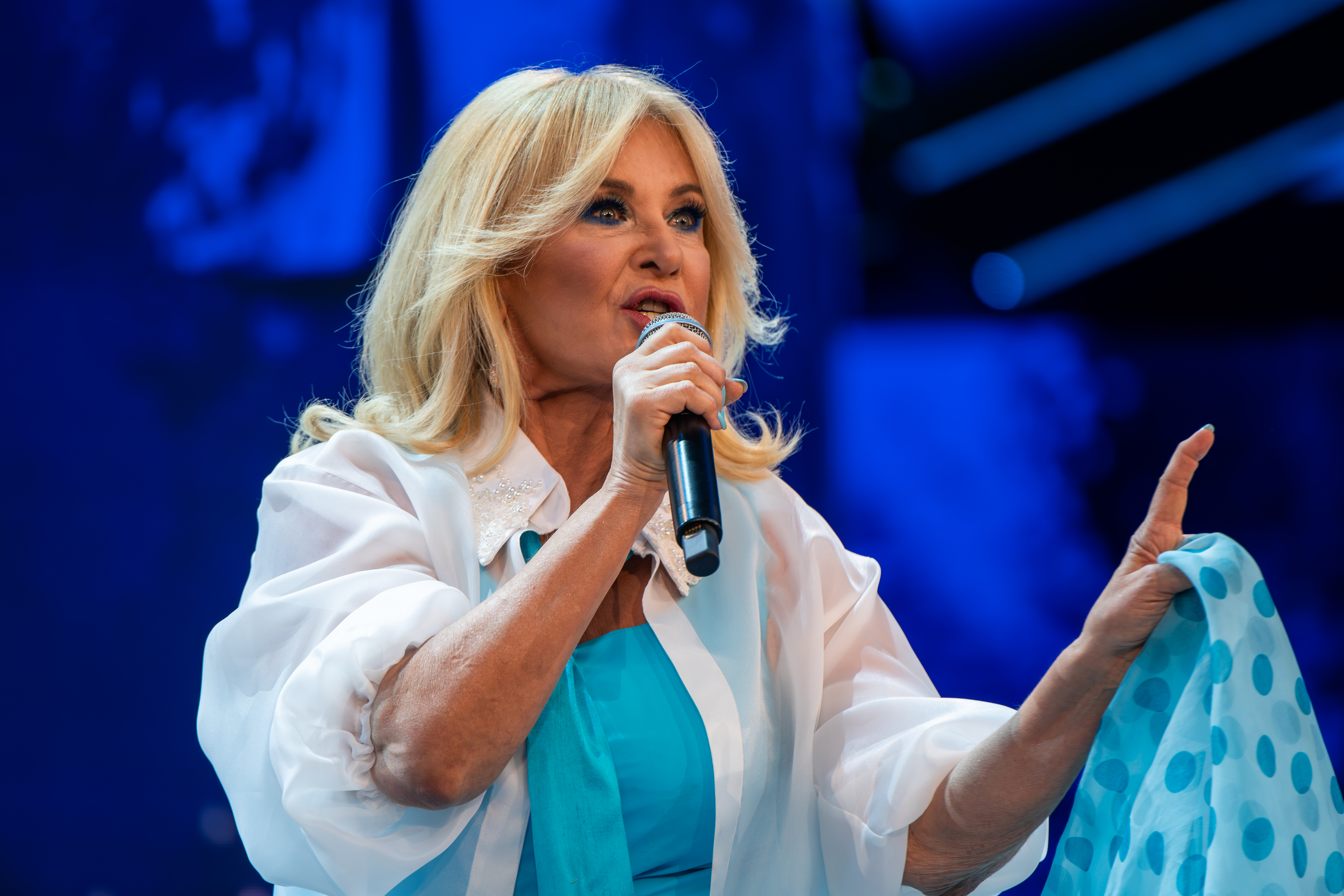
Majka Jeżowska (7–)

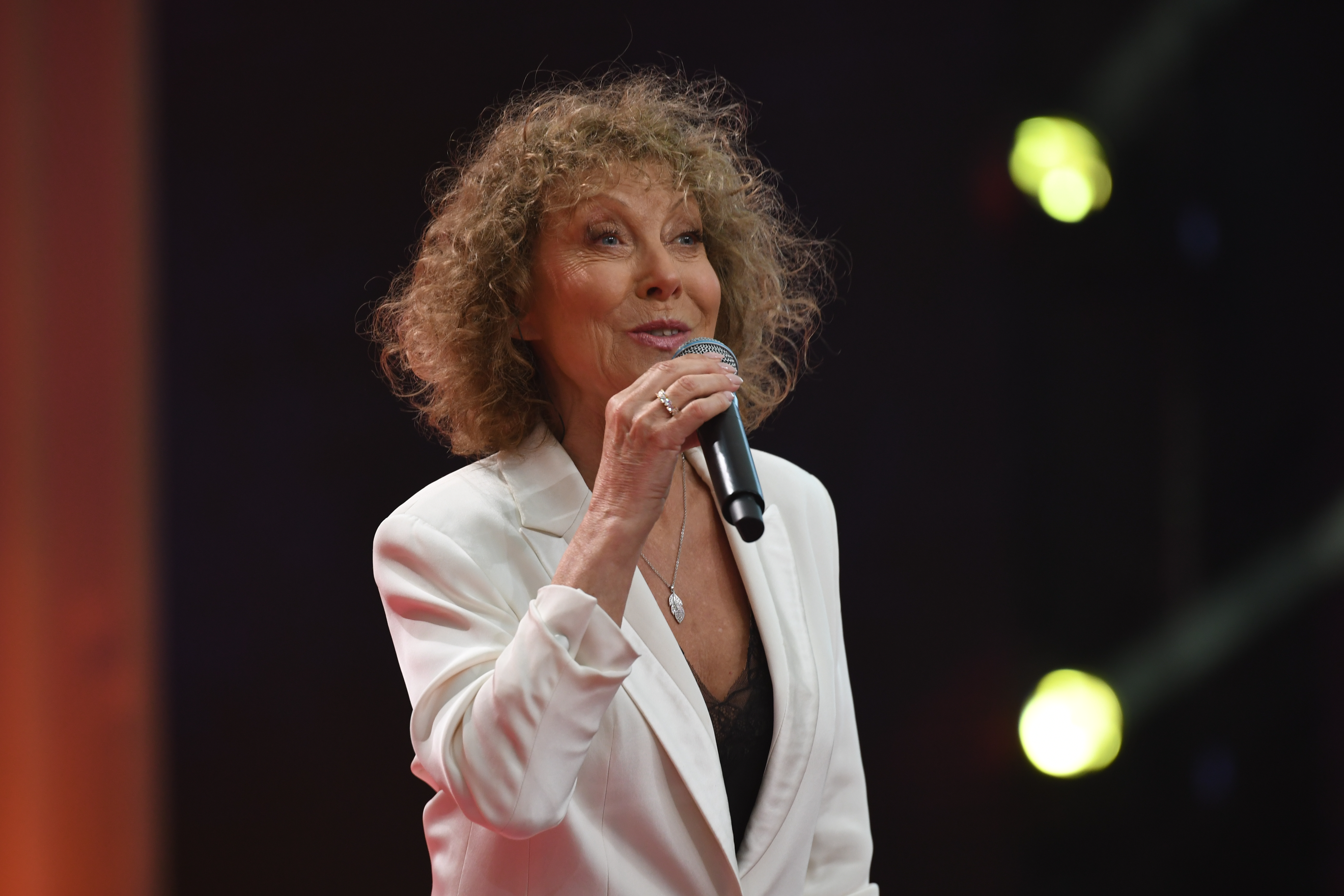
Alicja Majewska (1–3, 7–)

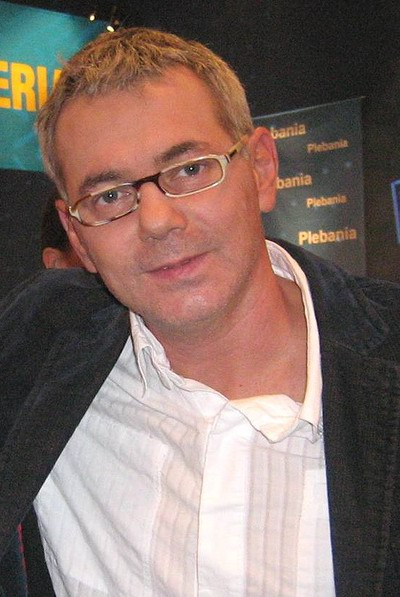
Robert Janowski (6–)

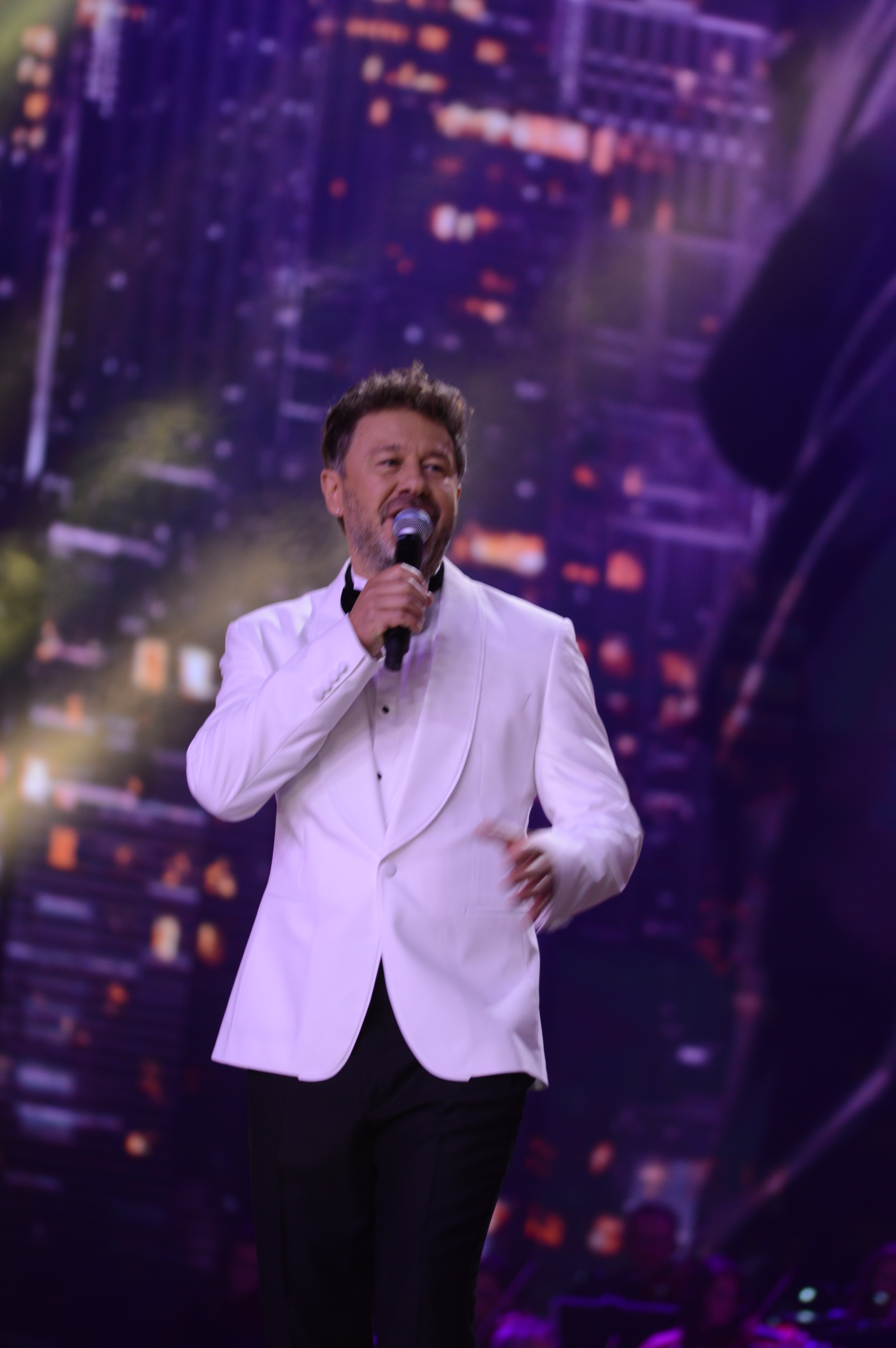
Andrzej Piaseczny (1–2, 6–)
Former coaches

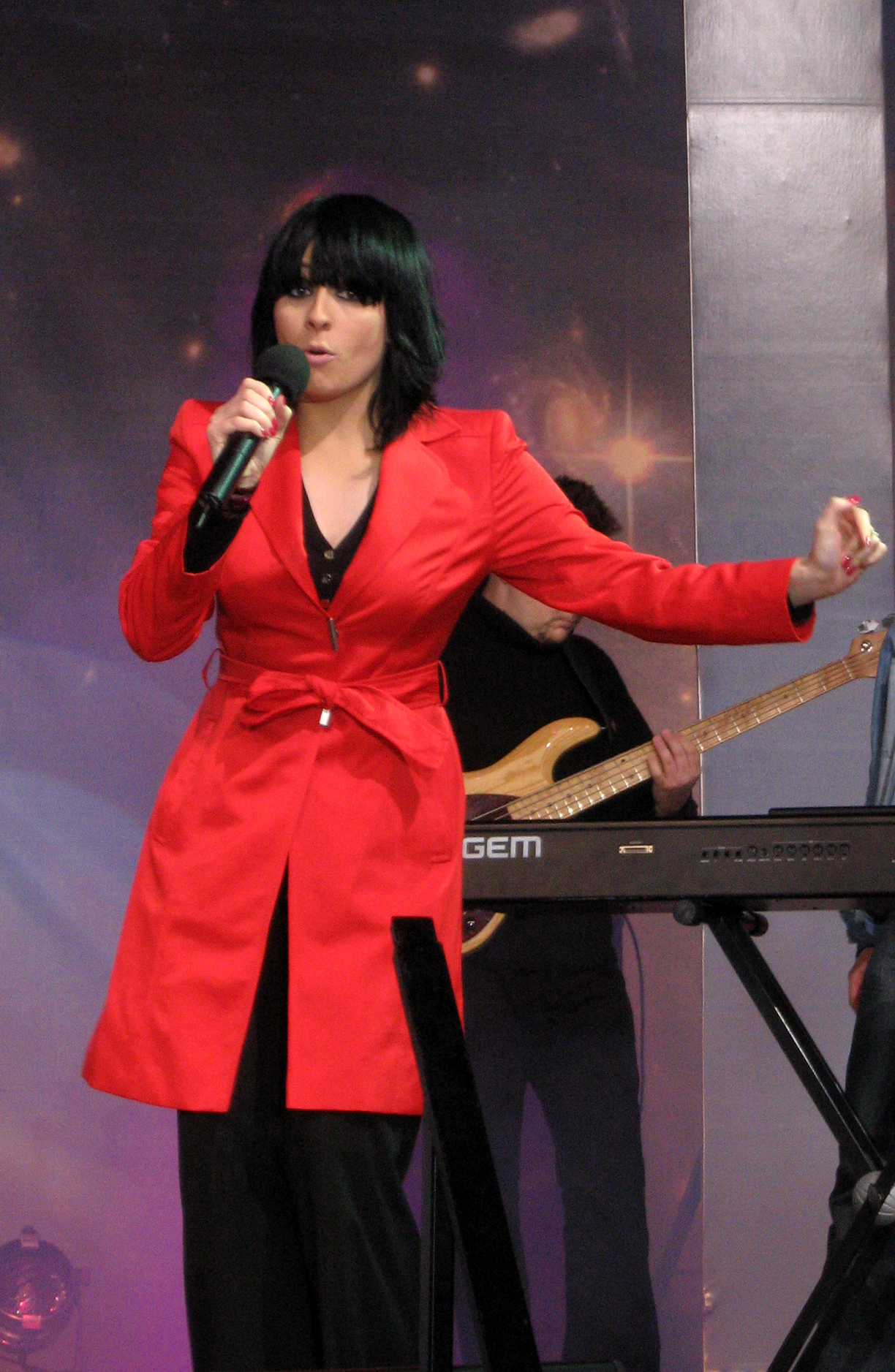
Tatiana Okupnik (6)

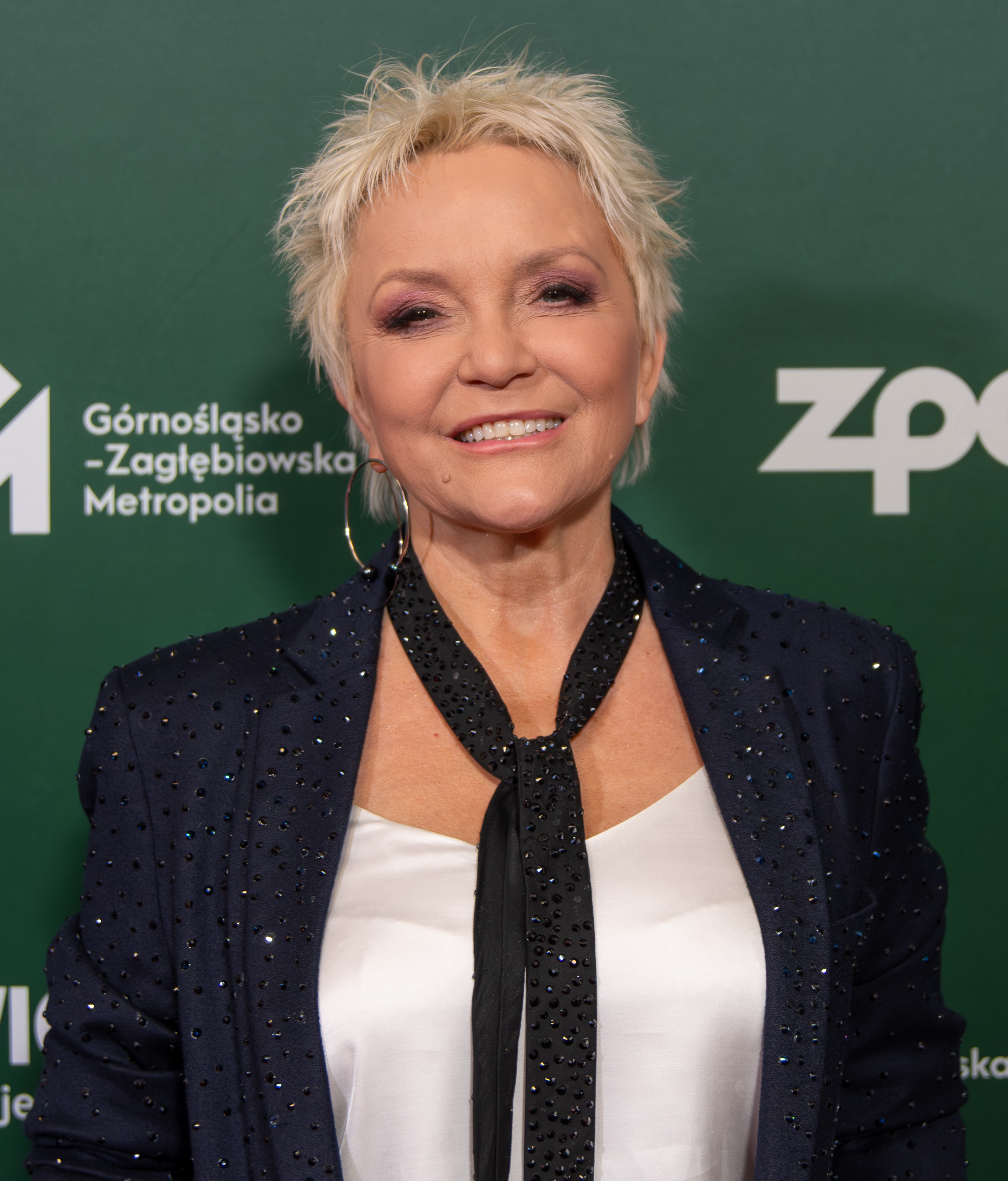
Małgorzata Ostrowska (6)

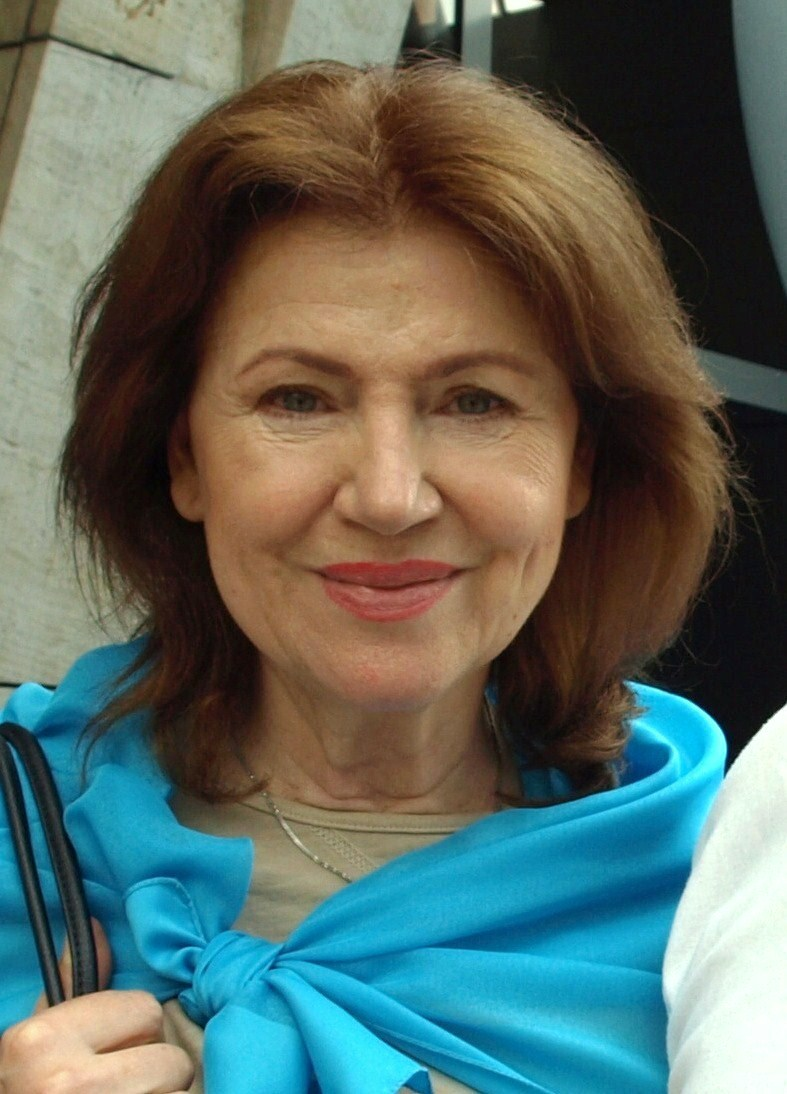
Halina Frąckowiak (5)

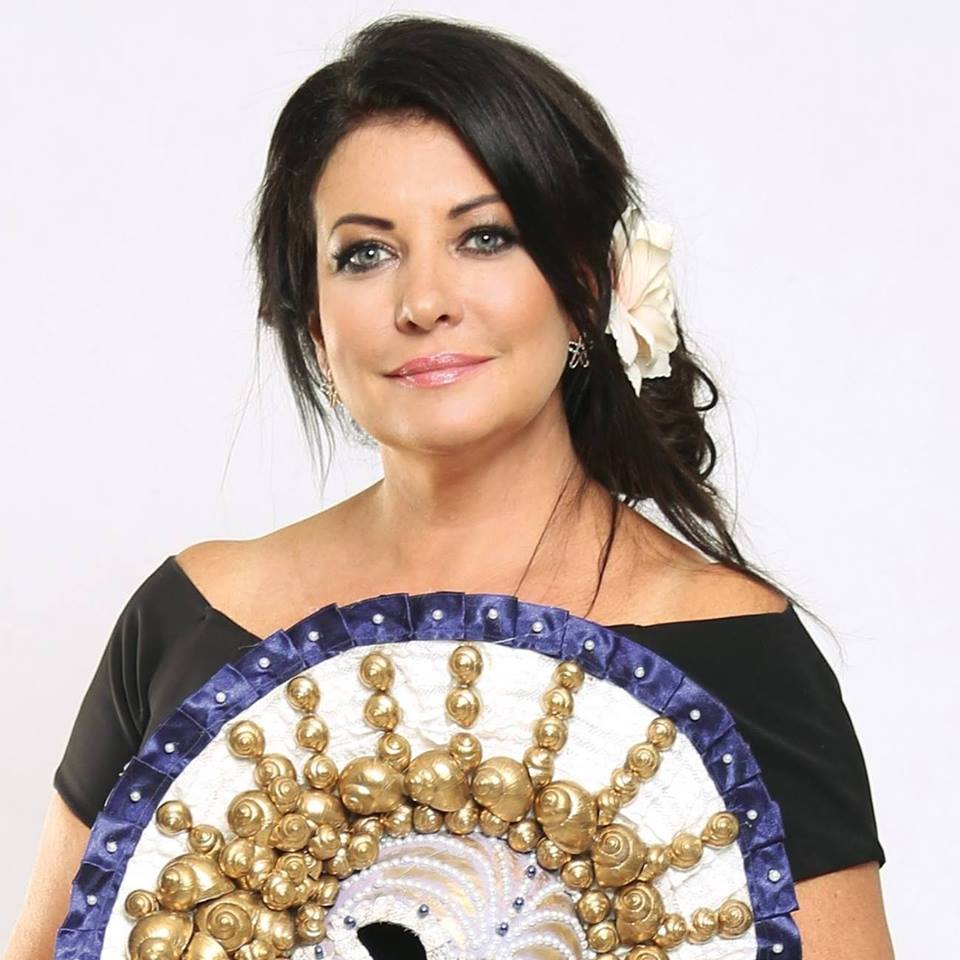
Alicja Węgorzewska (4–5)

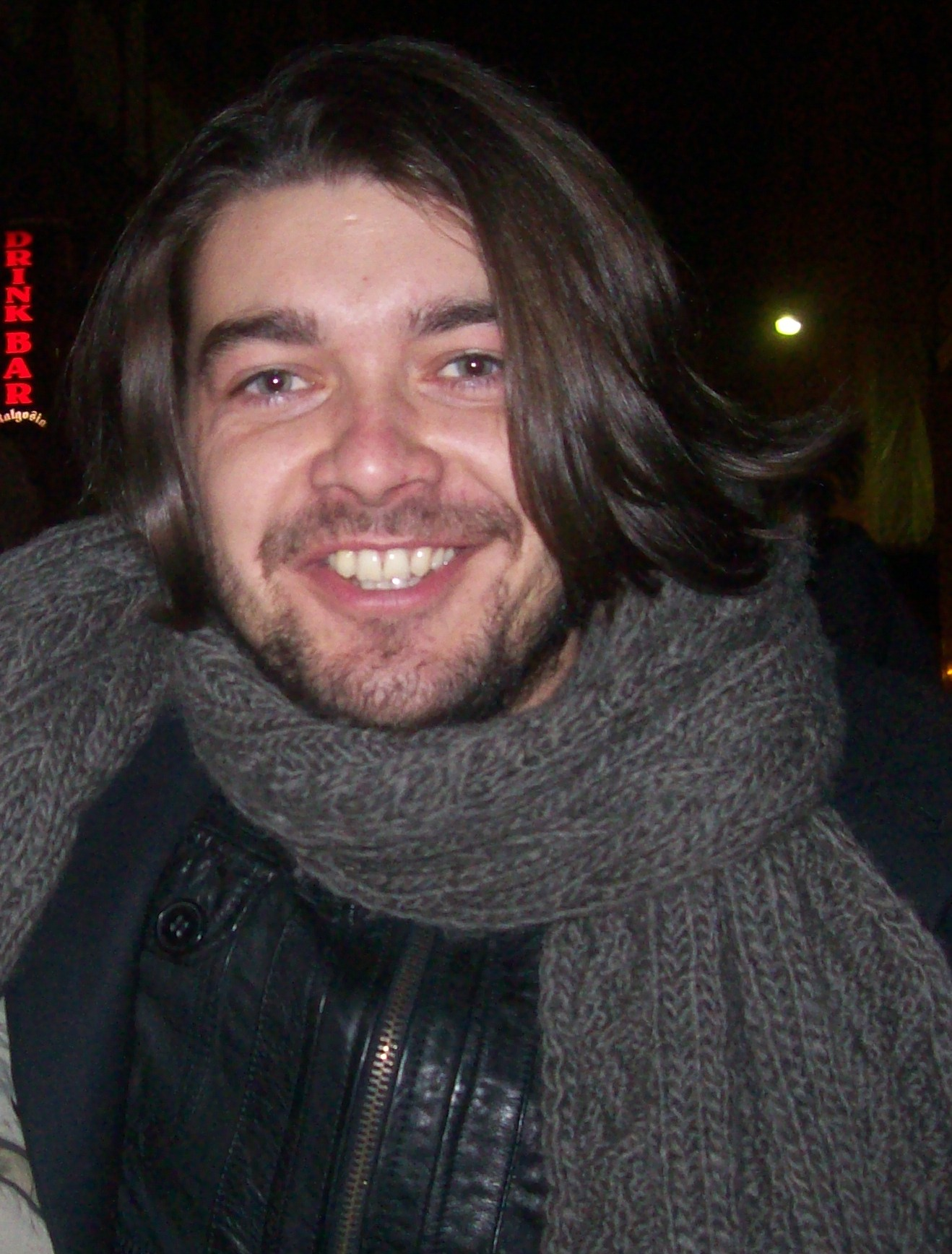
Tomasz Szczepanik (4–5)

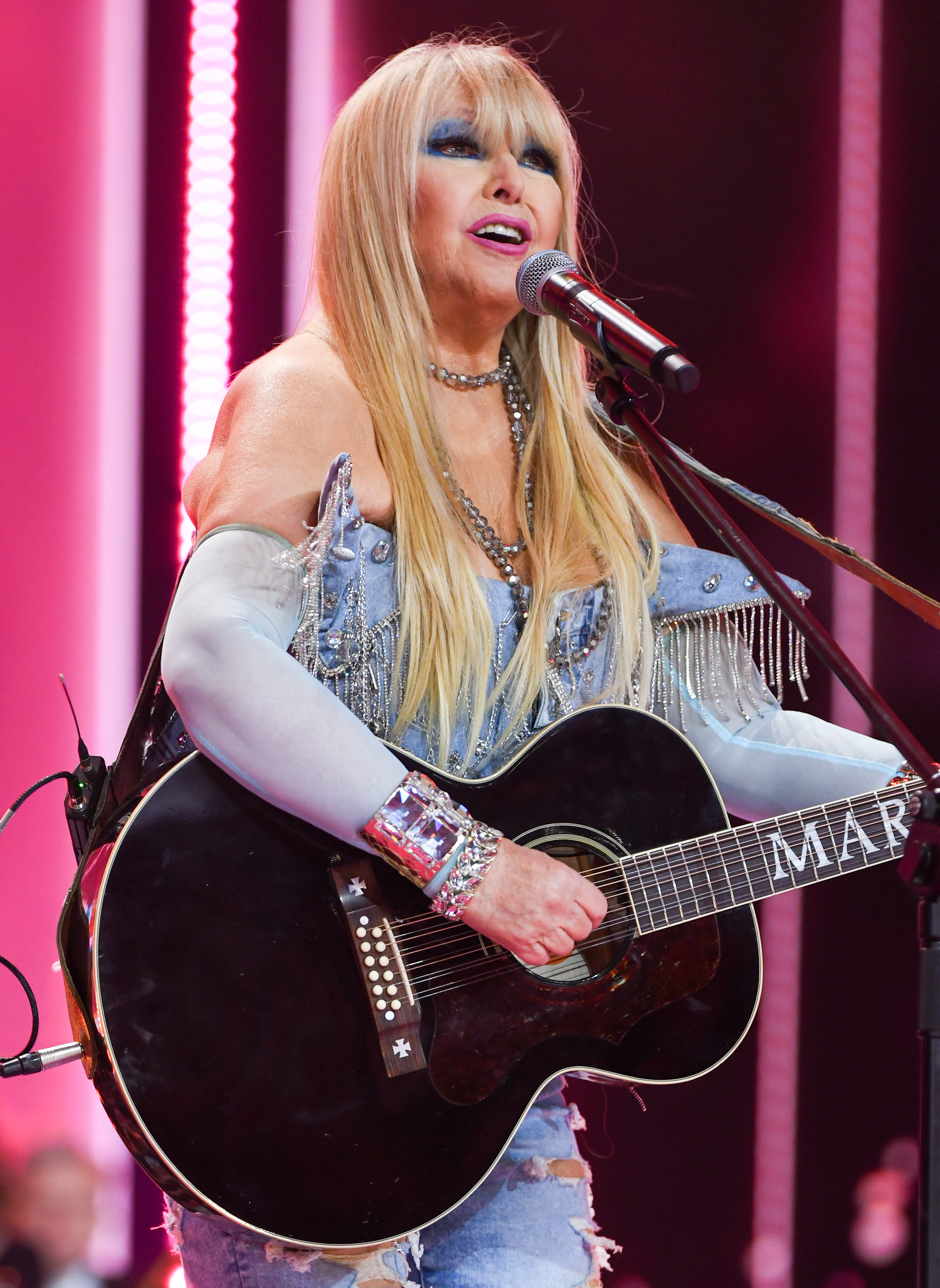
Maryla Rodowicz (3–5)

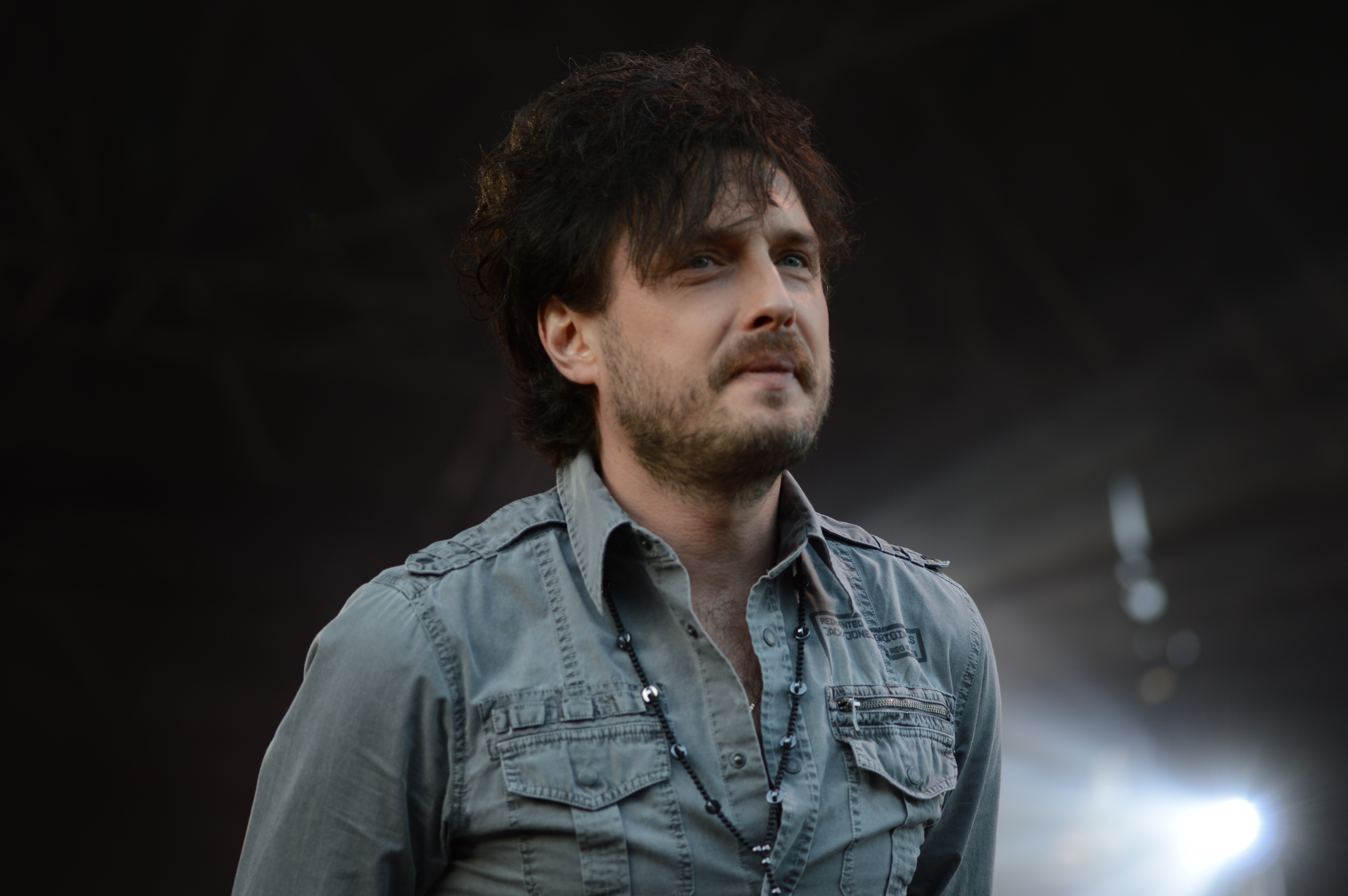
Piotr Cugowski (3–4)

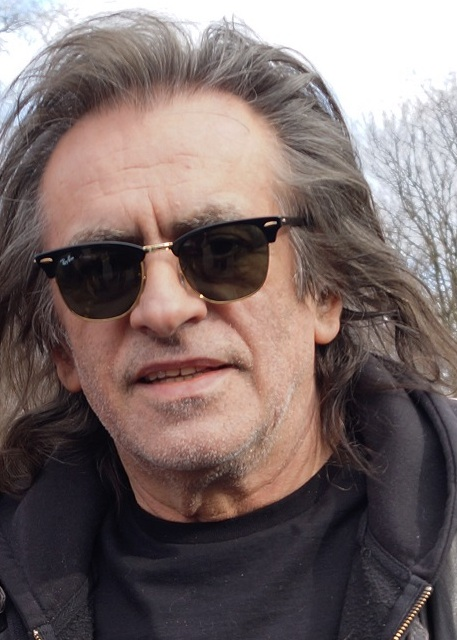
Witold Paszt (2–3)

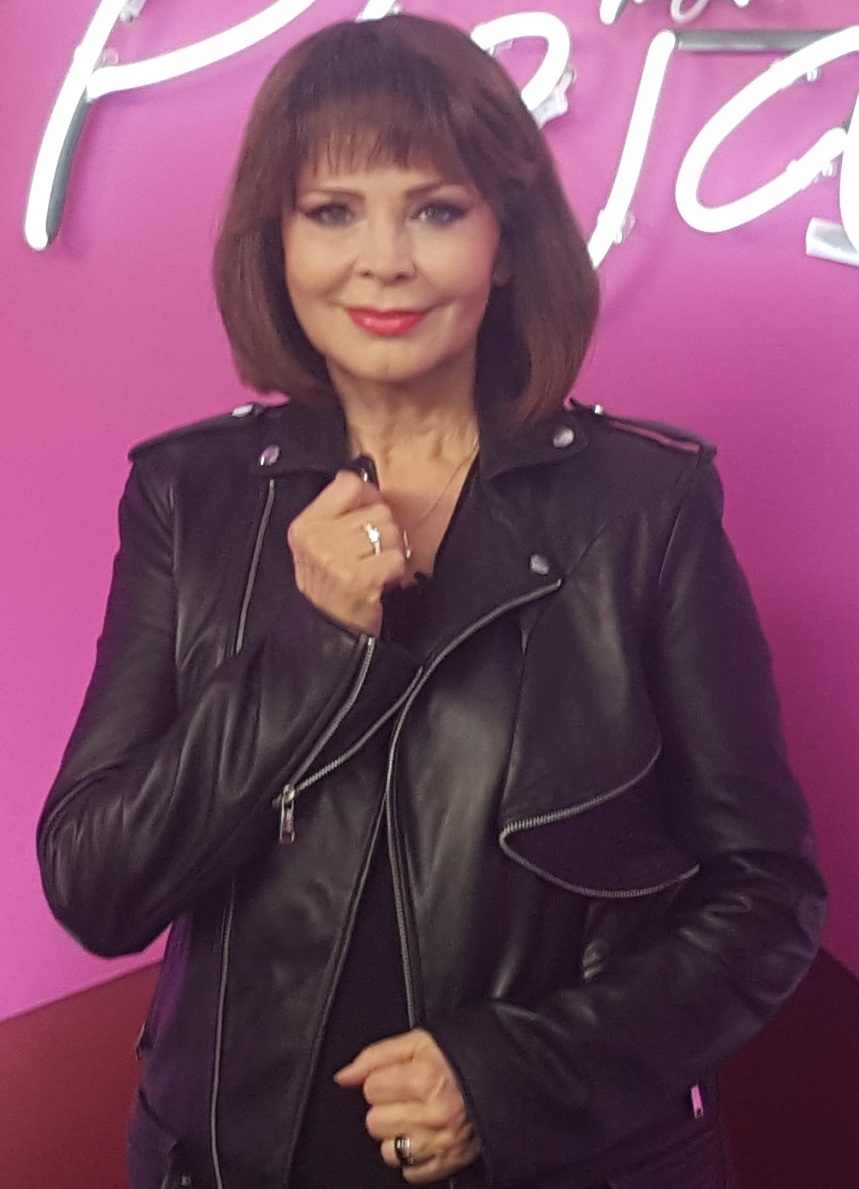
Izabela Trojanowska (2)

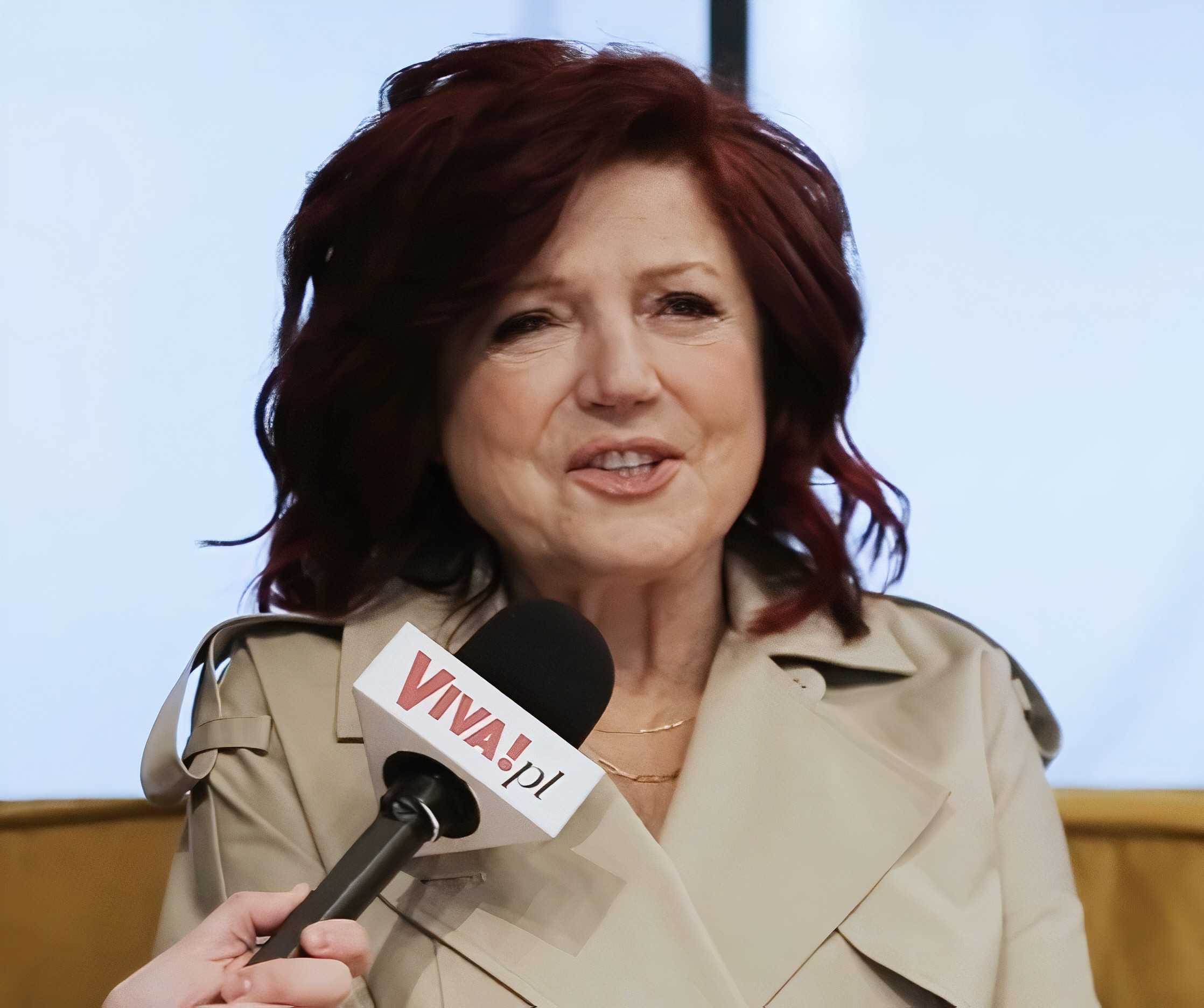
Urszula Dudziak (1)

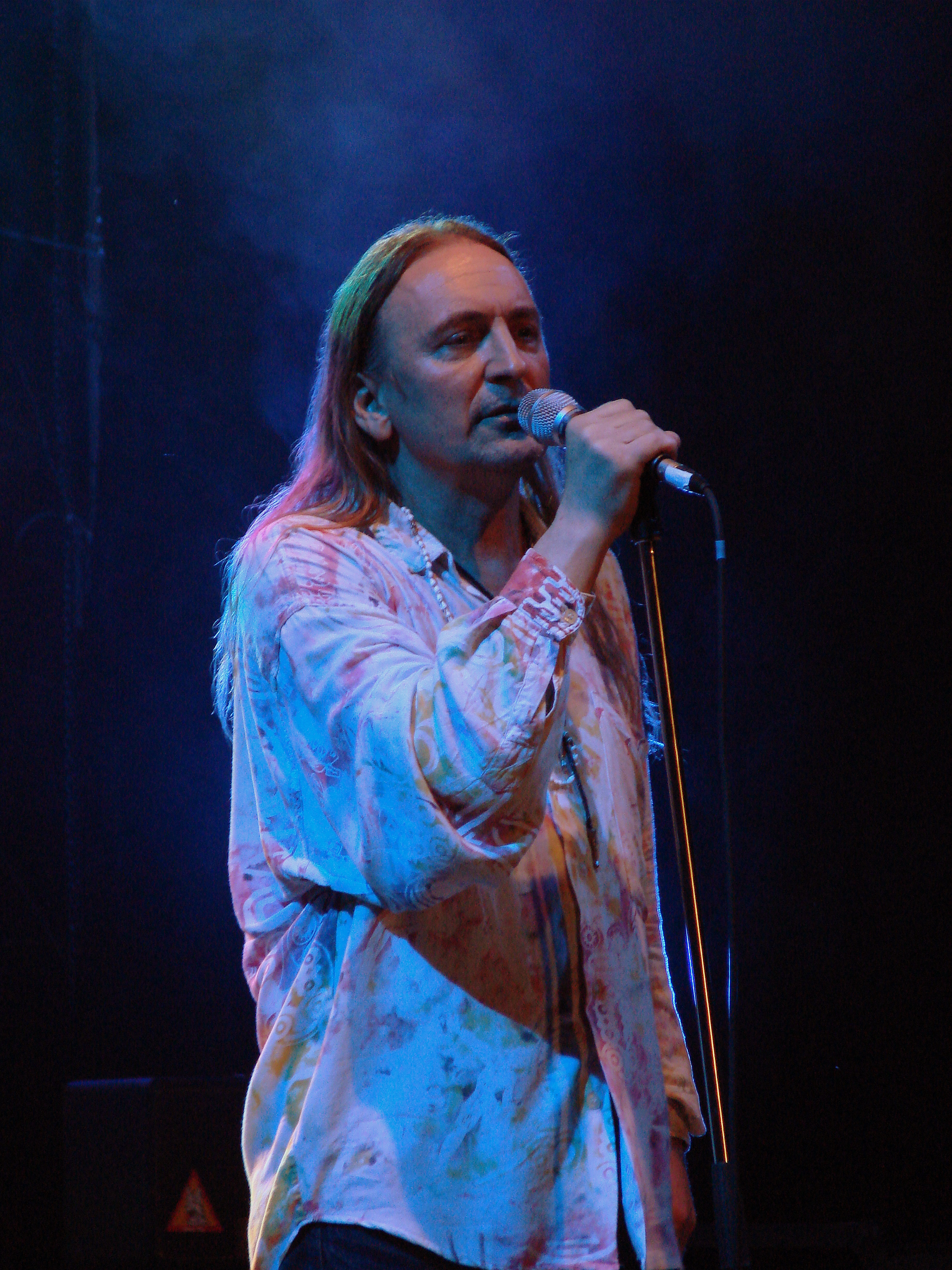
Marek Piekarczyk (1)

=== Line-up of coaches ===
Coaches' line-up by chairs order
Season	Year	Coaches			
Season	Year	1	2	3	4
1	2019	Marek	Ula	Alicja	Andrzej
2	2021	Andrzej	Alicja	Witold	Izabela
3	2022	Piotr	Maryla	Witold	Alicja
4	2023	Alicja	Tomasz	Maryla	Piotr
5	2024	Alicja	Maryla	Tomasz	Halina
6	2025	Andrzej	Małgorzata	Tatiana	Robert
7	2026	Andrzej	Alicja	Majka	Robert
8	2027	Andrzej	Alicja	Majka	Robert

== Hosts ==
=== Key ===
Main presenter
Backstage presenter

=== Timeline ===
Timeline of hosts
Host	Seasons						
Host	1	2	3	4	5	6	7
Marta Manowska							
Tomasz Kammel							
Marek Grąbczewski							
Janina Busk †							
Rafał Brzozowski							
Małgorzata Tomaszewska							
Robert Stockinger							
Łukasz Nowicki							

== Coaches and finalists ==
- Winner
- Runner-up

Season	Coaches and their finalists			
1	Team Marek	Team Ula	Team Alicja	Team Andrzej
1	Władysław Jarecki	Elżbieta Szymańska, Jolanta Szydłowska-Cichoń, Krystyna Szydłowska	Janusz Sztyber	Bogumiła Kucharczyk-Włodarek
1	Kazimierz Kiljan	Waldemar Wiśniewski	Jadwiga Kocik	Mieczysław Pernach
2	Team Andrzej	Team Alicja	Tean Witold	Team Izabela
2	Barbara Parzeczewska	Raisa Misztela	Andrzej Pawłowski	Andrzej Nosowski
2	Anna Tchórzewska	Kazimierz Górecki	Ewa Olszewska	Andrzej Szpak
3	Team Piotr	Team Maryla	Team Witold	Team Alicja
3	Jerzy Herman	Larysa Tsoy	Krzysztof Prusik	Andrzej Biliński
3	Grażyna Rutkowska-Kusa	Ryszard Wagner	Aleksandra Matusiak-Kujawska, Bożena Wesołowska, Bernard Łyżwiński, Lech Sawicki	Iwona Dołowska
4	Team Alicja	Team Tomasz	Team Maryla	Team Piotr
4	Andrzej Raniszewski	Hanna Tabiszewska	Zbigniew Zaranek	James Brierley †
4	Wioletta Malenda	Marzena Buczek	Janusz Łuszczak	Marian Tarnowski
5	Team Alicja	Team Maryla	Team Tomasz	Team Halina
5	Tadeusz Talarek	Roman Wojciechowski	Piotr Sałata	Regina Rosłaniec-Bavcevic
5	Małgorzata Kraszkiewicz	Lucyna Mazur	Wojciech Kwiatkowski	Róża Frąckiewicz
6	Team Andrzej	Team Małgorzata	Team Tatiana	Team Robert
6	Bożena Gloc	Krzysztof Warzecha	Ewa Ihalainen	Wojciech Bardowski
6	Eugenia Kasprzycka	Maria Larmes	Marian Rain	Bogusław Buczkowski
7	Team Andrzej	Team Alicja	Team Majka	Team Robert
7	Violetta Kapcewicz	Grażyna Osmala	Artur Słowik	Małgorzata Skrzypczak
7	Krzysztof Koziarski	Albert Czarkowski	Robert Ziętara	Ryszard Orecki
8	Team Andrzej	Team Alicja	Team Majka	Team Robert

== Series overview ==
Warning: the following table presents a significant amount of different colors

Teams color key
Artist from Team Alicja M.	Artist from Team Witold	Artist from Team Halina
Artist from Team Andrzej	Artist from Team Maryla	Artist from Team Małgorzata
Artist from Team Marek	Artist from Team Piotr	Artist from Team Robert
Artist from Team Urszula	Artist from Team Alicja W.	Artist from Team Tatiana
Artist from Team Izabela	Artist from Team Tomasz	Artist from Team Majka

The Voice series overview
Season	Year	Winner	Runners-up			Winning coach	Main hosts	
1	2019	Jola, Krystyna & Ela	Bogumiła Włodarek	Janusz Sztyber	Władysław Jarecki	Urszula Dudziak	Marta Manowska	Tomasz Kammel
2	2021	Barbara Parzeczewska	Raisa Misztela	Andrzej Pawłowski	Andrzej Nosowski	Andrzej Piaseczny	Marta Manowska	Rafał Brzozowski
3	2022	Krzysztof Prusik	Jerzy Herman	Larysa Tsoy	Andrzej Biliński	Witold Paszt	Marta Manowska	Rafał Brzozowski
4	2023	Zbigniew Zaranek	Andrzej Raniszewski	James Brierley	Hanna Tabiszewska	Maryla Rodowicz	Małgorzata Tomaszewska	Rafał Brzozowski
5	2024	Regina Bavcevic	Piotr Sałata	Roman Wojciechowski	Tadeusz Talarek	Halina Frąckowiak	Marta Manowska	Rafał Brzozowski
6	2025	Wojciech Bardowski	Bożena Gloc	Ewa Ihalainen	Krzysztof Warzecha	Robert Janowski	Marta Manowska	Robert Stockinger
7	2026	Violetta Kapcewicz	Małgorzata Skrzypczak	Grażyna Osmala	Artur Słowik	Andrzej Piaseczny	Marta Manowska	Łukasz Nowicki
8	2027	Upcoming season						

=== Season 1 (2019) ===
The show premiered on December 7, 2019. The judges for season 1 were Andrzej Piaseczny, Alicja Majewska, Urszula Dudziak and Marek Piekarczyk. The show was hosted by Tomasz Kammel, Marta Manowska and Janina Busk. The winners of the first series were Jola, Krystyna & Ela Szydłowskie from Team Urszula.

=== Season 2 (2021) ===
The second season of the show premiered on January 2, 2021. Alicja Majewska and Andrzej Piaseczny returned as the coaches in the second season, but Urszula Dudziak and Marek Piekarczyk are replaced by Witold Paszt and Izabela Trojanowska, as new coaches. The show was hosted by Rafał Brzozowski and Marta Manowska. Tomasz Kammel resigned from the function of presenter. The winner of the second series was Barbara Parzeczewska from Team Andrzej.

=== Season 3 (2022) ===
The third season of the show premiered on January 1, 2022. Alicja Majewska and Witold Paszt returned as the coaches in the third season, but Andrzej Piaseczny and Izabela Trojanowska were replaced by Maryla Rodowicz and Piotr Cugowski, as new coaches. The show was hosted by Rafał Brzozowski and Marta Manowska. The winner of the third series was Krzysztof Prusik from Team Witold.

=== Season 4 (2023) ===
The fourth season of the show premiered on January 7, 2023. On August 16, 2022, it was announced that Maryla Rodowicz and Piotr Cugowski would return as the coaches, meanwhile Alicja Majewska and Witold Paszt would be replaced by Alicja Węgorzewska and Tomasz Szczepanik as a new coaches. The show was hosted by Rafał Brzozowski and Małgorzata Tomaszewska, who replaced Marta Manowska. The winner of the fourth series was Zbigniew Zaranek from Team Maryla.

=== Season 5 (2024) ===
The fifth season premiered on 6 January 2024. On August 15, 2023, it was announced that Rodowicz, Szczepanik and Węgorzewska would return as coaches for their third, second and second season, respectively, joined by a new coach Halina Frąckowiak, who replaced Cugowski. The show will be hosted by Marta Manowska, replacing Małgorzata Tomaszewska, and Rafał Brzozowski. The winner of the fifth series was Regina Rosłaniec-Bavcevic from Team Halina.

=== Season 6 (2025) ===
The sixth season premiered on 4 January 2025. On 11 August 2024, it was announced that Marta Manowska would reprise her role as the main host, alongside Robert Stockinger, who is set to make his debut as the second main host in the upcoming season. On 12 August 2024, Andrzej Piaseczny was announced to be returning as a coach after a three-year hiatus. At the same time, Robert Janowski, Małgorzata Ostrowska, and Tatiana Okupnik, were announced to debut coaches. The winner of the sixth series was Wojciech Bardowski from Team Robert.

=== Season 7 (2026) ===
The seventh season premiered on 3 January 2026. Łukasz Nowicki is set to replace Robert Stockinger and join Marta Manowska as the main host. On August 10, 2025, it was announced that Majka Jeżowska would join the coaching panel as the new coach. On August 11, 2025, it was announced that Andrzej Piaseczny, Robert Janowski, and Alicja Majewska would be the Majka Jeżowska coaches for the season. The winner of the seventh series was Violetta Kapcewicz from Team Andrzej. With Kapcewicz's win, Piaseczny became the first coach on The Voice Senior to win multiple seasons.
