= What on Earth =

What on Earth may refer to:

- What on Earth! (film), a 1966 National Film Board of Canada animated short co-directed by Les Drew and Kaj Pindal
- What on Earth (Canadian game show), a Canadian quiz and talk show series which aired on CBC Television from 1971 to 1975
- What on Earth? (U.S. TV program), an American television program which debuted on Science Channel in 2015
- What on Earth Publishing, a British publisher founded by Christopher Lloyd
