= Maryla Rodowicz =

Polish singer, guitarist and actress

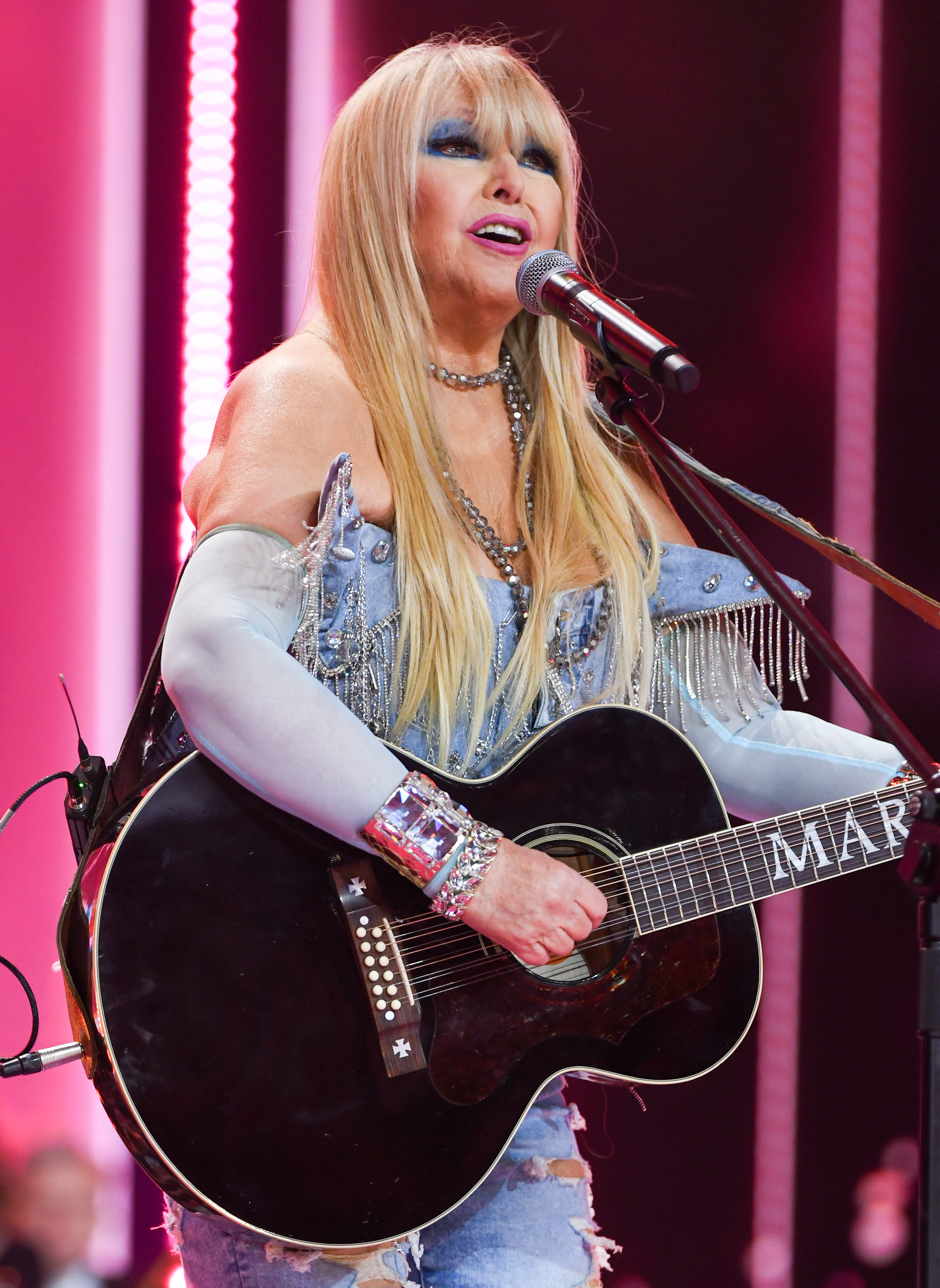
- Rodowicz in 2023
- Born: Maria Antonina Rodowicz; 8 December 1945 (age 80); Zielona Góra, Poland
- Occupations: Singer; guitarist; actress
- Years active: 1962–present
- Musical career
- Genres: Pop; Rock; Folk music; Sung poetry
- Instrument: Acoustic guitar
- Labels: Sony BMG Music Entertainment Poland; Polskie Nagrania Muza; PolyGram Polska; Universal Music Polska; Sony Music Entertainment Poland
- Website: www.marylarodowicz.pl

Maria Antonina Rodowicz, known professionally as Maryla Rodowicz, (Polish pronunciation: [maˈrɨla rɔˈdɔvit͡ʂ] born 8 December 1945 in Zielona Góra), is a Polish singer, guitarist and actress.

Throughout over 60 years of her career, she released twenty Polish and four foreign-language studio albums including five with platinum and three with gold certifications and selling over 15 million records. Known for her close collaboration with Agnieszka Osiecka and Seweryn Krajewski, her most popular songs include "Małgośka" (1974), "Futbol" (1974), "Remedium" (1978), "Niech żyje bal" (1984), "Łatwopalni" (1997) and "Wszyscy chcą kochać" (2005). She remains one of the most prominent and successful artists in the history of popular music in Poland.

Among the numerous awards and decorations she received are Gold Cross of Merit, Commander's Cross of the Order of Polonia Restituta and Gold Medal for Merit to Culture – Gloria Artis.

== Early life ==
Originally the Rodowicz family came from Vilnius. Her father worked at the Stefan Batory University in Vilnius before the Second World War and her grandparents were the owners of a pharmacy near the famous Gate of Dawn. Rodowicz studied at Liceum Ziemi Kujawskiej (Cuiavian Land High School) in Włocławek and graduated from the Akademia Wychowania Fizycznego (Academy of Physical Education) in Rumpe. In her youth, she was a keen participant in athletics among other things at Kujawiak Włocławek.

== Career ==
Her career began in 1967, after winning first prize at the Festiwal Piosenki i Piosenkarzy Studenckich (Student Songs and Singers' Festival) in Kraków. Two years later she recorded her first well-known song, "Mówiły mu" ("The girls told him", English version known as "Love Doesn't Grow On Trees"), and in 1970 – her first longplay. In 1973, she gained popularity with the song "Małgośka" with lyrics by Agnieszka Osiecka. A year later, during the World Cup Opening Ceremony in Munich, she performed a song "Futbol" ("Football").

The singer's body of work comprises over 600 recorded songs, with over 20 Polish albums as well as albums in English, Czech, German and Russian. Apart from "Małgośka", the artist's most famous songs are "Niech żyje bal" ("Long live the ball"), "To już było" ("Done that"), "Wielka Woda" ("Great water"), "Rozmowa przez ocean" ("Talk over the ocean"), "Bossanova do poduszki" ("Bedside bossa nova"), "Łatwopalni" ("Inflammables") and her latest album's hits such as "Wszyscy chcą kochać" ("Everybody wants to love") and "Będzie co ma być" ("What is to be, will be"). In 2005 she recorded an album Kochać (To love) with lyrics by Katarzyna Nosowska. On the occasion of World Cup 2006, she recorded a song "Za Janasa" ("For Janas") with Nosowska's lyrics.

Rodowicz has performed in concert worldwide: in Europe, America, Australia, and Asia. She has won awards for her singing. She has also participated in various festivals including outside the borders of Poland, for example in Oklahoma City, Tulsa, and Los Angeles, as well as in Poland including the Festiwal Piosenki i Piosenkarzy Studenckich (Student Songs and Singers' Festival) in Kraków and the National Festival of Polish Song in Opole.

Rodowicz is also an actress who has performed in several movies and in musical entertainment. She regularly performed in a Polsat TV channel series Rodzina zastępcza (Foster Family).

In 1992 she released her autobiography under the title of Niech żyje bal.

She was featured in a 2012 episode of the Polish Name That Tune, known as Jaka to Melodia, in which she sang her rendition of the popular Chór Czejanda number Czerwony Autobus ("The Red Bus") after a celebrity contestant guessed the song.

On August 18, 2021, it was announced that she will appear in the third season of The Voice Senior as a coach, replacing Izabela Trojanowska. Her life and music career was the subject of a documentary film entitled Maryla. Tak kochałam aired by TVP1 channel in December the same year.

== Songs ==
The notable Polish Madonna written by Agnieszka Osiecka (an emotional portrait of an average Polish woman trying to make ends meet) contains clear Catholic symbolism and references to the social circumstances characteristic to Poland in the late eighties that marked the last years of the communist era in Poland. In this song, the author questions whether the "Polish Madonna" (or, in other words, the Catholic Holy Mary, usually portrayed as holding baby Jesus in her arms) has enough money to pay for rent, promising her that the child will get a welcome allowance to the public kindergarten. The old communist promises are never fulfilled for her, and her dreams of having a lipstick "made in France" can only come true in her dreams. The song won the journalists' prize at the Opole festival in 1987.

== Personal life ==
In mid-1970s, she was in a highly publicized relationship with actor Daniel Olbrychski. She has three children, Jan Jasiński (born in 1979) and Katarzyna Jasińska (born in 1982) with her partner and later husband, Krzysztof Jasiński. She also has a son Jędrzej (born in 1987) with her (now divorced) second husband, Andrzej Dużyński.

== Discography ==
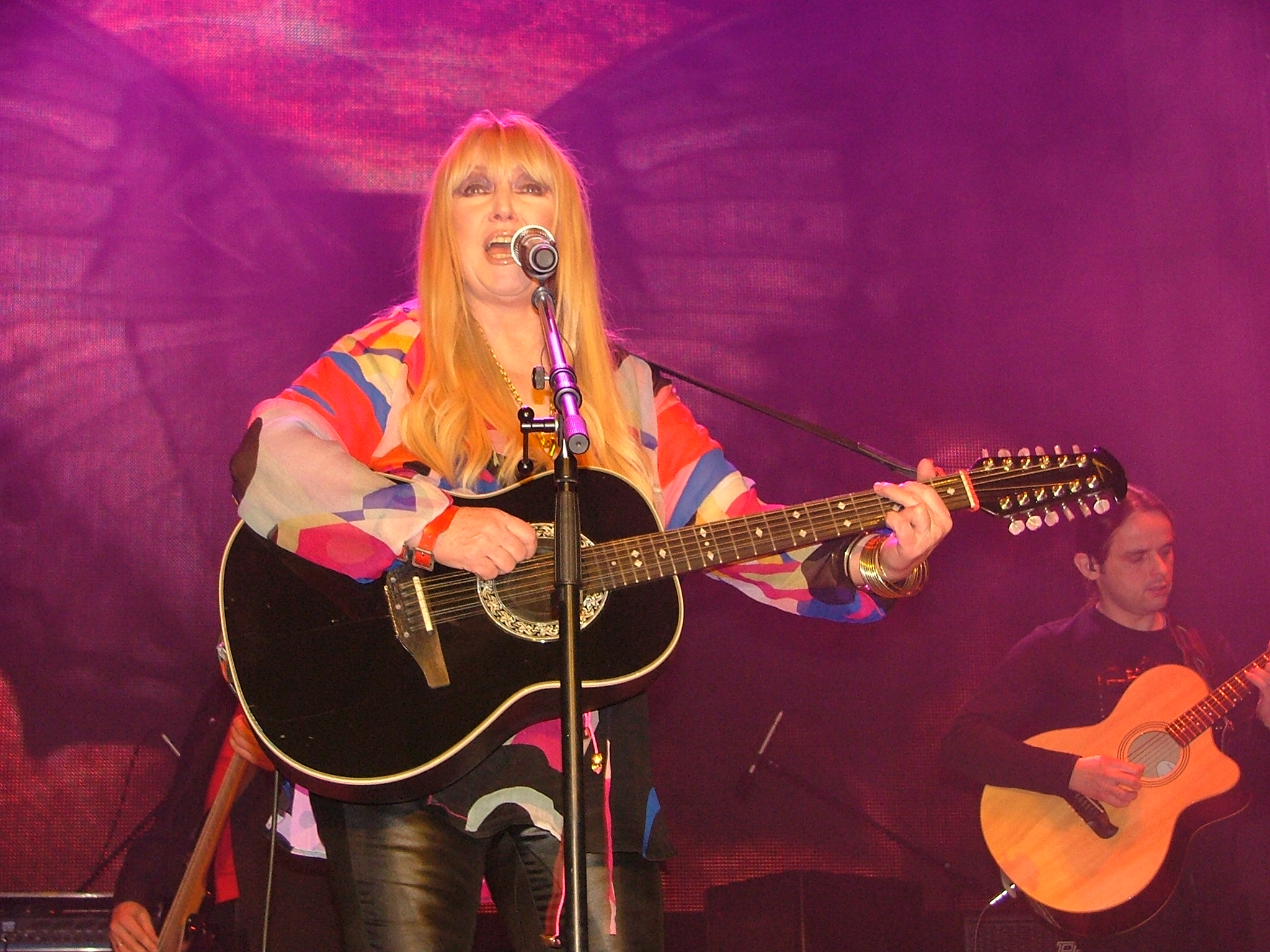
Rodowicz in Warsaw, 2007

=== Polish-language albums ===
Title	Album details	Peak chart positions	Sales	Certifications
Title	Album details	POL	Sales	Certifications
Żyj mój świecie	Released: 1970; Label: Polskie Nagrania Muza; Formats: LP, CD, digital download	—	POL: 160,000+	POL: Gold
Wyznanie	Released: 1972; Label: Pronit; Formats: LP, CD, digital download	—		
Rok	Released: 1974; Label: Pronit; Formats: LP, CD, digital download	—		
Sing-Sing	Released: 1976; Label: Pronit; Formats: LP, CD, digital download	—		
Wsiąść do pociągu	Released: 1978; Label: Pronit; Formats: LP, CD, digital download	—	POL: 160,000+	POL: Gold
Cyrk nocą	Released: 1979; Label: Pronit; Formats: LP, CD, digital download	—		
Święty spokój	Released: 1982; Label: Polskie Nagrania Muza; Formats: LP, CD, digital download	—		
Był sobie król	Released: 1984; Label: Polton; Formats: LP, CD, digital download	—		
Gejsza nocy	Released: 1986; Label: Polskie Nagrania Muza; Formats: LP, CD, digital download	—		
Polska Madonna	Released: 1987; Label: Polskie Nagrania Muza; Formats: LP, CD, digital download	—		
Full	Released: 1991; Label: Polton; Formats: LP, CD	—		
Absolutnie nic	Released: 1992; Label: Polskie Nagrania Muza; Formats: LP, CD, digital download	—		
Złota Maryla	Released: 1995; Label: Tra-La-La; Formats: CD, digital download	—		
Marysia biesiadna	Released: 1995; Label: Tra-la-la; Formats: CD	—	POL: 100,000+	POL: Gold
Przed zakrętem	Released: 1998; Label: PolyGram Poland; Formats: CD, digital download	—	POL: 50,000+	POL: Gold
Karnawał 2000	Released: November 22, 1999; Label: Universal Music Poland; Formats: CD, digital download	—		
Życie ładna rzecz	Released: November 8, 2002; Label: Universal Music Poland; Formats: CD, digital download	—		
Maryla i przyjaciele	Released: January 12, 2004; Label: Polskie Radio; Formats: CD	—		
Kochać	Released: September 23, 2005; Label: Sony BMG; Formats: CD, digital download	5	POL: 30,000+	POL: Platinum
Jest cudnie	Released: May 12, 2008; Label: Sony BMG; Formats: CD, digital download	2	POL: 30,000+	POL: Platinum
50	Released: November 22, 2010; Label: Universal Music Poland; Formats: CD, digital download	3	POL: 30,000+	POL: Platinum
Buty 2^{[a]}	Released: November 25, 2011; Label: Universal Music Poland; Formats: CD, digital download	16	POL: 30,000+	POL: Platinum
Ach świecie	Released: September 15, 2017; Label: Sony Music Poland; Formats: CD, digital download			
"—" denotes a recording that did not chart or was not released in that territory.

=== German-language albums ===
Title	Album details
Maryla Rodowicz	Released: 1973; Label: Amiga; Formats: LP
Die Grossen Erfolge	Released: 2007; Label: Amiga; Formats: CD

=== Russian-language albums ===
Title	Album details
Maryla Rodowicz	Released: 1984; Label: Melodia; Formats: LP

=== Multilingual albums ===
Title	Album details	Notes
Maryla Rodowiczova	Released: 1972; Label: Supraphon; Formats: LP	released in Czechoslovakia

=== Tribute albums ===
Title	Album details
Tribute To Agnieszka Osiecka. Łatwopalni	Released: June 28, 1997; Label: PolyGram Poland; Formats: CD

=== Christmas albums ===
Title	Album details	Notes
12 najpiękniejszych kolęd	Released: 2001; Label: Universal Music Poland; Formats: CD	Pani Domu magazine insert

=== Live albums ===
Title	Album details	Peak chart positions	Sales	Certifications
Title	Album details	POL	Sales	Certifications
Niebieska Maryla	Released: September 14, 2000; Label: Universal Music Poland; Formats: CD	10	POL: 50,000+	POL: Gold
"—" denotes a recording that did not chart or was not released in that territory.

=== Compilation albums ===
Title	Album details	Sales	Certifications
Antologia 1	Released: October 19, 1996; Label: Universal Music Poland; Formats: CD	POL: 100,000+	POL: Gold
Antologia 2	Released: October 19, 1996; Label: Universal Music Poland; Formats: CD		
Antologia 3	Released: October 19, 1996; Label: Universal Music Poland; Formats: CD		
Maryla Rodowicz, Rarytasy Cz. I (1967–1970)	Released: November 5, 2012; Label: Universal Music Poland; Formats: CD, digital download		
Maryla Rodowicz, Rarytasy Cz. II (1970–1973)	Released: December 4, 2012; Label: Universal Music Poland; Formats: CD, digital download		
Maryla Rodowicz, Rarytasy Cz. III (1974–1977)	Released: March 19, 2013; Label: Universal Music Poland; Formats: CD, digital download		
Maryla Rodowicz, Rarytasy Cz. IV (1977–1982)	Released: April 16, 2013; Label: Universal Music Poland; Formats: CD, digital download		
Maryla Rodowicz, Rarytasy Cz. V (Lata 80-te cz. I)	Released: May 28, 2013; Label: Universal Music Poland; Formats: CD, digital download		
Maryla Rodowicz, Rarytasy Cz. VI (Lata 80-te cz. II)	Released: May 28, 2013; Label: Universal Music Poland; Formats: CD, digital download		
Maryla Rodowicz, Rarytasy Cz. VII (1990–2000)	Released: August 6, 2013; Label: Universal Music Poland; Formats: CD, digital download		

== See also ==
- Music of Poland
- List of Polish music artists

== Notes ==
a. Re-released as 2 CD set on October 23, 2012 under title Buty 2 1/2.
