= Angus Lloyd =

Angus Lloyd may refer to:

- Angus Lloyd (businessman)
- Angus Lloyd (rugby union)
