= Witold Paszt =

Polish singer (1953–2022)

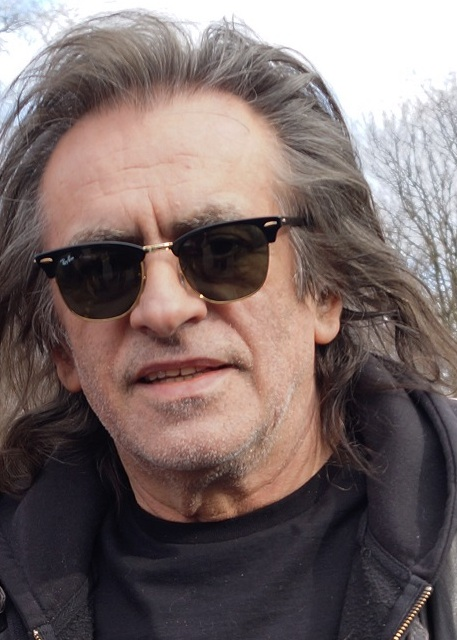
- Paszt in 2019
- Born: Witold Stefan Paszt; 1 September 1953; Zamość, Poland
- Died: 18 February 2022 (aged 68); Zamość, Poland
- Occupation: Singer
- Years active: 1977–2022
- Spouse: Marta Paszt (died 2018)
- Children: Aleksandra, Natalia
- Musical career
- Genres: Pop
- Formerly of: Vox

Witold Stefan Paszt (1 September 1953 – 18 February 2022) was a Polish singer, founder and vocalist of the Vox band.

== Career ==
Born in Zamość, Poland, Paszt began his musical career in 1977, in the Victoria Singers group he founded. In 1978, he founded the band Vox, with which he released several albums: Vox (1979), Monte Carlo Is Great (1981), Sing, sing, sing (1986), Vox 2 (1989), The greatest hits (1993), The Best of Vox (1994), Wonderful Journey (1996) and Fashion and Love (1998). It was a male vocal quartet composed of: Andrzej Kozioł, Ryszard Rynkowski (who started his solo career in 1987) and cousins: Witold Paszt and Jerzy Słota. They played dozens of concerts in Poland, and also gave concerts in the Netherlands, Sweden, the United States and Cuba.

In the spring of 2005, Paszt participated in the first edition of the TVN entertainment program Dancing with the Stars. Hand in hand with Anna Głogowska, he took second place in the final.

In 2021 and 2022, he was one of the coaches of the second edition of The Voice Senior on TVP2. The finale of his second season took place thirteen days before his death.

== Personal life ==
He was married to Marta Paszt (died 2018), with whom he had two daughters (Aleksandra and Natalia). He lived in Warsaw and Zamość.

== Death ==
He died on 18 February 2022, at the age of 68, in Zamość. According to information provided by his family, Paszt struggled with serious complications from COVID-19 after contracting it a third time. On 18 March 2022, the artist's ashes were buried in the Zamość Municipal Cemetery.

== Filmography ==
- 2005: Lonely Hearts Clinic as himself
- 2016: A wedding in a cottage as the King of the Gypsies
- 2017: Stars as Géza Kalocsay
- 2018: Singles Planet 2 as himself
