= Christopher Lloyd (gardener) =

English gardener and writer (1921–2006)

- Born: 2 March 1921; Northiam, East Sussex, United Kingdom
- Died: 27 January 2006 (aged 84); Hastings, United Kingdom
- Other names: Christo
- Education: Wellesley House; Rugby School; King's College, Cambridge; Wye College
- Notable work: The Mixed Border; The Well-Tempered Garden; Exotic Planting for Adventurous Gardeners

Christopher "Christo" Hamilton Lloyd, OBE (2 March 1921 – 27 January 2006) was an English gardener and a gardening author of note, as the 20th-century chronicler for thickly planted, labour-intensive country gardening.

== Life ==
Lloyd was born in Great Dixter, into an upper-middle-class family, the youngest of six children. In 1910, his father, Nathaniel Lloyd, an Arts and Crafts architect, author, printer and designer of posters and other images for confectionery firms,), bought Great Dixter, a manor house in Northiam, East Sussex near the south coast of England. Edwin Lutyens was hired to renovate and extend the house and advise on the structure of the garden. Nathaniel Lloyd loved gardens, designed some of this one himself, and passed that love on to his son. Lloyd learned the skills required of a gardener from his mother Daisy, who did the actual gardening and introduced him as a young boy to Gertrude Jekyll, who was a considerable influence on Lloyd, in particular with respect to "mixed borders". His mother Daisy, to whom he had remained close his entire life, died at Great Dixter on 9 June 1972, aged 91.

After Wellesley House (Broadstairs) and Rugby School, he attended King's College, Cambridge, where he read modern languages before entering the Army during World War II. After the war he received his bachelors in Horticulture from Wye College, University of London, in 1950. He stayed on there as an assistant lecturer in horticulture until 1954.

In 1954, Lloyd moved home to Great Dixter and set up a nursery specialising in unusual plants. He regularly opened the house and gardens to the public. Lloyd did not do all of the gardening himself, but, like his parents, employed a staff of gardeners. In 1991, Fergus Garrett became his head gardener, and continued in that role after Lloyd's death.

In 1979 Lloyd received the Victoria Medal of Honour, the highest award of the Royal Horticultural Society, for his promotion of gardening and his extensive work on their Floral Committee. In 1996, Lloyd was awarded an honorary doctorate from the Open University. In 2000, he was appointed as an officer of the Order of the British Empire.

Today, the Garden is run by a trust under the direction of Fergus Garrett.

== Family ==
Lloyd was a great-grandson of Edwin Wilkins Field, a law-reforming solicitor, and the great-uncle of Christopher Lloyd, the author of numerous non-fiction books, including the popular What on Earth? Happened from the Big Bang to the Present Day and a series of children's historical Wallbook titles.

== Philosophy ==
Lloyd was firmly rooted in the Arts and Crafts style of garden. In most ways he was, like his mother and Gertrude Jekyll, a practical gardener. He said "I couldn't design a garden. I just go along and carp." Despite his extensive work with flowers, he had an appreciation for the garden as a whole. He also understood human nature. One professional gardener likes to quote Lloyd from his book Foliage Plants on how "it is an indisputable fact that appreciation of foliage comes at a later stage in our education, if it comes at all."

== Works ==
Lloyd rapidly felt the need to share his gardening discoveries and published The Mixed Border in 1957, which was followed by Clematis in 1965, and The Well-Tempered Garden in 1970. Lloyd had begun a book on the use of exotic plants in British gardens when he died. This his gardening friends and colleagues completed as Exotic Planting for Adventurous Gardeners in 2007.

In Meadows at Great Dixter and Beyond, published in 2004, Lloyd explored the use of meadow land around his own house.
