= Géza Kalocsay =

Footballer (1913–2008)

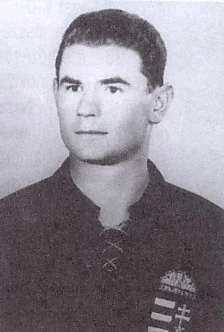
- Kalocsay in 1940

Personal information
- Date of birth: 30 May 1913
- Place of birth: Beregszász, Austria-Hungary
- Date of death: 26 September 2008 (aged 95)
- Place of death: Budapest, Hungary
- Position: Striker

Senior career*
Years	Team	Apps	(Gls)
1932–1937	Sparta Prague		
1937–1939	Olympique Lillois		
1939–1940	Kispest FC	21	(10)
1940–1941	Ferencváros	17	(8)
1941–1943	Újpest	35	(17)
1944	Ungvár	1	(0)
1946–1947	Szentlőrinci AC	1	(0)

International career
1933–1935	Czechoslovakia	3	(0)
1940	Hungary	2	(0)

Managerial career
- 1952: Debreceni Lokomotív
- 1953: Szegedi Honvéd
- 1954–1955: Vasas Izzó
- 1954–1955: Hungary (assistant)
- 1956: Pécs
- 1957–1958: Partizan
- 1958–1961: Standard Liège
- 1961–1962: Újpesti Dózsa SC
- 1963–1965: NA Hussein Dey
- 1966–1969: Górnik Zabrze
- 1970: Ferencváros
- 1971–1972: Videoton
- 1972–1974: MTK Hungaria
- 1976: Pakistan
- 1980–1982: El Ahly
Medal record
Representing Czechoslovakia
Men's football
FIFA World Cup
Runner-up	1934 Italy
- * Club domestic league appearances and goals

Géza Kalocsay (30 May 1913 – 26 September 2008) was a footballer and manager from Hungary who played internationally for both Czechoslovakia (3 caps) and Hungary (2 caps).

At the time of his death in September 2008 at the age of 95, he was the last surviving player to have represented either Czechoslovakia or Hungary before the Second World War.

== Early life ==
Géza was born on 30 May 1913 in Beregszász, Austria-Hungary. Together with his younger brother, he started his career in the local high school team until 1932.

== Club career ==
After Subcarpathia was annexed to Czechoslovakia when he was young, he had the opportunity to play for various national clubs. At the age of 19 in 1932, he was transferred to Sparta Prague. During his five years in the team, he won the Czechoslovak First League 1936, three times silver medalist and winner of the Central European Cup. In addition during his professional career in Prague, he studied law at the Charles University, and then finally earned a doctorate.

In 1937, he moved to French club Olympique Lillois. He finished as runner-ups with the team at the Championnat de France. In 1939, he moved to Hungary club Kispest, and after one season, he signed a contract with Ferencvárosi, and became league champion with the team.

He then played for several clubs in the Hungarian championship namely Újpest FC, Ungvár and Szentlőrinci AC.

== International career ==
=== Czechoslovakia ===
From 1933 till 1935, he made three appearances with the Czechoslovakia national team. He also participated as a reserve in the 1934 FIFA World Cup in Italy. He did not made any appearance at the tournament, competing with Antonín Puc at his position.

=== Hungary ===
He joined the Hungarian national team while still a player of Kispest. He made his debut on 31 March 1940, giving an assist to György Sárosi, and helped the team beat Switzerland by 3-0. He played for the second time against Germany a week later in Berlin, which ended in a 2-2 draw. He made two appearances for Hungary national team.

== Coaching career ==
He was lured away from working in the legal field by Gusztáv Sebes to become a coach. In his initial years, he coached local clubs such as Nyíregyházi Madisz, Pápai Perutz, Debreceni Lokomotiv, Szeged Honvéd, Vasas Izzó and Pécs Dózsa, and after 1957 he began moving abroad.

He first coached Yugoslavian FK Partizan, followed by Belgian Standard Liege, Algerian side NA Hussein Dey, and the Polish Górnik Zabrze. In his final years, he coached the Pakistan national team also taking part at the inaugural at the 1976 Quaid-e-Azam International Tournament. Later on, he coached Egyptian side Al-Ahli. He also returned to his home country several times to coach Újpesti Dózsa SC, Ferencvárosi, Videoton, and MTK Hungaria until his retirement in 1981.

As a coach, he won league titles in Belgium, Poland and twice in Egypt, and had several spells leading them to finish runner-ups in various tournaments.

== Personal life ==
His wife lived in his hometown Beregszász, which now belongs to the independent Ukraine. The town also elected him an honorary citizen in 1998.

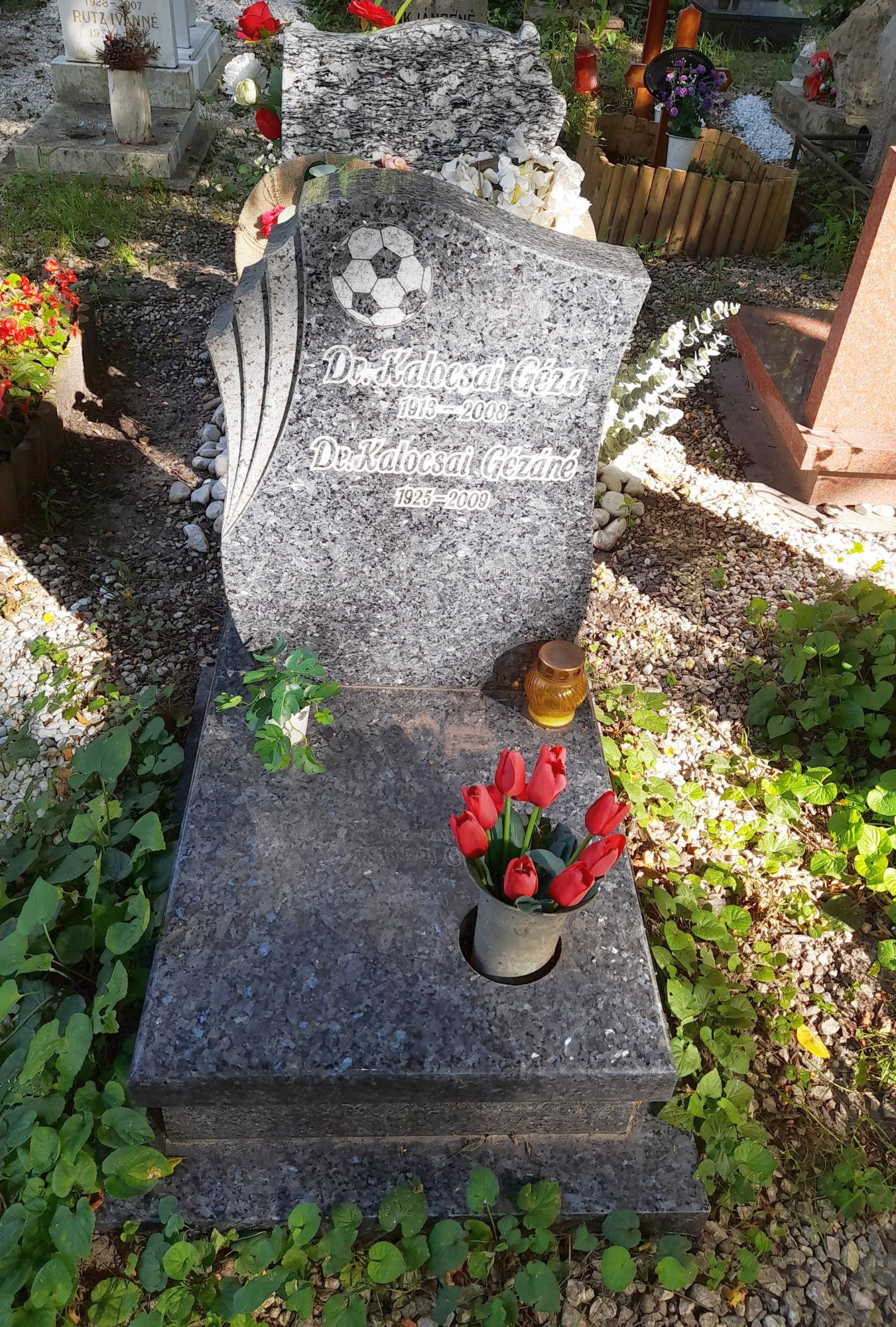
Grave of Kalocsay in Budapest

Kalocsay died on 26 September 2008, at the age of 95.

== In popular culture ==
In the Polish film Stars (Polish: Gwiazdy) from 2017, he was portrayed by Witold Paszt.

== Honours ==
=== Player ===
Ferencváros

- Nemzeti Bajnokság I: 1940–41

=== Manager ===
Górnik Zabrze

- Ekstraklasa: 1966–67
- Polish Cup: 1967–68, 1968–69
