= Kar2ouche =

- Developer: Immersive Education
- Release: 2001
- Available in: English
- Type: Educational software

Kar2ouche was an educational software product developed by Immersive Education, a joint project between Oxford University and Intel that started in 1999. In 2001, Kar2ouche won the British Educational Suppliers Association (BESA) Educational Resource Award for ICT.

Immersive Education was founded by Ian Maber, ex-Creative Director for Sony Psygnosis and later Creative Director for Elixir Game Studios.
