= Izabela Trojanowska =

Polish singer and film actress (born 1955)

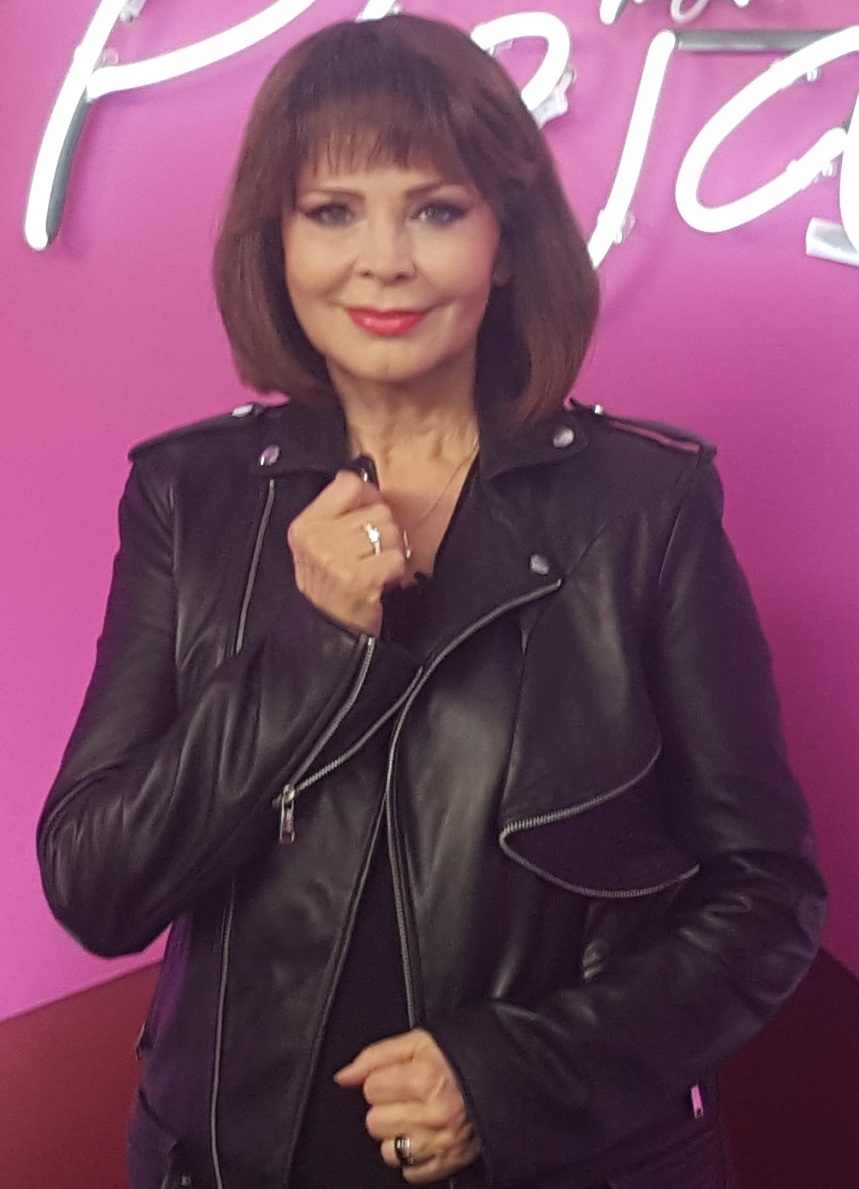
- Trojanowska in 2017
- Born: Izabela Ludwika Schütz; 22 April 1955 (age 71); Olsztyn, Poland
- Occupations: Singer, actress
- Spouse: Marek Trojanowski
- Children: 1
- Musical career
- Genres: Rock, pop rock, new wave
- Years active: 1971–present
- Labels: Tonpress, EMI Music Poland, Agencja Artystyczna MTJ, Universal Music Polska
- Website: www.izabelatrojanowska.pl

Izabela Ludwika Trojanowska (née Schütz; born 22 April 1955) is a Polish rock singer and actress performing in theatre, TV series and films. She is best known for her 1980 hits "Tyle samo prawd ile kłamstw" and "Wszystko czego dziś chcę", and her role in the popular Polish soap opera Klan.

== Background and early life ==
Izabela was born in Olsztyn, North-East Poland as a daughter of Zofia and Maksymilian Schütz. She grew up with two brothers: two years older Maksymilian and two years younger Roman. Her uncle was Polish-born, UK-based fashion designer Henri Strzelecki.

== Career ==
In May 1971, she performed at a religious music contest Sacrosong in Chorzów where she won an award, presented to her by Karol Wojtyła – future Pope John Paul II. The following month, she took part in the National Festival of Polish Song in Opole with the song "O czym marzą zakochani" where she also received an award. Between 1974 and 1978, she studied at a musical drama school in Gdynia. During that time, she appeared in a number of theatre plays and performed with Greek band Prometheus in East Germany. In 1979, Trojanowska began acting in stage plays at the Syrena Theatre in Warsaw. Later that year, she made her television debut in miniseries Strachy where she played the lead role. The following year, she appeared in another TV miniseries, Kariera Nikodema Dyzmy.

Trojanowska rose to nationwide fame in 1980 with the hit songs "Tyle samo prawd ile kłamstw" and "Wszystko czego dziś chcę", both performed to much success at the 18th National Festival of Polish Song with the popular Polish rock band Budka Suflera. With her distinctive femme fatale image and new wave sound, she immediately became a teenage idol and one of the most popular acts of the early 1980s in Poland. Later in 1980, she played the title role in a television play Carmilla. Her debut full-length album, Iza, was released in February 1981 by Tonpress, with Budka Suflera as the backing band. All songs were composed by the band's keyboardist Romuald Lipko and all lyrics written by Andrzej Mogielnicki. Trojanowska subsequently teamed up with another rock band, Stalowy Bagaż, with whom she performed the songs "Na bohaterów popyt minął" and "Pieśń o cegle" at the National Festival of Polish Song in June 1981. Their performance caused controversies for the singer donning a red tie on stage, which was commonly worn by members of the Polish Socialist Youth Union, and the organisation accused her of profaning their uniform. Later that year, she released an EP with Stalowy Bagaż and appeared in one episode of crime TV series 07 zgłoś się.

In 1982, Trojanowska released her second LP, Układy. The album showcased a rockier sound and spawned further hits "Brylanty" and "Karmazynowa noc". Later that year, she collaborated with Tadeusz Nalepa on the album Pożegnalny cyrk, whose politically charged lyrics strongly criticized martial law in Poland and the country's communist government. The record was shelved by the censorship office of the Polish People's Republic and officially released eleven years later. She also appeared in historical TV series Blisko, coraz bliżej. In September 1982, Izabela and her husband went to the Netherlands where she played several concerts, and subsequently travelled to West Germany. When the Polish Consulate refused to renew their passports, the couple decided to remain abroad and settled in Cologne. In Poland, Trojanowska became the subject of unfavourable press, intentionally fabricated by the hostile government. In 1985, she performed concerts for the Polish community in Chicago and New York, and released two English-language singles on the German market, "One by One" and "Goodbye". In 1987, the singer and her husband relocated to West Berlin.

At the end of 1988, Trojanowska visited Poland for the first time in six years, and the following year she recorded material for her new, English-language album. After showcasing the new material live at the 1990 Sopot International Song Festival, the self-titled CD was released in 1991 by ZPR Records. It was not a commercial success, spawning only a minor radio hit "Independence Day". In 1992, the album was re-released in Canada by Continuum Records, and retitled Independence. In 1994, she took part in a tour with Budka Suflera, commemorating the 20th anniversary of the band's formation. Her next album, Chcę inaczej, was released in autumn 1996 and included a number of moderately popular singles. In 1997, she accepted the role of Monika Ross-Nawrot in the hit soap opera Klan on TVP1 in which she acts to date. In 1999, label Pomaton EMI released a greatest hits compilation, Złota kolekcja – Wszystko czego dziś chcę. Trojanowska recorded a dance music-oriented album with Andrzej Mogielnicki, which was never released due to her dissatisfaction with the material. Only the song "7 nocy bez ciebie" was released as a single in 2001.

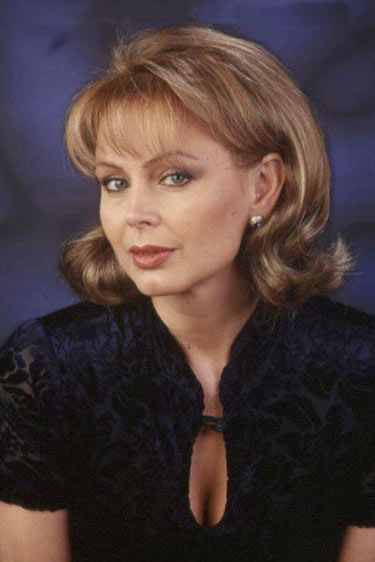
Trojanowska in 2008

In 2006, Agencja Artystyczna MTJ released a new compilation, The Best – Komu więcej, komu mniej, which included five re-recordings of Trojanowska's classic hits. In 2008, she played a role in Polish romantic comedy Fenomen, released two years later, and in 2009, took part in a tour for the 35th anniversary of Budka Suflera. She started collaborating with Polish band Mafia with whom she recorded her next album, Życia zawsze mało, released independently in October 2011. It was promoted by singles "Nie od razu" and "Kochaj mnie za wszystko". 2012 saw her debut as a fashion designer when she premiered clothes collection MonaIza created with Polish designer Monika Natora. In 2014, she performed on the 40th anniversary tour with Budka Suflera.

In November 2016, Trojanowska released the album Na skos, composed by Jan Borysewicz, which musically referenced her early 80s new wave style. It spawned two singles: "Posłańcy wszystkich burz" and "Skos", the latter performed at the National Festival of Polish Song in 2017. She performed at the festival again in 2019, with a new song "Wakacyjna miłość". In 2020, she received her "star" in the walk of fame in Opole and released an autobiography titled Trojanowska, on which she worked with journalist Leszek Gnoiński. In early 2021, she became a coach in the second season of Polish edition of The Voice Senior.

== Private life ==
In September 1979, Izabela married mathematician Marek Trojanowski, and their daughter Roxanna was born in June 1991. Trojanowska shares her time between Berlin and Warsaw.

She is an avid angler and has taken part in angling contests in Poland since 2007.

== Discography ==
=== Studio albums ===
- 1981: Iza
- 1982: Układy
- 1990: Izabela Trojanowska
- 1993: Pożegnalny cyrk (with Tadeusz Nalepa)
- 1996: Chcę inaczej
- 2011: Życia zawsze mało
- 2016: Na skos

=== Compilations ===
- 1991: The Best of Izabela Trojanowska
- 1999: Złota kolekcja – Wszystko czego dziś chcę
- 2006: The Best – Komu więcej, komu mniej
- 2007: Platynowe przeboje – Sobie na złość
- 2007: Gwiazdy polskiej muzyki lat 80.
- 2015: Bursztynowa kolekcja – The Very Best of Izabela Trojanowska
- 2017: Empik prezentuje: Dobre bo polskie

== Filmography ==
=== Films ===
- 1980: Carmilla as Carmilla
- 1982: A száztizenegyes as Olga Komarowska and Vera Komarowska
- 2010: Fenomen as Hania
- 2018: Juliusz as star

=== TV series ===
- 1979: Strachy as Teresa Sikorzanka
- 1980: Kariera Nikodema Dyzmy as Kasia Kunicka
- 1981: 07 zgłoś się as Joanna Borewicz
- 1983: Blisko, coraz bliżej as Hildegarda Belsche
- 1997–present: Klan as Monika Ross-Nawrot
- 2019: Barwy szczęścia as jury member
