= Halina Frąckowiak =

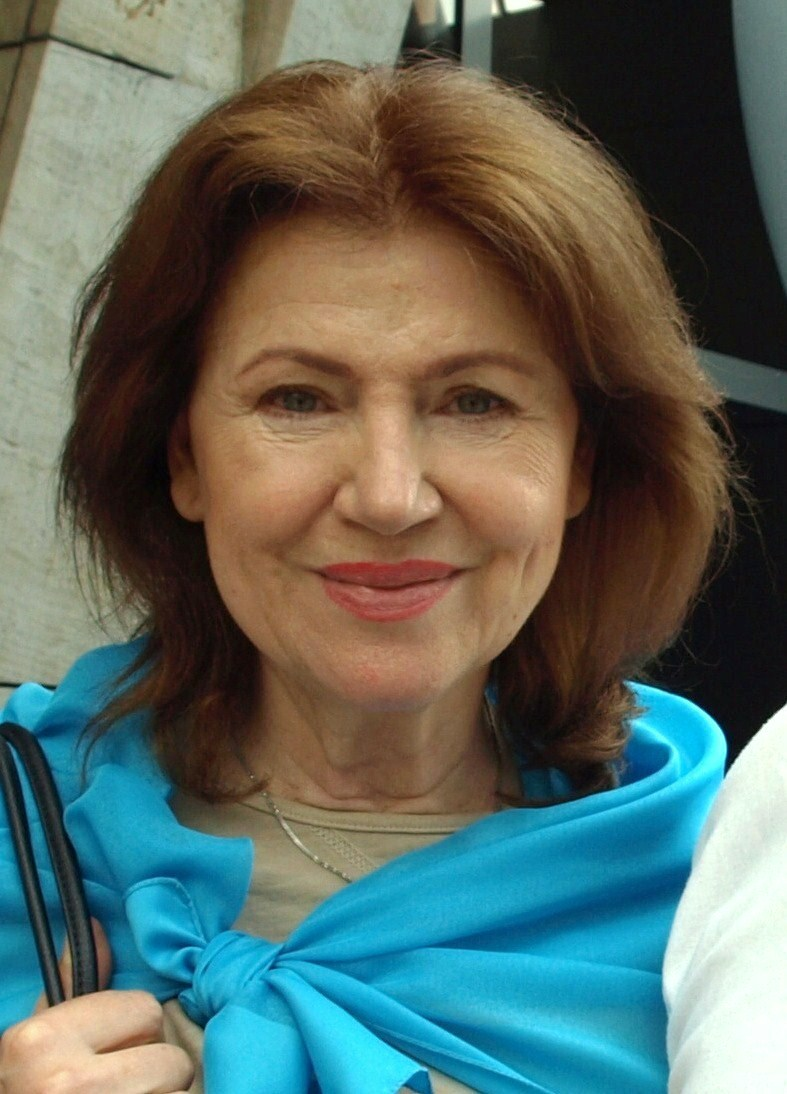
- Frąckowiak in 2013

Background information
- Also known as: Sonia Sulin
- Born: Halina Maria Frąckowiak; 10 April 1947 (age 79)
- Genres: pop

Halina Maria Frąckowiak (born 10 April 1947 in Poznań) is a Polish pop and rock singer, composer and author. She rose to fame during Poland's 1970s funk scene. In 1974 she released her first album "Idę" on Warner Music / WMI. After wards she released albums such as "Geira" in 1977 which reflected the atmosphere and style of Poland.

== Career ==
She made her debut on 10 April 1963 (her 16th birthday), as a student of the Technical Secondary School of Economics, at the Railway House in Poznań, as part of the qualifying rounds for the 2nd Festival of Young Talents. She actually came to the "Czerwono-Czarni" concert, and since the qualifying participants entered for free, her friend decided that "Halinka should go to the competition". She sang "Mister wonderful" from the repertoire of L. Jakubczak, qualifying for the next stage and receiving an offer of joint concerts with "Czerwono-Czarni", which she took advantage of. She reached the finals of Young Talents in Szczecin, where she sang "I'm sorry" by Brenda Lee. She was among the Golden Ten Winners, alongside K. Sobczyk, Z. Sośnicka, M. Wróblewska, M. Kubasińska, and T. Nalepa.

In May 1964, she began performing at the Gdańsk Shipyard Club STER with Ryszard Poznakowski's "Tony" band. From this period comes a press mention in the weekly "Świat", where the renowned music critic Jerzy Waldorff predicted her great singing career, calling her "the second Demarczyk"...

At the turn of 1965/66 she returned to her hometown of Poznań, joining the "Tarpany" group. On June 6, 1966, she made her first radio recording - a song. "The Shadow and You" (music and lyrics by Klaudiusz Maga). Together with her band, she qualified for the finals of the Spring Teen Music Festival; However, participation in the final did not take place due to previously planned performances in the GDR. A year later, the song "Siała baba mak" won first place in the TV Song Exchange. However, it was not Halina's solo song; in it (together with H. Zytkowiak) she sang backing vocals for another vocalist of "Tarpanów" - E. Hulewicz.

The year 1968 saw cooperation with the group "Drumlersi" organized by the poet E. Bryll and the composer M. Sart, in which Halina performed under the pseudonym SONIA SULIN. This year she performed for the first time at the Polish Song Festival in Opole - pios "For our peaceful home"; she recorded songs for the film "Przygoda z piosenką" ("A donkey was given a manger" and in a duet with B. Łazuka "Be spring to me"), lending her voice to the actress Pola Raksa; Together with M. Napieralski, she composed the song "I'm afraid that you depart", which K. Sobczyk included in her repertoire; she made further radio recordings: "What does gingerbread do to the windmill", "Wymyślłam nas" and "Cwaniara" (the latter song became quite popular). The band referred to the tradition of Polish folk music, the so-called urban folklore, which did not quite coincide with the musical interests of its members, who wanted to play rhythm and blues or soul... This led to the dissolution of the group at the end of the year.

In the spring of 1969, Halina linked her artistic fate with Andrzej Nebeski's newly created ABC group. The group's public debut took place in front of TEM's television cameras; Television Screen of the Young, February 11. The first songs were presented in the broadcast and a plebiscite for the band's name was announced. (At first it was to be called "Grupa O!" after the enthusiastic cry of O! - this is what they play). The audience, probably suggested by one of the songs presented - "Moje ABC" - decided that the group's name was Grupa ABC. Halina's first recording with "ABC" - "Napisz Please" - became a great hit and... the musical showcase of the program at "Studio Rytm". – At the Festival in Opole: in the Premiere Concert - "Czekam tu" won the Polish Radio Award, and in the Jubilee Concert, presenting hits of the old days, they sang "Wesoły train" and "Don't be such a fast Bill", - at the 2nd Festival of Youth Bands for the Golden Award They won the Sopocki Summer 69 Kotwica 3rd prize and the Bronze Kotwica, - they promoted hit after hit; "The Road to the Stars", "I'll Take You with Me", "Oh, I'm Waiting, I'm Waiting", "You Want Too Much", "A Gift from Spring", - Halina continued her composing activities; she wrote the music for "Za poznań nie backwards". The song took second place in the plebiscite for the Song of the Year in 1969.

Today her music can be found on websites such as music.apple.com, Spotify and Amazon music.

In 2008, she recorded a new version of her hit "Papierowy księżyc" alongside the band Muchy.

== Personal life ==
She is associated with the political scientist Józef Szaniawski, with whom she has a son, Filip Frąckowiak.

In 1990, on the way to a concert in Gorzów Wielkopolski, she had a serious road accident in which she broke both her legs and suffered facial harm from broken glass. Although the facial injuries healed relatively quickly with no visible scars, the leg injuries were more serious and required weeks of treatment and months of rehabilitation.

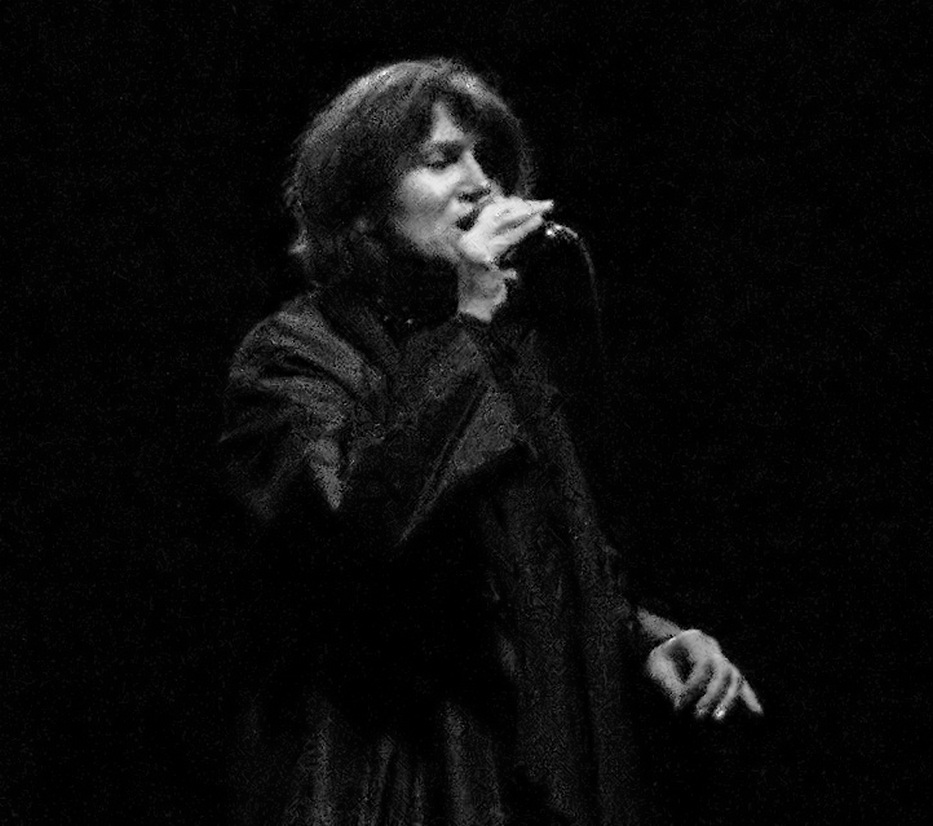
Halina Frąckowiak in 2007

In 2010, she joined a committee endorsing Jarosław Kaczyński for President of Poland.

== Discography ==
- 1974 Idę
- 1977 Geira (backed by SBB)
- 1981 Ogród Luizy (with Józef Skrzek)
- 1983 Serca gwiazd
- 1987 Halina Frąckowiak
- 2005 Przystanek bez drogowskazu… Garaże gwiazd
