= Wallbook =

A Wallbook is a large printed book that is designed also to be mounted on a wall. For example, its design may be concertina folded so it can be read like a book or hung on a wall.

== Etymology ==
The name was coined by Christopher Lloyd (world history author), creator of the 2010 The What on Earth? Wallbook which claims to be the first ever attempt to illustrate the entire history of everything from the Big Bang to the present day on a single timeline.

== Design and contents ==
Reviewing the book for the Telegraph's Family Book Club, the writer Christopher Middleton encapsulates the work as a "7-foot, six-inch-long chart, which starts out some four billion years ago, with the explosion that triggered the Earth’s birth, and ends just a matter of months ago, with the election of Barack Obama and the 2008 financial crisis".

The What on Earth? Wallbook is notable for its use of a logarithmic timescale. At the beginning of the timeline 1 cm represents the passage of 1 billion years but by the end of the timeline the same space accounts for just five years. A total of 12 changes of scale accounts for how the whole of the past can be graphically represented on a single piece of paper.

The wallbook’s 1,000 pictures and captions are arranged into 12 streams of colours which provide the backdrops along which the major events of natural and human history unfold. The section, "Space, Earth, Sky, Sea, Land and Humanity" accounts for the story of evolution while Asia, the Middle East, Europe, the Americas, Africa and Australasia convey the rise and fall of human civilisations.

At the top of the timeline is a series of globes that start by showing the movement of the world’s continental plates but later chart the rise and fall of major human empires.

== Distribution ==
The What on Earth? Wallbook was launched exclusively through The Daily Telegraph newspaper on Saturday 4 September 2010.

== Nomenclature ==
Since the launch of the What on Earth? Wallbook the word wallbook has been defined in Macmillan's Open Dictionary as a new noun meaning: "a large printed book which can be mounted on a wall".
