= Henri Lloyd =

British clothing brand

Henri-Lloyd Limited
- Industry: Clothing manufacturing, Retail
- Founded: 1963
- Founders: Angus Lloyd; Henri Strzelecki
- Headquarters: Manchester, United Kingdom
- Key people: Graham Allen (CEO)
- Products: Clothing
- Owner: Monte Rosa Capital
- Website: henrilloyd.com

Henri Lloyd is a British clothing brand that specialised in sailing apparel and fashion for men and women. Established in Manchester in 1963, the company had 40 stores spanning the UK, Australia, the Middle East, and Europe. In June 2018, the brand, stock and 5 stores were acquired by Swedish investment firm, Aligro Group, and subsequently, the brand underwent a redesign and refocused on European sailors. In 2022 was acquired again by Monte Rosa Capital

== History ==
Henri-Lloyd Limited was founded in 1963 in Manchester by Henri Strzelecki, a Polish soldier who moved to Manchester to study textiles during the war, alongside his partner Angus Lloyd.

A soldier in the Polish Army during World War II, Strzelecki was awarded both Polish and British military medals in 1946. He settled in Manchester at the war's end and studied textiles and design before working with local clothing companies. Known as "Mr Henri" or "Waterproof Henry", Strzelecki was awarded the Member of the Order of the British Empire in 1985. Two Queen's Awards for Export Achievement followed in 1986 and 1987.

=== Innovation ===
Henri Lloyd pioneered the use of new technologies and fabrics such as Bri-Nylon (a nylon fabric that didn't fade - remaining bright) in its early clothing lines. Among its innovations were the first non-corrosive zip made of nylon, the introduction of Velcro closures in waterproof garments, the hand taping of seams as an alternative to varnishing, and the incorporation of Gore-Tex waterproofing.

The use of Gore-Tex alone went through over 22,000 hours of round-the-world testing at sea before it was first sold to customers in Henri Lloyd high-performance breathable foul weather gear in 1994. In 2001, the company's TP3 Reflex Jacket and Hi-Fit Trouser won The DAME Design Award at the Marine Equipment Trade Show in Amsterdam.

=== Pioneers ===
A Henri Lloyd Consort Jacket was worn by Sir Francis Chichester when he became the first person to sail single-handed around the world by the clipper route, and the fastest circumnavigator, in nine months and one day overall in 1966–67.

Henri Lloyd oilskins were worn by Sir Robin Knox-Johnston when he became the first man to perform a single-handed non-stop circumnavigation of the globe in 1969.

Sir Ranulph Fiennes and his crew wore Henri Lloyd foul weather gear on their Transglobe Expedition.

Chay Blyth and Naomi Jones both wore Henri Lloyd sailing clothing for their circumnavigations.

=== Corporate partnership ===
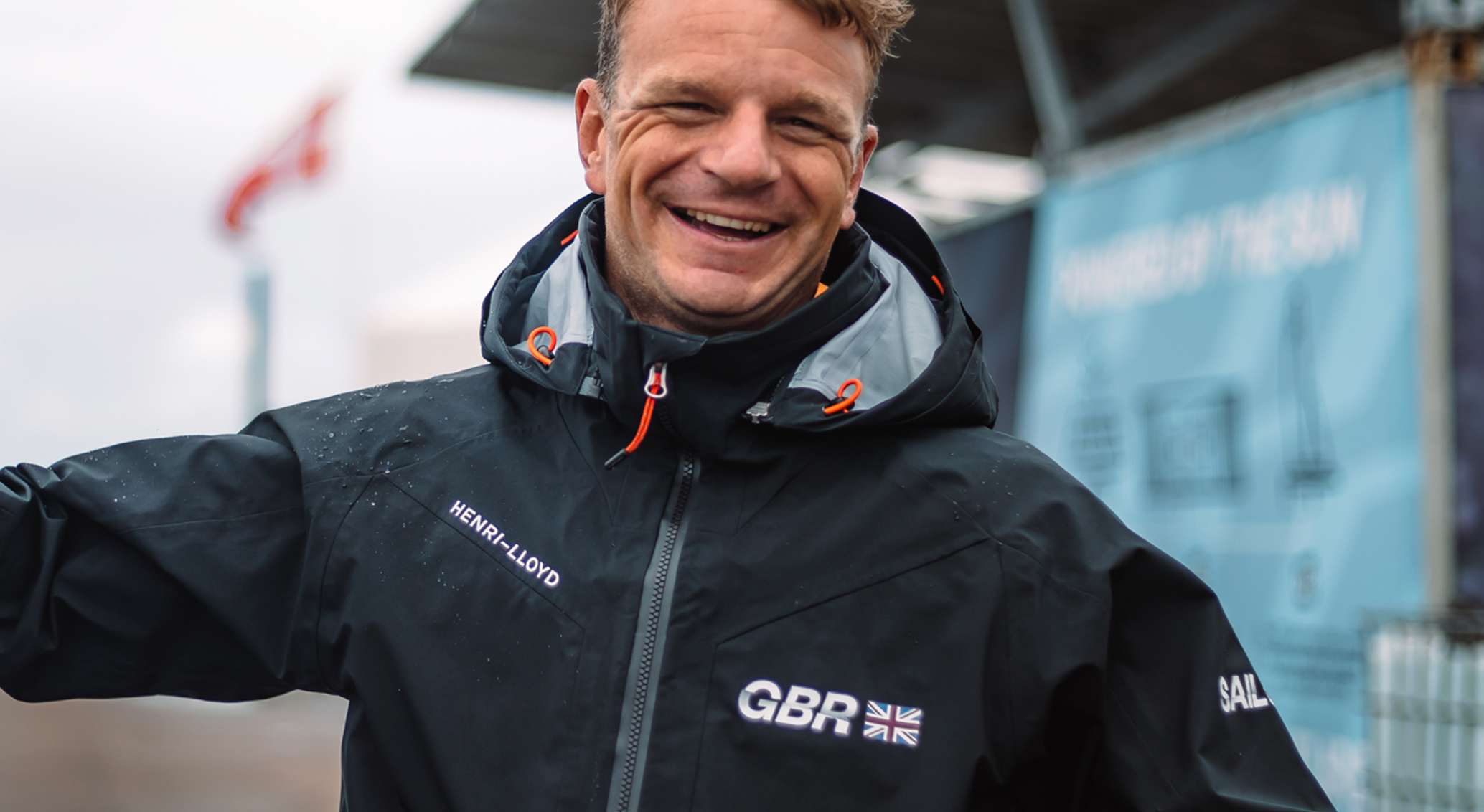
A photograph of Nick Hutton, the Trimmer/Grinder for the Emirates Team GBR.

In 2009, Henri Lloyd became the "Official Supplier of Clothing and Footwear Technology" of the Brawn GP Formula One Team as part of a commercial partnership.

Henri Lloyd have sponsored Sir Ben Ainslie since 1996 and were his first commercial sponsor. It has also supported Shirley Robertson. It has been the technical clothing supplier for the Clipper Round the World Yacht Race since 2002 and for Land Rover BAR’s 2017 America’s Cup bid. The sailing kit was developed in close collaboration with the Land Rover BAR team and featured a neoprene wetsuit long john and top.

In 2017 the brand announced a three-year sponsorship deal with the FAST40+ Class, providing bespoke sailing kit for the crew and a perpetual trophy for the FAST40+ Race Circuit.

Henri Lloyd were one of the sponsors of Cowes Classics Week 2017, which includes a Henri Lloyd race day and trophy.

In September 2018 Henri Lloyd continued its partnership with Sir Ben by announcing a partnership with Ineos Team UK in the pursuit of the 36th challenge of the America's Cup in 2021.

Henri Lloyd is the current official Performance Clothing Partner of the Americas Cup team, Ineos Britannia. The brand also actively has a purpose led partnership with the Emirates Great Britain SailGP Team.

=== Fashion ===
Henri Lloyd first became known for fashion in 1984 when the Milan Scooter Society or ‘Paninaro' scene adopted the Henri Lloyd Consort Jacket as part of their uniform along with Levi 501 jeans and Timberland boots. Additionally, the brand was profoundly popular within the Madchester scene.

The mid-1990s saw the launch of Henri Lloyd Black Label, This Massimo Goggi designed collection linked Italian-inspired sportswear with technically innovative fabrics, helping the firm earn the Fashion Brand of the Year in the UK award in 1997.

The Consort Jacket, first designed by Henri Strzelecki in 1965 has been redesigned for 2017 in a collection of 21 different editions.

In 2023 the brand announced the appointment of Scottish Menswear Designer Kestin Hare as Creative Director.

=== Change of Ownership ===
Facing severe financial difficulties in early 2018 Henri Lloyd reduced costs and divested assets. In March 2018 they sold the Henri Lloyd brand and trademarks to Aligro Group, a Swedish investment firm.

On 8 June 2018 it was announced that the company had been put into administration. Three days later it was announced that the company was purchased by Aligro Group. Altogether, 128 jobs were lost, the company's Manchester office closed, and the brand moved to Sweden.

In September 2018, the firm announced a relaunch of all lines in 2019 with "25 styles for men and women. The products are adapted for one-design sailing, keelboats and super yachts, with a focus on Northern European and Mediterranean sailors."

In 2022, the brand was acquired by Monte Rosa Capital.
