= Christopher Lloyd (priest) =

Irish Anglican priest (1678–1757)

Christopher Lloyd (1678–1757) was an Irish Anglican priest in the mid-18th-century.

LLoyd was born in County Kilkenny and educated at Trinity College, Dublin. He was Dean of Elphin from 1739 until his death.

He is buried at St. Bride's Church, Dublin.
