= Henri Strzelecki =

Polish born British fashion designer (1925–2012)

Henryk Strzelecki MBE (4 October 1925 – 26 December 2012), known as Henri Strzelecki, was a Polish fashion designer who lived a substantial part of his life in the United Kingdom. Strzelecki and Angus Lloyd co-founded the British clothing label, Henri Lloyd, in Manchester, United Kingdom, in 1963. He was known as Henri or Mr Henri to colleagues and friends.

== Early life ==
Strzelecki was born in Brodnica, Poland. He fled Poland with the outbreak of World War II and enlisted in the Polish 2nd Corps (later part of the British Eighth Army) in Italy. Strzelecki fought with the Corps in battles throughout the war, notably participating in the liberation of the city of Bologna from the Germans. He was awarded medals from both the British and Polish militaries for his service during the war. Strzelecki decided to remain in the United Kingdom following the war due to the Communist takeover of Poland. He began studying textiles and fibers, which would lead to a career in the clothing industry.

== Career ==
Strzelecki and Lloyd launched Henri-Lloyd Limited, an amalgamation of their two names, in 1963. Their company, which specializes in outdoor gear, golf clothing, yachting and outdoor lifestyle apparel, quickly earned a reputation for introducing new technologies and man-made textiles and fiber into their clothing. Under Strzelecki and Lloyd, Henri Lloyd became one of the first to utilize Velcro, Gore-Tex, and Bri-Nylon in their apparel. Henri Lloyd clothing became the choice of prominent sailors, Olympians, and explorers, including Sir Ranulph Fiennes, Shirley Robertson, and Sir Robin Knox-Johnston.

Henri Strzelecki died on 26 December 2012, at the age of 87. He was survived by his two sons, Paul and Martin, both of whom are joint chief executives of Henri-Lloyd Limited; and his daughter, Diane. His wife, Sheila, died in 1999.

== Awards ==
Queen Elizabeth II awarded Strzelecki the Member of the Order of the British Empire for his contributions to the clothing industry in 1985. The Henri Lloyd company further received the Queen's Award for Export Achievement in 1986 and 1987. In 1987, Strzelecki was named the Marine Personality of the Year by the Marine Trades Association. The President of Poland also awarded him the Gold Cross of Merit in 1990.

== See also ==
- Strzelecki (disambiguation)
- Izabela Trojanowska
