= Angus Lloyd (businessman) =

British fashion designer

- Occupations: Businessman; fashion designer; fine art dealer
- Known for: Founding the Henri Lloyd clothing line in Manchester with Henri Strzelecki and establishing Burlington Gallery

Angus Lloyd was a British businessman and fashion designer. In 1963, Lloyd and his business partner, Henri Strzelecki, founded the Henri Lloyd clothing line in Manchester. Angus was also involved in fine art and established Burlington Paintings.

== Professional life ==
Under Lloyd and Strzelecki, the company became known for its pioneering use of new technologies and man-made materials in its apparel, including Velcro, Bri-Nylon, and Gore-Tex. The clothing was designed for sailors and adventurers.

In 1981, Angus Lloyd and Michael Day set up Burlington Paintings. Prior to this, Angus Lloyd was a partner at a west end gallery. Burlington Paintings was based in Burlington Gardens, London.

== Philanthropy ==
A charity, created in 1964, The Elaine and Angus Lloyd Charitable Trust is named after him and his wife and son James are trustees. The charity provides grants in Kent and Surrey that help to advance health and that support people with disabilities.

== Personal life ==
Angus was married to Wanda Lloyd and had five children Giny, James, Christopher, Pippa and Richard. On 14 June 2025, Angus died aged 89 years old.
