= Paweł Finder =

Polish politician (1904–1944)

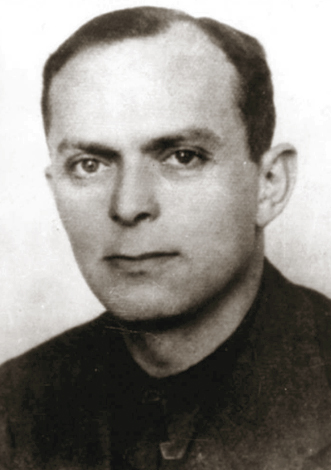
- Born: Pinkus Finder; 19 September 1904; Nussdorf, Biala District, Kingdom of Galicia and Lodomeria, Austria-Hungary
- Died: 26 July 1944 (aged 39); Warsaw Ghetto, General Government
- Cause of death: Executed
- Other names: Paul Finder; Paul Reynot
- Education: ENSCMu
- Occupation: Chemical engineer
- Employer: CNAM
- Title: First Secretary
- Term: 1943
- Predecessor: Bolesław Mołojec
- Successor: Władysław Gomułka
- Political party: PPR
- Other political affiliations: KPÖ; PCF; KPP
- Movement: Communism
- Criminal penalty: Imprisoned in Rawicz (1934-1939) and Pawiak (1943-1944)
- Spouse: Gertruda Finder
- Children: 1
- Military service
- Allegiance: Second Polish Republic
- Branch: Polish Armed Forces
- Service years: 1928–1930
- Rank: Platoon-leader

Paweł Finder (Polish pronunciation: [ˈpavɛw ˈfindɛr]; born as Pinkus Finder; pseudonyms: Paul Finder, Paul Reynot; 19 September 1904 – 26 July 1944) was a Polish Communist leader and First Secretary of the Polish Workers' Party (PPR) from 1943 to 1944.

== Early life ==
Finder came from an affluent Jewish shopkeeping family in Nussdorf, (Note: Today the Leszczyny area of Lipnik, Bielsko-Biała.) where he was educated. He briefly flirted with Zionism while still at school and visited Palestine. He studied Chemistry in Vienna, Mulhouse and Paris. As a chemical engineer, he was a researcher at the Conservatoire national des arts et métiers and was an assistant to Frédéric Joliot-Curie.

== Communist Party activist ==
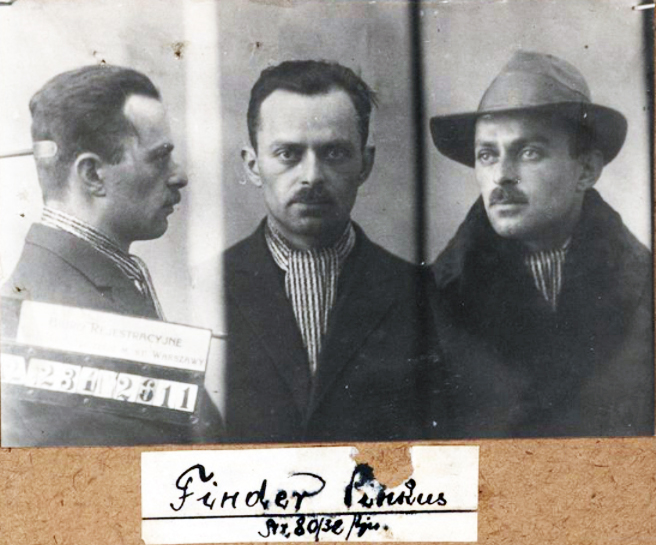
A PP mug shot of Finder after his arrest in 1934. Taken from the Archives of Modern Records

From 1922 to 1924, he was a member of the Austrian Communist Party, and from 1924 to 1928 of the French Communist Party, serving in the Central Committee apparatus and writing articles for l'Humanité. He was expelled from France for Communist activity in 1928 and returned to Poland. He completed military service in an officer school. He was active in the underground Communist Party of Poland (KPP) until his arrest in 1934, serving as a secretary in Silesia, Łódź, Warsaw and Kraków, and as a member of the National Secretariat in 1933.

He was arrested in 1934 and sentenced to 12 years' imprisonment. During the German and Soviet invasions of Poland in September 1939, he was able to flee Rawicz prison and went to the Soviet Union. He worked in the planning commission of the local authority established in Soviet-occupied Belostok, becoming its chairman early in 1941. Finder fled to Moscow when the Germans invaded and was directed to the Comintern training school as a leader of the "initiative group" formed to re-establish the Communist movement in Poland. On 27 December 1941, he was parachuted into the General Government. Within the troika that formed and led the PPR (with Marceli Nowotko and Bolesław Mołojec), he provided intellectual and ideological support for Nowotko. He succeeded him as secretary in January 1943, following the murder of Nowotko and the subsequent execution of Mołojec.

== Arrest and death ==
Finder was arrested by the Gestapo on 14 December 1943 and imprisoned in Pawiak. He was identified, tortured and shot by the Nazis in the ruins of the Warsaw Ghetto as they evacuated and demolished Pawiak in July 1944.

His first wife, by whom he had a daughter, died in France in the 1920s. His second wife, Gertruda Finder, was a KPP activist and worked in the Polish security apparatus after the war.
