= The Voice Senior (Polish TV series) season 1 =

Artist talent hunt show

The Voice Senior
- Season 1
- Hosted by: Tomasz Kammel; Marta Manowska; Janina Busk
- Judges: Marek Piekarczyk; Urszula Dudziak; Alicja Majewska; Andrzej Piaseczny
- Winners: Jola, Krystyna, & Ela Szydłowskie

Release
- Original network: TVP2
- Original release: December 7 – December 28, 2019

Season chronology
- Next → Season 2

The Voice Senior (season 1) began airing on 7 December 2019 on TVP 2. It aired on Saturdays at 20:05 and 21:10. Based on the original The Voice Senior, it has aired one season and aims to find currently unsigned singing talent (solo or duets, professional and amateur) contested by aspiring singers, age 60 or over, drawn from public auditions. The winner will be determined by television viewers voting by telephone, SMS.

The series employs a panel of four coaches who critique the artists' performances and guide their teams of selected artists through the remainder of the season. They also compete to ensure that their act wins the competition, thus making them the winning coach. The original panel featured Marek Piekarczyk, Urszula Dudziak, Alicja Majewska and Andrzej Piaseczny.

== Coaches ==
The judges were Andrzej Piaseczny, Alicja Majewska, Urszula Dudziak and Marek Piekarczyk.

Coaches gallery

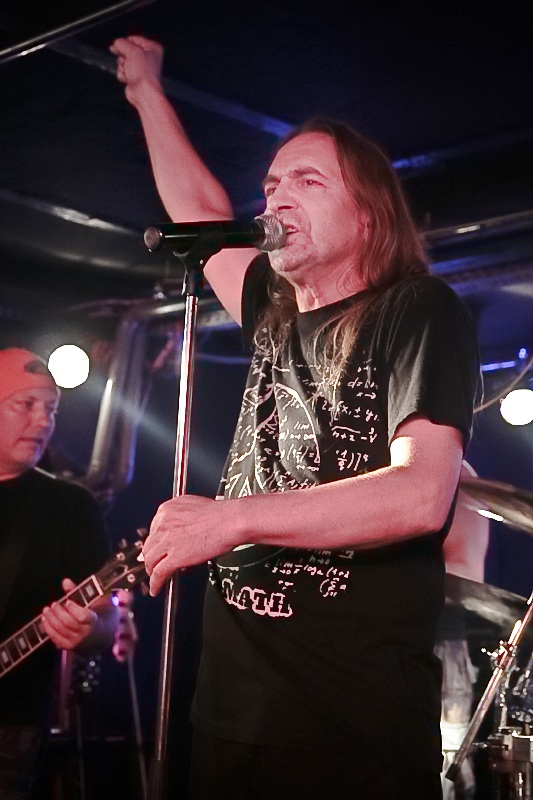
Marek Piekarczyk

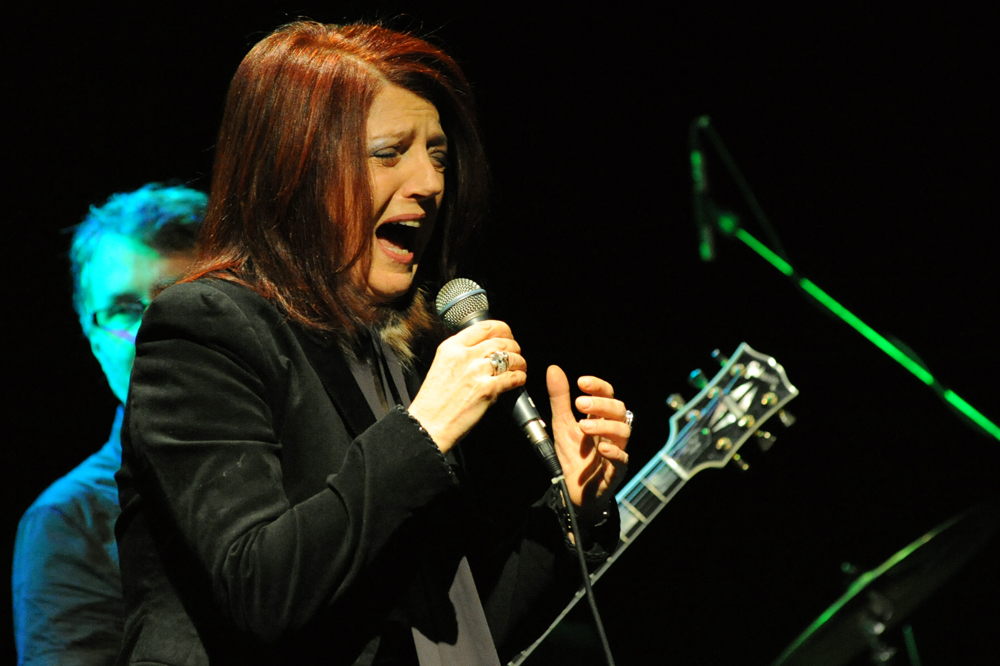
Urszula Dudziak

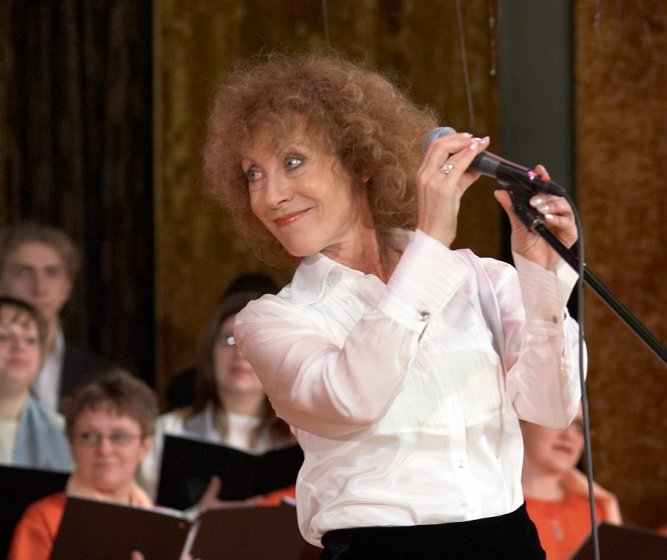
Alicja Majewska

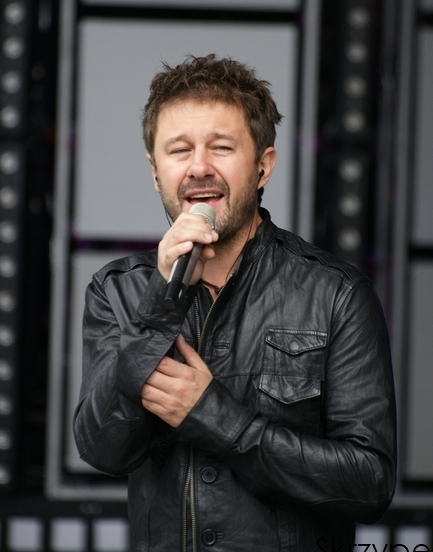
Andrzej Piaseczny

== Presenters ==
Tomasz Kammel and Marta Manowska hosted the show with Janina Busk as V-Reporter.

== Teams ==
Color key

- Winner
- Runner-up
- Eliminated in the Final
- Eliminated in the Semifinal

Coaches	Top 16 artists			
Andrzej Piaseczny				
Andrzej Piaseczny	Bogumiła Kucharczyk-Włodarek	Mieczysław Pernach	Mieczysław Kincel	Anna Federczyk
Alicja Majewska				
Alicja Majewska	Janusz Sztyber	Jadwiga Kocik	Eugeniusz Tiemnikow	Janusz Sobolewski
Urszula Dudziak				
Urszula Dudziak	Jola, Krystyna, & Ela Szydłowskie	Waldemar Wiśniewski	Andrzej Zagdański	James Brierley
Marek Piekarczyk				
Marek Piekarczyk	Władysław Jarecki	Kazimierz Kilian	Hanna Michalik	Mieczysław Gajos

== Blind auditions ==
Color keys

✔	Coach hit his/her "I WANT YOU" button
	Artist defaulted to this coach's team
	Artist elected to join this coach's team
	Artist eliminated with no coach pressing his or her "I WANT YOU" button
	Artist received an 'All Turn'.

=== Episode 1 (December 7, 2019) ===
Order	Artist	Age	Song	Coach's and contestant's choices			
Order	Artist	Age	Song	Andrzej	Alicja	Urszula	Marek
1	Jadwiga Kocik	60	Miłość w Portofino	✔	✔	✔	✔
2	Kazimierz Kilijan	72	Gdzie się podziały tamte prywatki	—	—	—	✔
3	Mieczysław Gajos	62	Les Champs Élysées	✔	—	—	✔
4	Anna Winiarz	71	Serduszko puka w rytmie cha-cha	—	—	—	—
5	Janusz Sztyber	67	Always on My Mind	✔	✔	—	✔

=== Episode 2 (December 7, 2019) ===
Order	Artist	Age	Song	Coach's and contestant's choices			
Order	Artist	Age	Song	Andrzej	Alicja	Urszula	Marek
1	Mieczysław Pernach	63	Lubię wracać tam, gdzie byłem	✔	✔	✔	✔
2	Andrzej Zagdański	65	Żółte kalendarze	—	—	✔	—
3	Kazimierz Matecki	72	Cała sala śpiewa z nami	—	—	—	—
4	James Brierely	75	Wonderful Tonight	✔	✔	✔	✔
5	Bogumiła Kucharczyk-Włodarek	68	Nie chcę więcej	✔	—	—	✔

=== Episode 3 (December 14, 2019) ===
Order	Artist	Age	Song	Coach's and contestant's choices			
Order	Artist	Age	Song	Andrzej	Alicja	Urszula	Marek
1	Jola, Krystyna, & Ela Szydłowskie	62 (Jola), 66 (Krystyna), 65 (Ela)	Kwiat jednej nocy	—	✔	✔	—
2	Mieczysław Kincel	67	Mamma son tanto Felice	✔	—	—	—
3	Hanna Michalik	77	Embarras	—	—	—	✔
4	Tadeusz Urbański	66	Rysunek na szkle	—	—	—	—
5	Eugeniusz Tiemnikow	70	Nim wstanie dzień	—	✔	—	✔

=== Episode 4 (December 14, 2019) ===
Order	Artist	Age	Song	Coach's and contestant's choices			
Order	Artist	Age	Song	Andrzej	Alicja	Urszula	Marek
1	Waldemar Wiśniewski	63	Sexbomb	✔	✔	✔	✔
2	Anna Federczyk	60	Radość najpiękniejszych lat	✔	✔	✔	✔
3	Janusz Sobolewski	67	Tango Milonga	✔	✔	—	—
4	Zdzisław Dusza	70	Czarny Ali Baba	—	—	—	—
5	Władysław Jarecki	73	Don't Close Your Eyes	✔	—	—	✔

== Sing Off (Merry Christmas) ==
Sing Off round aired on December 21, 2019.

The top 8 contestants then moved on to the "Live Season Final."

Colour key

Artist was saved by his/her coach and advanced to the Final
Artist was eliminated

Episode	Coach	Order	Artist	Song	Result
Episode 5 (December 21, 2019)	Marek Piekarczyk	1	Kazimierz Kiljan	Dzień jeden w roku	Advanced
Episode 5 (December 21, 2019)	Marek Piekarczyk	2	Mieczysław Gajos	Douce nuit, sainte nuit	Eliminated
Episode 5 (December 21, 2019)	Marek Piekarczyk	3	Hanna Michalik	Nie było miejsca dla ciebie	Eliminated
Episode 5 (December 21, 2019)	Marek Piekarczyk	4	Władysław Jarecki	Blue Christmas	Advanced
Episode 5 (December 21, 2019)	Alicja Majewska	5	Eugeniusz Tiemnikow	Lulajże Jezuniu	Eliminated
Episode 5 (December 21, 2019)	Alicja Majewska	6	Janusz Sobolewski	Jingle bells	Eliminated
Episode 5 (December 21, 2019)	Alicja Majewska	7	Jadwiga Kocik	Nie ma, nie ma ciebie	Advanced
Episode 5 (December 21, 2019)	Alicja Majewska	8	Janusz Sztyber	White Christmas	Advanced
Episode 5 (December 21, 2019)	Andrzej Piaseczny	9	Mieczysław Pernach	Święty czas	Advanced
Episode 5 (December 21, 2019)	Andrzej Piaseczny	10	Bogumiła Kucharczyk-Włodarek	Na całej połaci śnieg	Advanced
Episode 5 (December 21, 2019)	Andrzej Piaseczny	11	Anna Federczyk	Gdy Śliczna Panna	Eliminated
Episode 5 (December 21, 2019)	Andrzej Piaseczny	12	Mieczysław Kincel	Pada śnieg	Eliminated
Episode 5 (December 21, 2019)	Urszula Dudziak	13	Andrzej Zagdański	Feliz Navidad	Eliminated
Episode 5 (December 21, 2019)	Urszula Dudziak	14	Jola, Krystyna, & Ela Szydłowskie	Winter Wonderland	Advanced
Episode 5 (December 21, 2019)	Urszula Dudziak	15	Waldemar Wiśniewski	Driving home for Christmas	Advanced
Episode 5 (December 21, 2019)	Urszula Dudziak	16	James Brierley	Happy Xmas	Eliminated

Non-competition performances
Order	Performers	Song
1	Special performance of "The Voice Kids" Coaches	"All I want for Christmas is you"

== Final ==
Colour key:

Advance to the second round
Eliminated in the first round
The Voice Senior Poland 2019
Finalist

Episode 6 (1st part) (December 28, 2019)
Order	Coaches	Artist	Song	Result
1	Andrzej Piaseczny	Mieczysław Pernach	"Up where we belong" - Joe Cocker & Jeniffer Warnes	Eliminated
2	Andrzej Piaseczny	Bogumiła Kucharczyk-Włodarek	"Jest cudnie" - Maryla Rodowicz	Advanced
3	Alicja Majewska	Jadwiga Kocik	"Być kobietą po 40-tce" - Elżbieta Jodłowska	Eliminated
4	Alicja Majewska	Janusz Sztyber	"Over the Rainbow" - Judy Garland	Advanced
5	Marek Piekarczyk	Władysław Jarecki	"I don't want to talk about it" - Danny Whitten	Advanced
6	Marek Piekarczyk	Kazimierz Kiljan	"Raindrops keep fallin' on my head" - B.J. Thomas	Eliminated
7	Urszula Dudziak	Waldemar Wiśniewski	"Just A Gigolo" - Louis Prima	Eliminated
8	Urszula Dudziak	Jola, Krystyna, & Ela Szydłowskie	"Sing, Sing, Sing (with a swing)" - The Andrews Sisters	Advanced

Episode 6 (2nd part) (December 28, 2019)
Order	Coaches	Artist	1st Song	2nd Song	Result
1	Andrzej Piaseczny	Bogumiła Kucharczyk-Włodarek	"Nie chcę więcej" - Michał Bajor	"Jaka róża, taki cierń" - Edyta Geppert	Runner-up
2	Alicja Majewska	Janusz Sztyber	"Always on My Mind" - Elvis Presley	"Sway" - Dean Martin	Runner-up
3	Marek Piekarczyk	Władysław Jarecki	"Don't Close Your Eyes" - Keith Whitley	"Have you ever seen the rain?" - Rod Stewart	Runner-up
4	Urszula Dudziak	Jola, Krystyna, & Ela Szydłowskie	"Kwiat jednej nocy" - Alibabki	"The Shoop Shoop Song (It's in His Kiss)" - Betty Everett	Winner
