= The Voice Senior (Polish TV series) season 2 =

The Voice Senior
- Season 2
- Hosted by: Rafał Brzozowski; Marta Manowska
- Judges: Alicja Majewska; Andrzej Piaseczny; Izabela Trojanowska; Witold Paszt
- Winner: Barbara Parzeczewska

Release
- Original network: TVP2
- Original release: 2 January – 28 February 2021

Season chronology
- ← Previous; Season 1

The Voice Senior (season 2) began airing on 2 January 2021 on TVP 2. It airs on Saturdays at 20:00 and at 21:10.

Andrzej Piaseczny and Alicja Majewska returned as coaches for the second season of the show alongside newcomers Izabela Trojanowska and Witold Paszt, replaced Marek Piekarczyk and Urszula Dudziak. Rafał Brzozowski, who replaced Tomasz Kammel, hosted the show with Marta Manowska.

== Presenters ==
Rafał Brzozowski, who replaced Tomasz Kammel, hosted the show with Marta Manowska.

== Coaches ==
On August 17, 2020, it was announced that Alicja Majewska and Andrzej Piaseczny returned as the coaches in the second season of the show, meanwhile new coaches Izabela Trojanowska and Witold Paszt replaced Marek Piekarczyk and Urszula Dudziak in a new season.

Coaches gallery

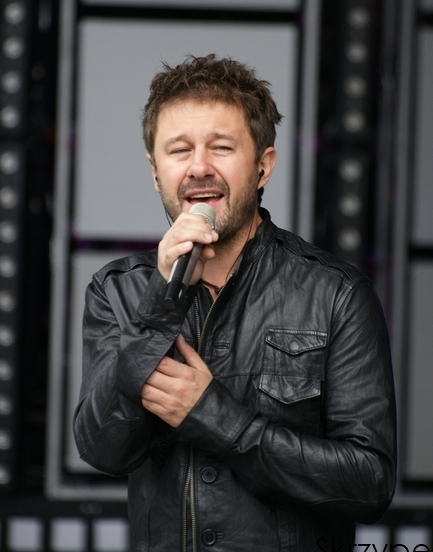
Andrzej Piaseczny

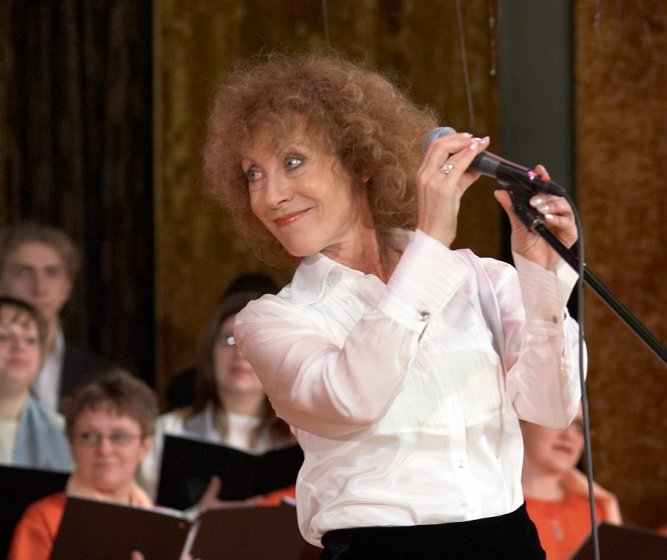
Alicja Majewska

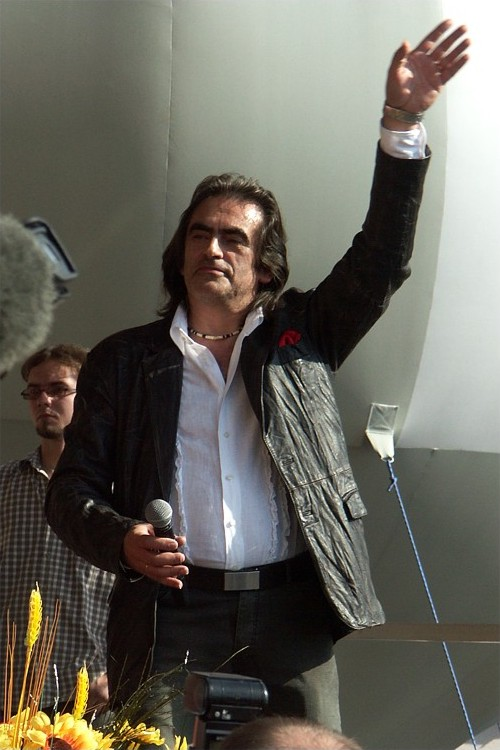
Witold Paszt

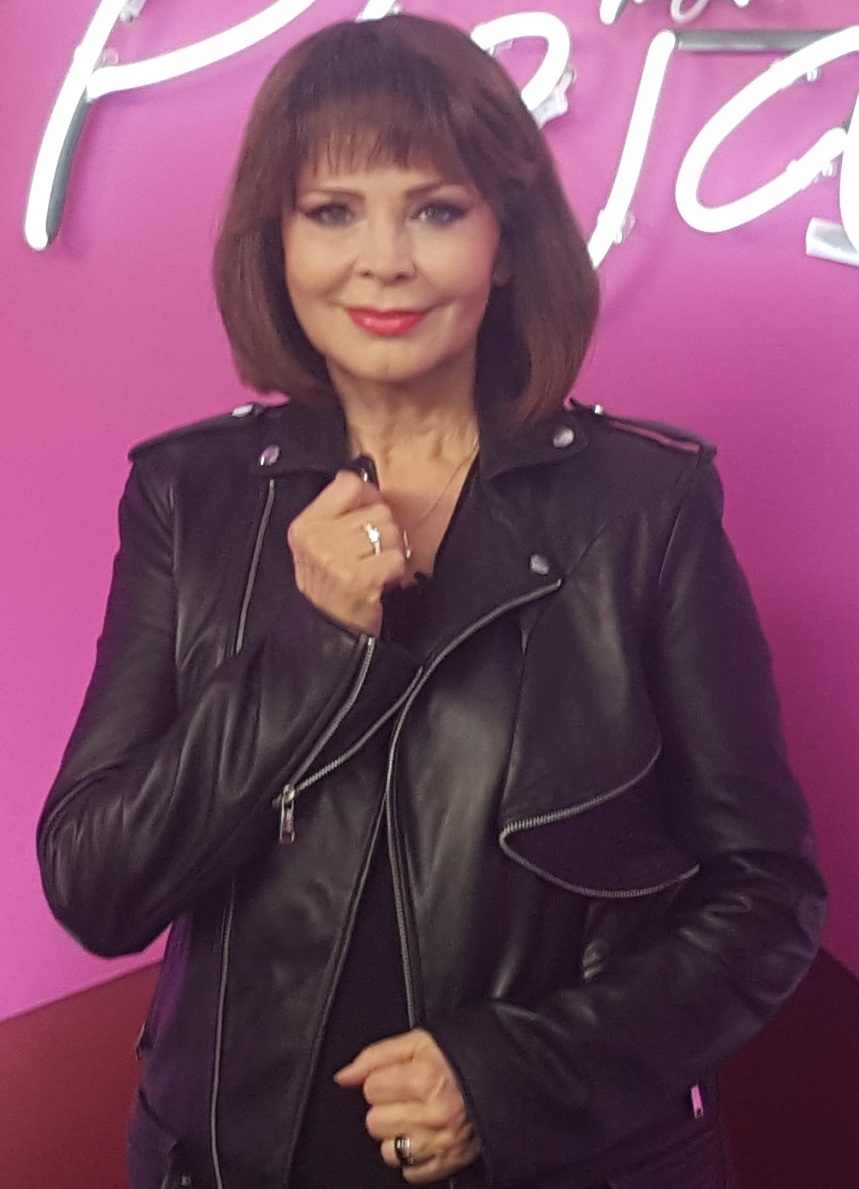
Izabela Trojanowska

== Teams ==
Color key

- Winner
- Runner-up
- Eliminated in the Final
- Eliminated in the Semifinal

Coaches	Top 24 artists					
Andrzej Piaseczny						
Andrzej Piaseczny	Barbara Parzeczewska	Anna Tchórzewska	Andrzej Sobolewski	Romuald Ardanowski	Ireneusz Nosek	Andrzej Musiałek
Alicja Majewska						
Alicja Majewska	Raisa Misztela	Kazimierz Górecki	Irena Hodowaniec	Elżbieta Jatulewicz	Cezary Olszewski	Jolanta Zając-Stachurska
Witold Paszt						
Witold Paszt	Andrzej Pawłowski	Ewa Olszewska	Alicja Mieszało	Jan Adamiak	Jadwiga Paduch	Teresa Mikuta
Izabela Trojanowska						
Izabela Trojanowska	Andrzej Nosowski	Andrzej Szpak	Waldemar Bara	Tomasz Szymański	Wiesław Herliczko	Teresa Kuczera

== Blind auditions ==
Color keys

✔	Coach hit his/her "I WANT YOU" button
	Artist defaulted to this coach's team
	Artist elected to join this coach's team
	Artist eliminated with no coach pressing his or her "I WANT YOU" button
	Artist received an 'All Turn'.

=== Episode 1 (January 2, 2021) ===
Order	Artist	Age	Song	Coach's and contestant's choices			
Order	Artist	Age	Song	Andrzej	Alicja	Witold	Izabela
1	Waldemar Bara	62	"Czerwony Jak Cegła" - Dżem	✔	–	✔	✔
2	Edwarda Anna Tchórzewska	72	"Dziś prawdziwych cyganów już nie ma" - Maryla Rodowicz and Stan Borys	✔	✔	✔	✔
3	Alicja Mieszało	78	"Pamięć"	–	–	✔	✔
4	Andrzej Sobolewski	64	"Wznieś serce nad zło" - Ryszard Rynkowski	✔	✔	✔	✔

=== Episode 2 (January 2, 2021) ===
Order	Artist	Age	Song	Coach's and contestant's choices			
Order	Artist	Age	Song	Andrzej	Alicja	Witold	Izabela
1	Irena Hodowaniec	61	"Do kołyski" - Dżem	–	✔	–	✔
2	Mirosław Czerniak	72	"Szczęście jest we mnie" - Zbigniew Wodecki	–	–	–	–
3	Iwona Rajchel	63	"Jambalaya" - Anna Jantar	–	–	–	–
4	Andrzej Nosowski	67	"Spragniony" - Kamil Bednarek	–	✔	✔	✔
5	Jan Adamiak	67	"Jaskółka uwięziona" - Stan Borys	✔	✔	✔	–

=== Episode 3 (January 9, 2021) ===
Order	Artist	Age	Song	Coach's and contestant's choices			
Order	Artist	Age	Song	Andrzej	Alicja	Witold	Izabela
1	Tomasz Szymański	60	"You Are so beautiful" - Joe Cocker	✔	✔	✔	✔
2	Wojciech Walczak	76	"Apasjonata" - Janusz Gniatkowski	–	–	–	–
3	Elżbieta Jatulewicz	70	"Tango na głos, orkiestrę i jeszcze jeden głos" - Maryla Rodowicz	✔	✔	✔	–
4	Krzysztof Podhorodecki	60	"Good Golly, Miss Molly" - Little Richard	–	–	–	–
5	Barbara Parzeczewska	67	"Valerie" - Amy Winehouse	✔	✔	✔	–

=== Episode 4 (January 9, 2021) ===
Order	Artist	Age	Song	Coach's and contestant's choices			
Order	Artist	Age	Song	Andrzej	Alicja	Witold	Izabela
1	Romuald Ardanowski	72	"Nie widzę Ciebie w swych marzeniach" - Skaldowie	✔	✔	✔	✔
2	Jadwiga Paduch	68	"I left my heart in San Francisco" - Tony Bennett	–	–	✔	–
3	Cezary Olszewski	70	"Green gren grass of home" - Tom Jones	✔	✔	✔	–
4	Barbara Kalinowska	67	"Serca gwiazd" - Halina Frąckowiak	–	–	–	–
5	Danuta Krasnodębska	94	"Jesienna piosenka" - Hanka Ordonówna	–	–	–	–

=== Episode 5 (January 16, 2021) ===
Order	Artist	Age	Song	Coach's and contestant's choices			
Order	Artist	Age	Song	Andrzej	Alicja	Witold	Izabela
1	Ewa Olszewska	65	"Cykady na Cykladach" - Manaam	✔	–	✔	✔
2	Czesława Szymaniak	82	"Ej, przeleciał ptaszek" - Mazowsze (folk group)	–	–	–	–
3	Ireneusz Nosek	67	"Smoke on the water" - Deep Purple	✔	–	✔	–
4	Małgorzata Sitek	70	"Rudy rydz" - Helena Majdaniec	–	–	–	–
5	Andrzej Pawłowski	60	"Nie płacz, kiedy odjadę" - Marino Marini	–	–	✔	–

=== Episode 6 (January 16, 2021) ===
Order	Artist	Age	Song	Coach's and contestant's choices			
Order	Artist	Age	Song	Andrzej	Alicja	Witold	Izabela
1	Julian Musielski	73	"Speedy Gonzales" - Pat Boone	–	–	–	–
2	Adam Wolak	74	"Gdy nam śpiewał Elvis Presley" - Krzysztof Krawczyk	–	–	–	–
3	Wiesław Herliczko	65	"Małe tęsknoty" - Krystyna Prońko	–	–	–	✔
4	Janina Potudin	68	"To były piękne dni" - Halina Kunicka	–	–	–	–
5	Kazimierz Górecki	73	"New York, New York" - Frank Sinatra	✔	✔	✔	✔

=== Episode 7 (January 23, 2021) ===
Order	Artist	Age	Song	Coach's and contestant's choices			
Order	Artist	Age	Song	Andrzej	Alicja	Witold	Izabela
1	Jolanta Zając-Stachurska	64	"Ona i on (love story)" - Zdzisława Sośnicka	✔	✔	✔	✔
2	Andrzej Szpak	72	"Oh, pritty woman" - Roy Orbison and the Candy Men	–	–	✔	✔
3	Bożena Ostrowska	65	"Singin’ in the rain" - Gene Kelly	–	–	–	–
4	Teresa Mikuta	65	"Do Ciebie, mamo (list do matki)" - Violetta Villas	–	–	✔	–
5	Jerzy Zwierzyński	72	"Umówiłem się z nią na dziewiątą" - Eugeniusz Bodo	–	–	–	–

=== Episode 8 (January 23, 2021) ===
Order	Artist	Age	Song	Coach's and contestant's choices			
Order	Artist	Age	Song	Andrzej	Alicja	Witold	Izabela
1	Ryszard Spyt	72	"Wakacje z blondynką" - Maciej Kossowski	–	–	–	–
2	Teresa Kuczera	72	"O mnie się nie martw" - Katarzyna Sobczyk	–	–	–	✔
3	Andrzej Musiałek	64	"Życia mała garść" - Krzysztof Krawczyk	✔	–	–	–
4	Zbigniew Żelazko	62	"Chałupy welcome to" - Zbigniew Wodecki	–	–	–	–
5	Raisa Misztela	60	"Niech żyje bal" - Maryla Rodowicz	✔	✔	✔	✔

== Semi-final ==
Semi-final round aired on January 30, 2021.

The top 8 contestants then moved on to the final.

Colour key

Artist was saved by his/her coach and advanced to the Final
Artist was eliminated

=== 1st part ===
Episode	Coach	Order	Artist	Song	Result
Episode 9 (January 30, 2021)
Episode 9 (January 30, 2021)	Andrzej Piaseczny	1	Romuald Ardanowski	"Sen o Victorii" - Dżem	Eliminated
Episode 9 (January 30, 2021)	Andrzej Piaseczny	2	Anna Tchórzewska	"Pamiętasz była jesień" - Sława Przybylska	Advanced
Episode 9 (January 30, 2021)	Andrzej Piaseczny	3	Andrzej Musiałek	"Obudź się" - Oddział Zamknięty	Eliminated
Episode 9 (January 30, 2021)	Alicja Majewska	4	Irena Hodowaniec	"Ty" - Michał Bajor	Eliminated
Episode 9 (January 30, 2021)	Alicja Majewska	5	Kazimierz Górecki	"Hello" - Lionel Richie	Advanced
Episode 9 (January 30, 2021)	Alicja Majewska	6	Elżbieta Jatulewicz	"S.O.S." - Kalina Jędrusik	Eliminated
Episode 9 (January 30, 2021)	Izabela Trojanowska	7	Andrzej Szpak	"Jednego serca" - Czesław Niemen	Advanced
Episode 9 (January 30, 2021)	Izabela Trojanowska	8	Teresa Kuczera	"Kasztany" - Natasza Zylska	Eliminated
Episode 9 (January 30, 2021)	Izabela Trojanowska	9	Wiesław Herliczko	"Ludzkie gadanie" - Maryla Rodowicz	Eliminated
Episode 9 (January 30, 2021)	Witold Paszt	10	Teresa Mikuta	"Bésame Mucho" - Consuelo Velázquez	Eliminated
Episode 9 (January 30, 2021)	Witold Paszt	11	Andrzej Pawłowski	"Uciekaj, moje serce" - Seweryn Krajewski	Advanced
Episode 9 (January 30, 2021)	Witold Paszt	12	Alicja Mieszało	"Miłość ci wszystko wybaczy" - Hanka Ordonówna	Eliminated

=== 2nd part ===
Episode	Coach	Order	Artist	Song	Result
Episode 10 (January 09, 2023)
Episode 10 (January 09, 2023)	Andrzej Piaseczny	1	Andrzej Sobolewski	"C'est la vie" - Andrzej Zaucha	Eliminated
Episode 10 (January 09, 2023)	Andrzej Piaseczny	2	Barbara Parzeczewska	"Can't Take My Eyes Off You" - Frankie Valli	Advanced
Episode 10 (January 09, 2023)	Andrzej Piaseczny	3	Ireneusz Nosek	"Nie mogę Ci wiele dać" - Perfect	Eliminated
Episode 10 (January 09, 2023)	Alicja Majewska	4	Jolanta Zając-Stachurska	"Moje serce to jest muzyk" - Ewa Bem	Eliminated
Episode 10 (January 09, 2023)	Alicja Majewska	5	Cezary Olszewski	"A Whiter Shade of Pale" - Procol Harum	Eliminated
Episode 10 (January 09, 2023)	Alicja Majewska	6	Raisa Misztela	"Oczy czarne" - Violetta Villas	Advanced
Episode 10 (January 09, 2023)	Izabela Trojanowska	7	Andrzej Nosowski	"Konie" - Maryla Rodowicz	Advanced
Episode 10 (January 09, 2023)	Izabela Trojanowska	8	Tomasz Szymański	"Bridge Over Troubled Water" - Simon & Garfunkel	Eliminated
Episode 10 (January 09, 2023)	Izabela Trojanowska	9	Waldemar Bara	"Kto nie kochał" Piotr Cugowski	Eliminated
Episode 10 (January 09, 2023)	Witold Paszt	10	Jadwiga Paduch	"Nah Neh Nah" - Vaya Con Dios	Eliminated
Episode 10 (January 09, 2023)	Witold Paszt	11	Jan Adamiak	"Wiem, że nie wrócisz" - Czesław Niemen	Eliminated
Episode 10 (January 09, 2023)	Witold Paszt	12	Ewa Olszewska	"Pogoda ducha" - Hanna Banaszak	Advanced

== Final ==
Colour key:

Advance to the second round
Eliminated in the first round

Episode 11 - Final 1st part (February 6, 2021)
Order	Coaches	Artist	Song	Result
1	Izabela Trojanowska	Andrzej Szpak	"Feeling good" - Nina Simone	Eliminated
2	Izabela Trojanowska	Andrzej Nosowski	"Grande valse brillante" - Ewa Demarczyk	Advanced
3	Witold Paszt	Ewa Olszewska	"Co mi Panie dasz" - Bajm	Eliminated
4	Witold Paszt	Andrzej Pawłowski	"Strangers in the night" - Frank Sinatra	Advanced
5	Alicja Majewska	Kazimierz Górecki	"Delilah" - Tom Jones	Eliminated
6	Alicja Majewska	Raisa Misztela	"Modlitwa" - Bułat Okudżawa	Advanced
7	Andrzej Piaseczny	Anna Tchórzewska	"Proszę sądu" - Maryla Rodowicz	Eliminated
8	Andrzej Piaseczny	Barbara Parzeczewska	"Black velvet" - Alannah Myles	Advanced

Episode 11 - Final 2nd part (February 6, 2021)
Order	Coaches	Artist	1st song	2nd song
1	Izabela Trojanowska	Andrzej Nosowski	"Spragniony" - Kamil Bednarek	"Łatwopalni" - Maryla Rodowicz
2	Witold Paszt	Andrzej Pawłowski	"Nie płacz kiedy odjadę" - Marino Marini	"Żółte kalendarze" - Piotr Szczepanik
3	Alicja Majewska	Raisa Misztela	"Oczy czarne" - Violetta Villas	"Powrócisz tu" - Irena Santor
4	Andrzej Piaseczny	Barbara Parzeczewska	"Valerie" - Amy Winehouse	"I will survive" - Gloria Gaynor

== Final - announcement of results ==
Colour key:

Finalist
The Voice Senior Poland 2021

Episode 12 (February 6, 2021)
Order	Coaches	Artist	Result
Announcement of results (Live)
1	Izabela Trojanowska	Andrzej Nosowski	Runner-Up
2	Witold Paszt	Andrzej Pawłowski	Runner-Up
3	Alicja Majewska	Raisa Misztela	Runner-Up
4	Andrzej Piaseczny	Barbara Parzeczewska	Winner
