= Julita and Paula =

Julita and Paula Sokolowskie are a popular violin duo from Poland. They both graduated from the Academy of Music in Warsaw in the violin class. They have played together since early childhood. (Their sister Katarzyna plays oboe, their sister Agnieszka viola and their brother Pawel double bass).

They recorded their first disc, "Julita & Paula", in 1998, on the Sony Music record label. The album consists mostly of compositions of the great classical music masters, like Vivaldi's "Storm", Paganini's "Caprice 9" and Bernstein's "Somewhere". Several famous Polish musicians took part in the recording of the album. The album went gold, and the single promoting it, "Ameryka", was for a long time one of the three songs most frequently played by Polish radio stations.

A year after its premiere, the record was noticed in other countries. With a new look of the cover and with a wider repertoire it appeared in Europe and Asia where it received a lot of good notices. On their next album "Koledowanie Julity & Pauli" (Christmas Songs of Julita & Paula), beside well-known musicians, played also the rest of their siblings. The video clip of one of the Christmas songs form the record has won the 1st prize on the "European Independent Film Festival" and a Yacht on the "Yach Film Festival", a festival of video clips. Discs were promoted during concerts in Poland and abroad – inter alias a concert tour with jazz vocalists Urszula Dudziak and Grazyna Auguscik and polish famous musician Tytus Wojnowicz. The Sisters have given concerts in most of the Polish philharmonic and theatre stages, repeatedly in Warsaw's Congress Hall in the Palace of Culture and Science, in the concert studio of the "Polish Radio and Television" and on the plain-air concerts for multi-thousand audience. They performed in polish embassies for representatives of different countries. They performed in the concert of the world famous tenor Josse Carreras, they played for the heads of state and international VIPs. Thanks to their concerts they gave their support for many charitable organizations. Among multiple prizes they won, there is a very prestigious medal of the Polish Success Academy who grants awards for outstanding achievements. Currently, they are working on their fourth long play record.

== Discography ==
Title	Album details	Peak chart positions	Certifications
Title	Album details	POL	Certifications
Julita & Paula	Released: 1998; Label: Sony Music; Formats: CD	—	POL: Gold
Kolędowanie Julity i Pauli	Released: November 16, 2000; Label: Sony Music; Formats: CD	71	
"—" denotes a recording that did not chart or was not released in that territory.
