= Straconka, Bielsko-Biała =

Straconka
- Osiedle of Bielsko-Biała
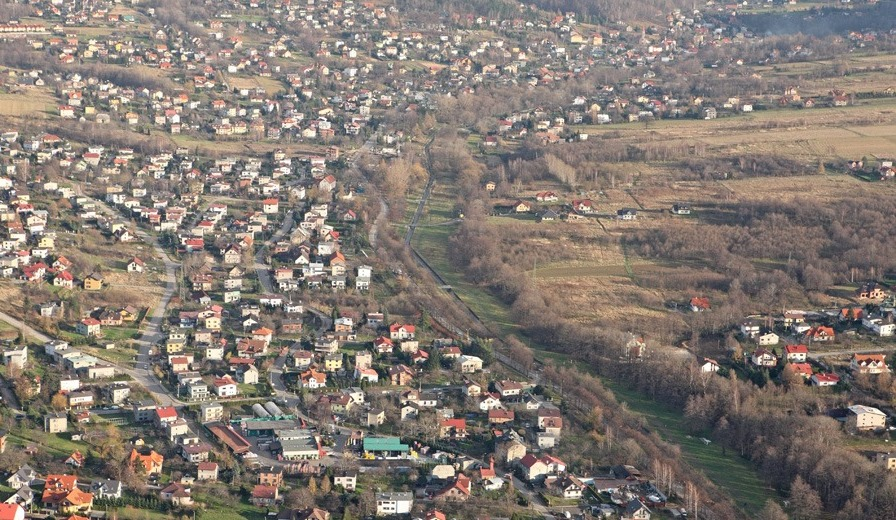
- Aerial view

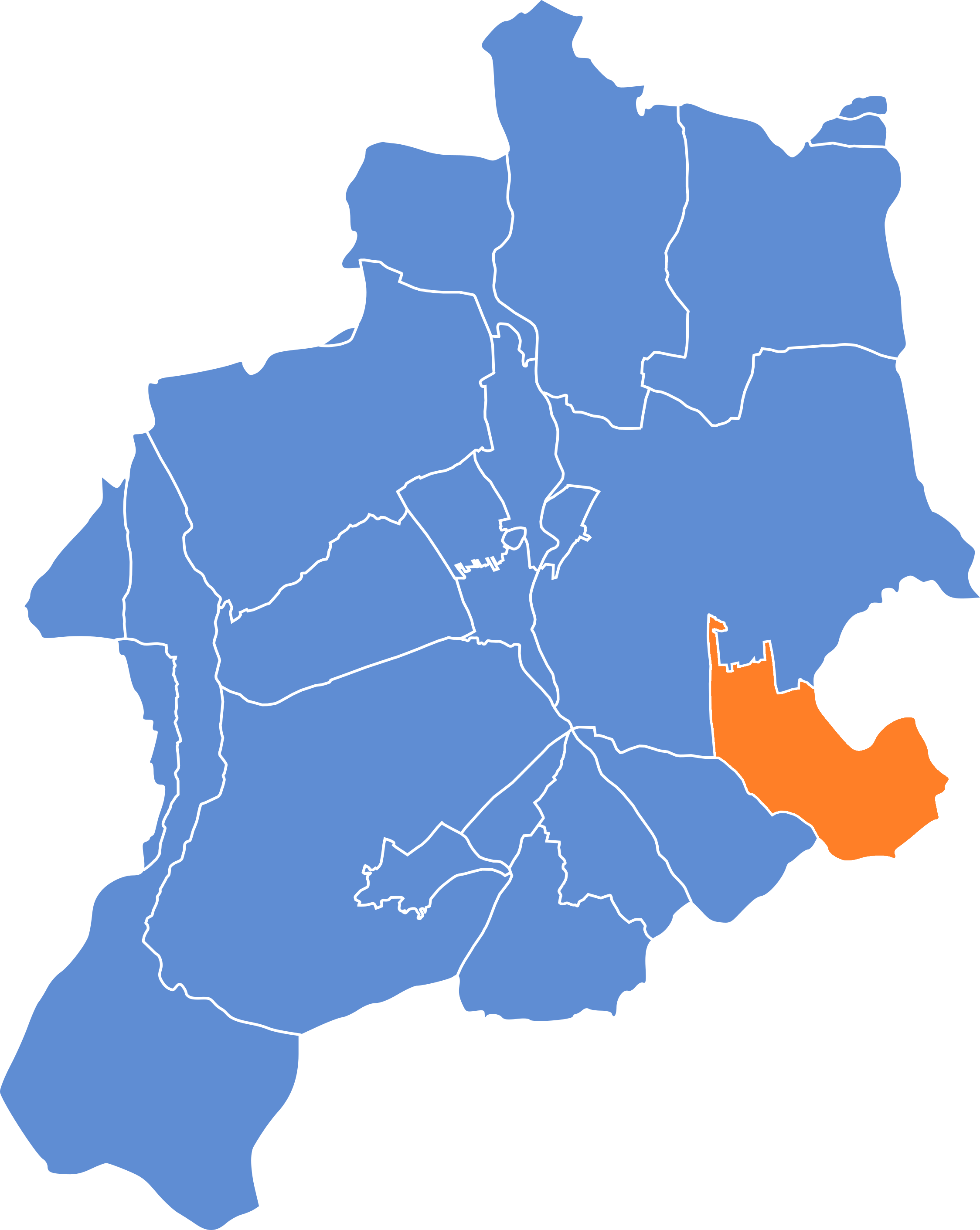
- Location of Straconka within Bielsko-Biała
- Coordinates: 49°47′49″N 19°5′42″E
- Country: Poland
- Voivodeship: Silesian
- County/City: Bielsko-Biała

Area
  - Total: 5.8455 km^{2} (2.2570 sq mi)

Population (2006)
  - Total: 3,149
  - Density: 538.7/km^{2} (1,395/sq mi)
- Time zone: UTC+1 (CET)
  - Summer (DST): UTC+2 (CEST)
- Area code: (+48) 033

Straconka (German: Dresseldorf; Silesian: Strakōnka) is an osiedle (district) of Bielsko-Biała, Silesian Voivodeship, southern Poland. The osiedle has an area of 5.8455 km^{2} and on December 31, 2006, had 3,149 inhabitants.

It is located in the south-east part of the city, in the valley of the Straconka stream, on the western slopes of the Little Beskids.

== History ==
The village was established around 1550 as a hamlet of Lipnik and was first mentioned in 1564. The first inhabitants were Lutherans from Lipnik, named Hoffman and Protzner. In the 18th century the village began to be catholicized by Jesuits.

Upon the First Partition of Poland in 1772, it became part of the Austrian Kingdom of Galicia. In 1854, the village formed a municipality. In 1875, Straconka became a seat of a Catholic parish. In the second half of the 19th century, the village became a resort destination, not only for the nearby Bielsko residents, whereas the local inhabitants most often worked in the textile industry in Bielsko and Biała. In 1900, the municipality had 12,92 km^{2}, 1576 inhabitants, the majority of them being Polish-speaking Catholics.

After World War I and the fall of Austria-Hungary, it became part of Poland. In 1973, most of the area of the Straconka was absorbed by the town of Bielsko-Biała.

== Born in Straconka ==
- Urszula Dudziak
