= Mika Urbaniak =

American pop singer

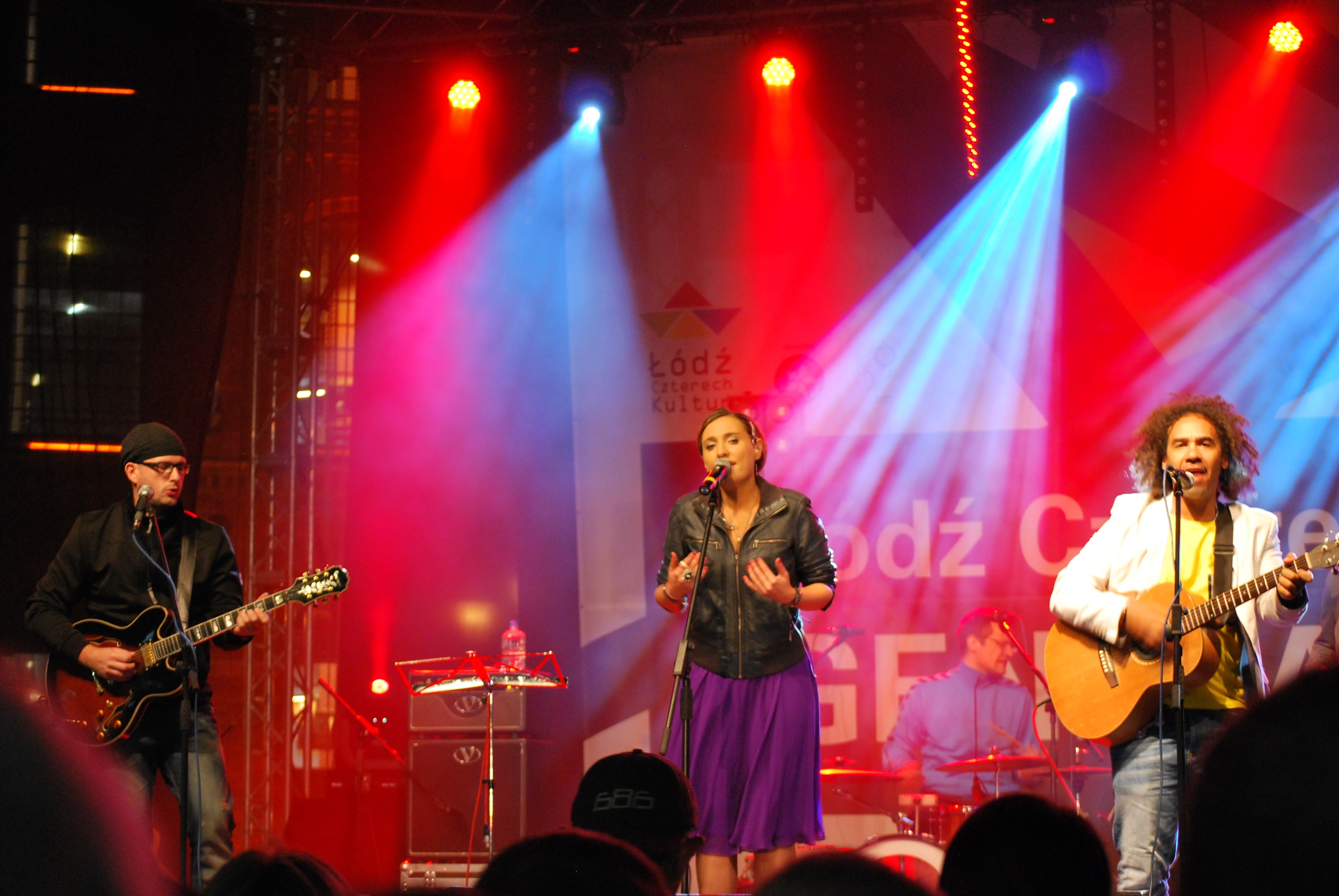
- Mika Urbaniak at Łódź Czterech Kultur festival in 2012
- Born: Michelle Urbaniak; 1980 (age 45–46); New York City, New York, United States
- Years active: 1998-present
- Parent(s): Michał Urbaniak; Urszula Dudziak
- Relatives: Katarzyna Urbaniak (sister)
- Musical career
- Genres: Pop, R&B, jazz, jazz rap
- Label: Sony Music Entertainment Poland Warner Music
- Website: mikaurbaniak.co.uk

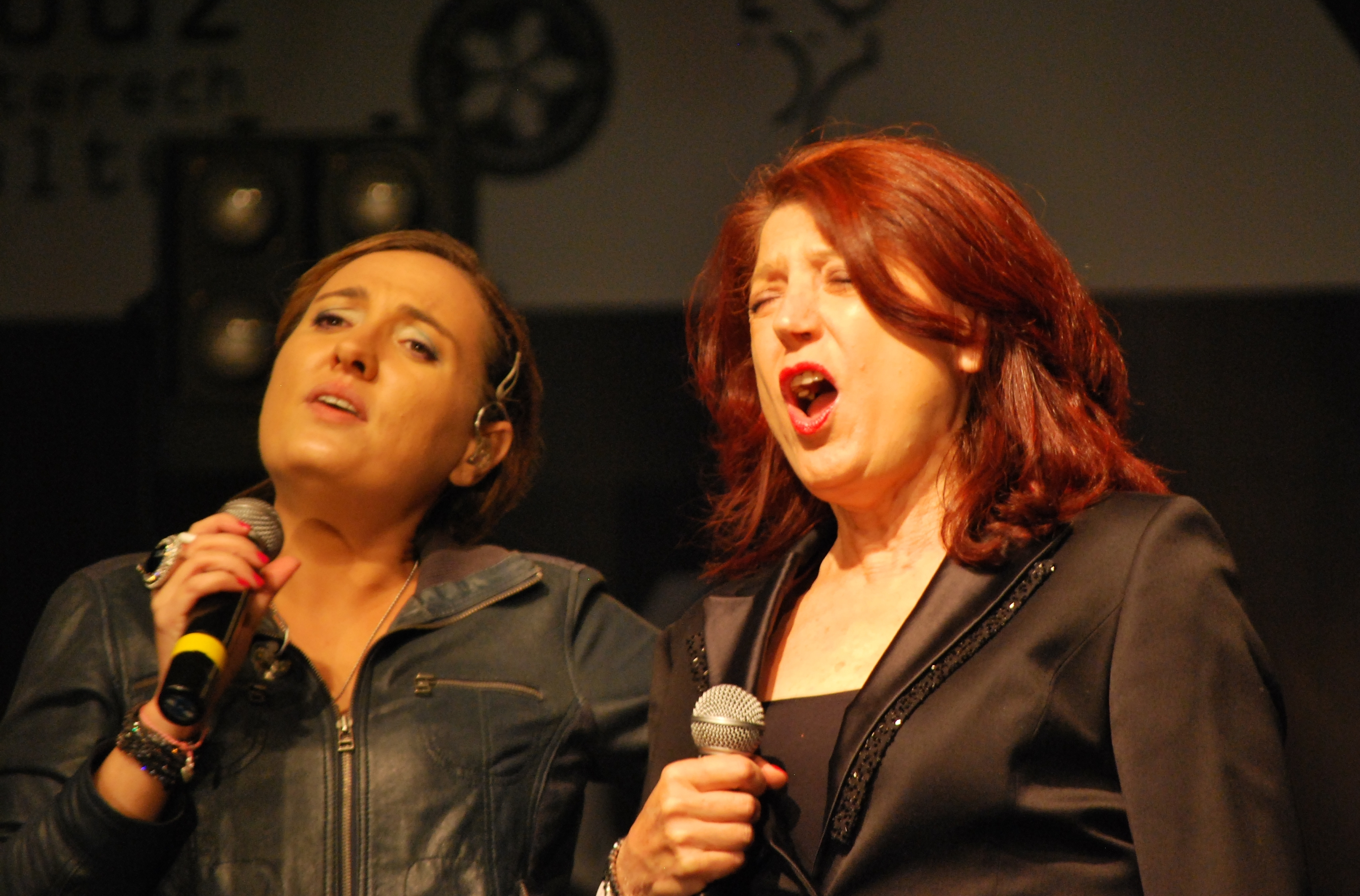
Mika Urbaniak and her mother Urszula Dudziak performing at Łódź Czterech Kultur festival in 2012

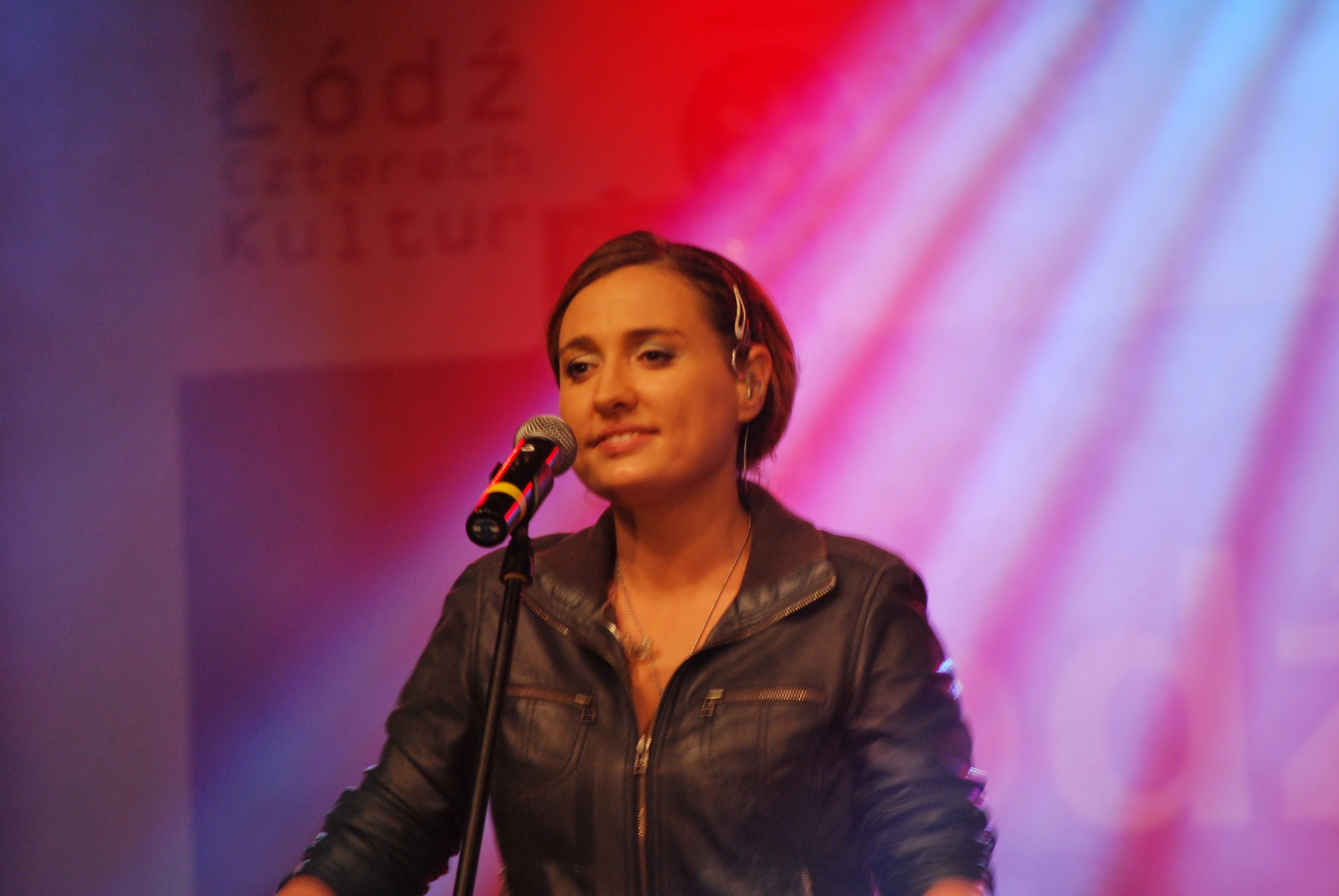
Mika Urbaniak at Łódź Czterech Kultur festival in 2012

Mika Urbaniak (born Michelle Urbaniak in 1980 in New York City) is an American pop singer. She is a daughter of prominent Polish jazz musicians Urszula Dudziak and Michał Urbaniak. Born and raised in the United States, she has lived in Warsaw and London since 2001. Her style is a mixture of pop, jazz and hip-hop. In 2010, she won the Polish Society of the Phonographic Industry award Fryderyk in the category Album of the Year - Pop.

== History ==
Mika Urbaniak started writing her own songs at the age of 11. When she was 14, she performed on stage for the first time. A year later, the first song with her vocals was released. For many years, she collaborated with major Polish artists, such as Smolik, Michał Urbaniak, Grzegorz Markowski, Mieczysław Szcześniak, Novika, O.S.T.R., Liroy and Kayah.

Urbaniak's debut album Closer was released on 27 April 2009 through Sony Music Poland and peaked at no. 2 on the Polish sales chart OLiS. The album was promoted by singles "In My Dreams" and "Lovin' Needs a Deadline", which charted at Polish Radio's chart LP3. In 2010, Closer won the Fryderyk award for Pop Album of the Year.

Her second album, Follow You, released on 24 April 2012, peaked at no. 12. Two songs promoting the album were released in 2012, "Pixelated" and "Don't Speak Too Loud", and both charted at LP3. A music video for the title track "Follow You" was released on YouTube on 1 February 2013.

== Discography ==
=== Studio albums ===
Title	Album details	Peak chart positions
Title	Album details	POL
Closer	Released: 27 April 2009; Label: Sony Music Entertainment Poland	2
Follow You	Released: 24 April 2012; Label: Sony Music Entertainment Poland	12

=== Music videos ===
Year	Song	Album	Source
2009	"In My Dreams"	Closer	
2012	"Pixelated"	Follow You	
2013	"Follow You"	Follow You	

== Awards and nominations ==
=== Fryderyk ===
Year	Nominee / work	Award	Result
2010	Closer	Album of the Year - Pop	Won
