= Lipnik, Bielsko-Biała =

Lipnik
- Osiedle of Bielsko-Biała
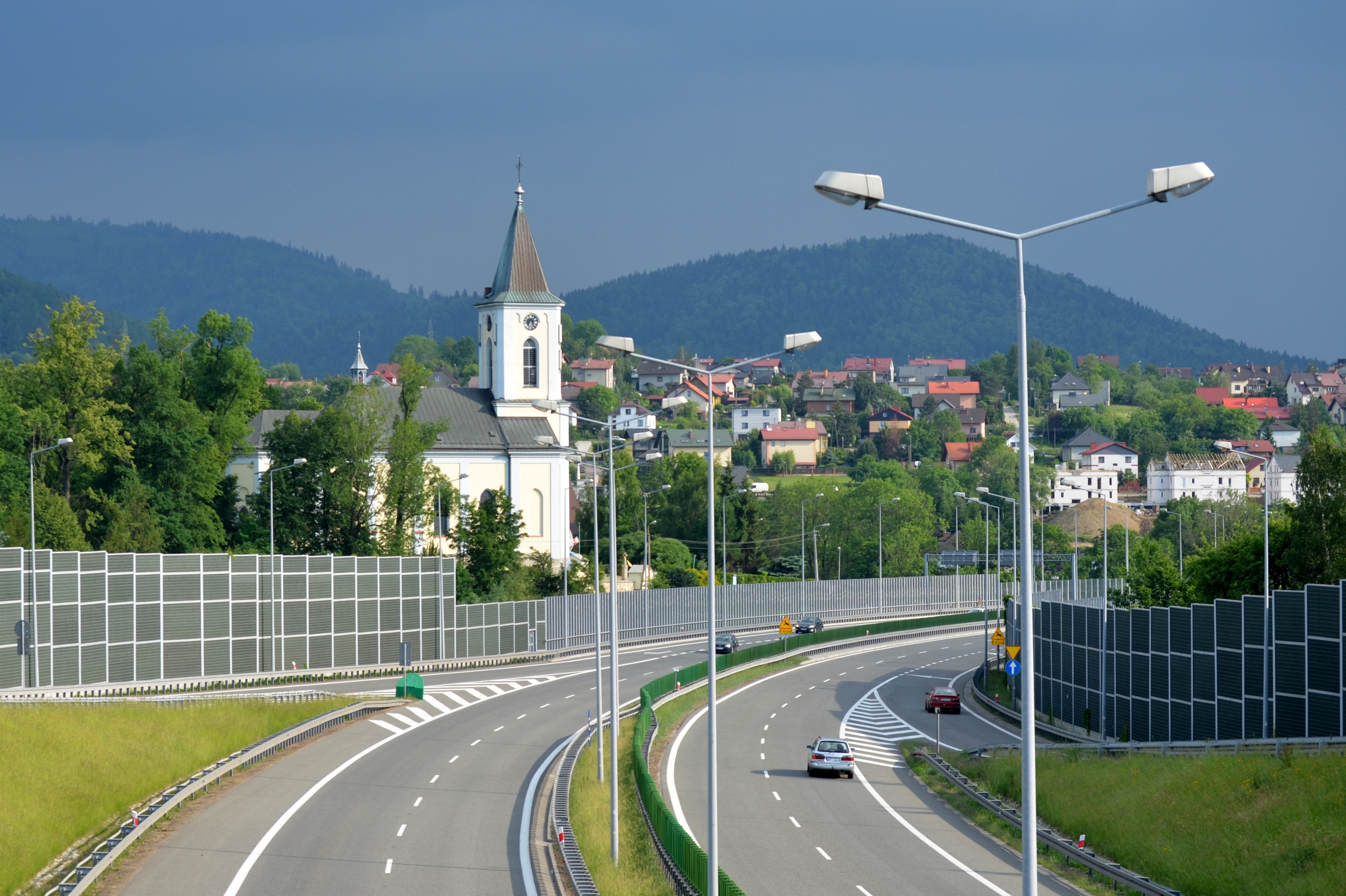
- Centre of Lipnik cut through by the S1 Expressway (2018)

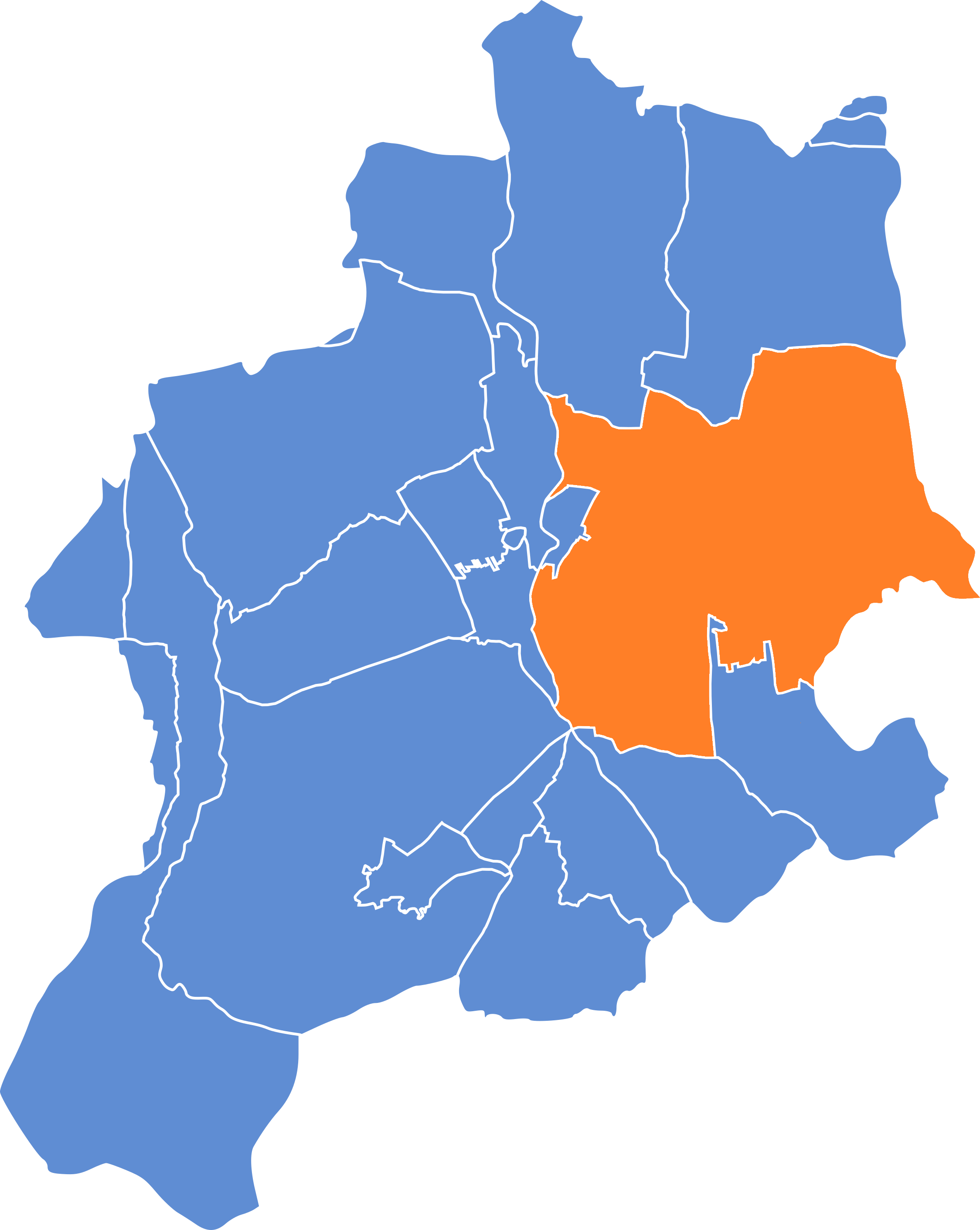
- Location of Lipnik within Bielsko-Biała
- Coordinates: 49°49′10″N 19°5′6″E
- Country: Poland
- Voivodeship: Silesian
- County/City: Bielsko-Biała

Area
  - Total: 8.9317 km^{2} (3.4485 sq mi)

Population (2006)
  - Total: 5,885
  - Density: 658.9/km^{2} (1,707/sq mi)
- Time zone: UTC+1 (CET)
  - Summer (DST): UTC+2 (CEST)
- Area code: (+48) 033

Lipnik (German: Kunzendorf) is an osiedle (district) of Bielsko-Biała in the Silesian Voivodeship of southern Poland, located in the eastern part of the city. Originally a village founded in the 13th century, it was incorporated into the city of Biała in 1925. The district covers an area of 8.9317 km^{2} and had 5,885 inhabitants as of 31 December 2006.

Historically, the settlement was also subdivided into Lipnik Dolny (Lower Lipnik) and Lipnik Górny (Upper Lipnik).

== History ==
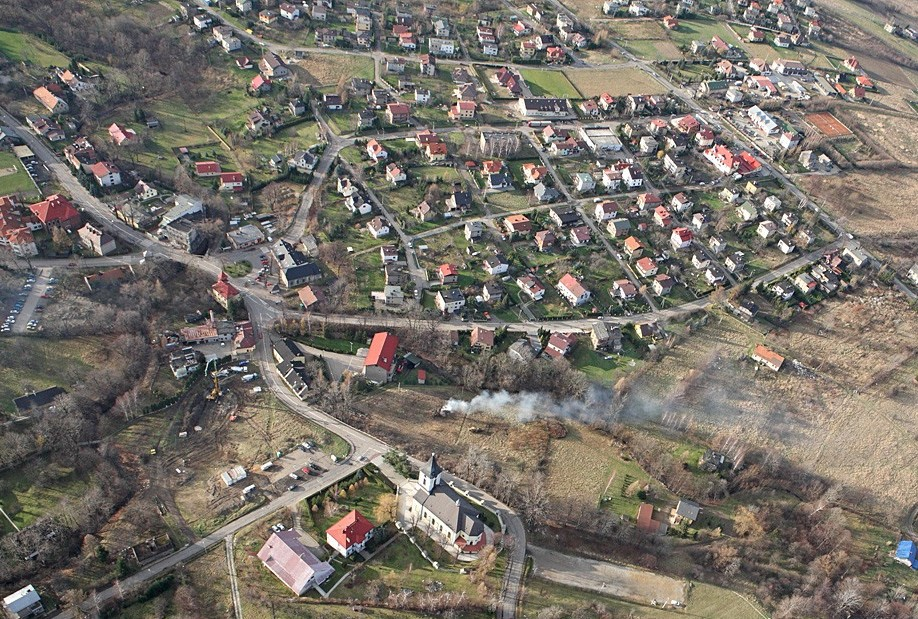
Aerial view of Lipnik (2009)

The village was established in the late 13th century. It was first mentioned in 1326 in the register of Peter's Pence payment among Catholic parishes of Oświęcim deaconry of the Diocese of Kraków as Lipnik. The name was of Slavic origin, derived from tilia trees (Polish: lipa). Later the village was also known under German name of Kunzendorf, as it was later a part of a German language island around Bielsko (German: Bielitz-Bialaer Sprachinsel).

Politically the village belonged initially to the Duchy of Cieszyn and Castellany of Oświęcim, which was in 1315 formed in the process of feudal fragmentation of Poland into the Duchy of Oświęcim, ruled by a local branch of Silesian Piast dynasty. In 1327 the duchy became a fee of the Kingdom of Bohemia. In 1457 Jan IV of Oświęcim agreed to sell the duchy to the Polish Crown, and in the accompanying document issued on 21 February the village was mentioned as Lipnik. The territory of the Duchy of Oświęcim was eventually incorporated into Poland in 1564 and formed Silesian County of Kraków Voivodeship.

In 1564 it became a seat of starostwo niegrodowe. A town of Biała began as a hamlet of Lipnik in the second half of the 16th century. In 1613 Biała was separated from Lipnik. Several other of its hamlets also grew to become independent, like Straconka, Międzybrodzie Lipnickie and Leszczyny.

Upon the First Partition of Poland in 1772 it became part of the Austrian Kingdom of Galicia. In 1789 starostwo of Lipnik was dissolved and the village grew more dependent on the town of Biała. In the 19th century it was industrialized. After World War I and fall of Austria-Hungary it became part of Poland. In 1925 it was absorbed by Biała, which was merged with Bielsko in 1951 to form Bielsko-Biała.

== Born in Lipnik ==
- Johannes Volkelt
- Artur Schnabel, classical pianist who was the first to record all 32 of Beethoven's piano sonatas
- Karol Wojtyla, Sr., the father of Pope John Paul II
