= Biała County, Kingdom of Galicia and Lodomeria =

Biała County Powiat bialski
- Powiat of Kingdom of Galicia and Lodomeria
- 1867–1918
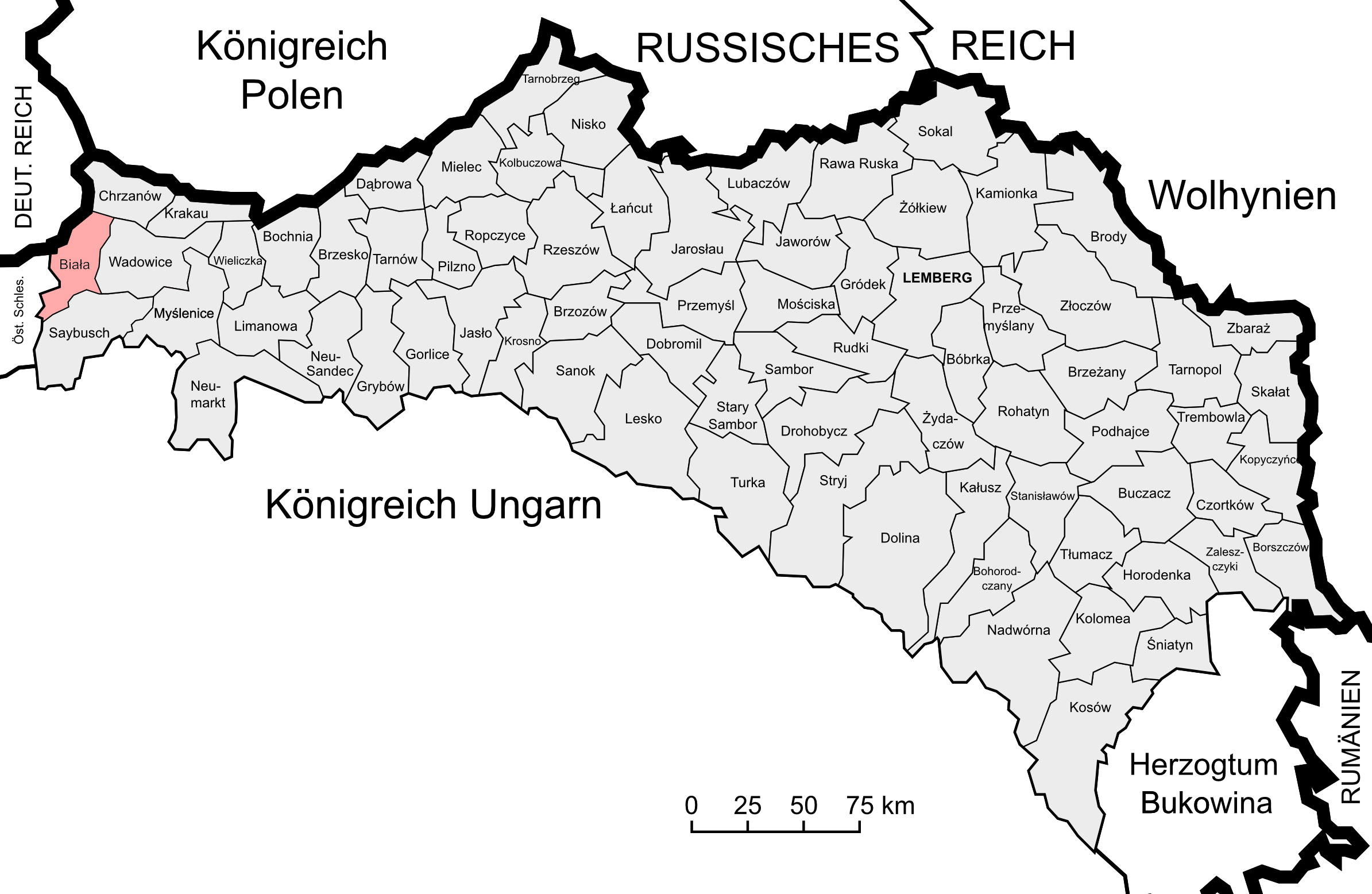
- Location of Biała County within Kingdom of Galicia and Lodomeria.
- Capital: Biała
- History
  - Established: 1867
  - Reorganization into Biała County, Kraków Voivodeship: 1918
- Contained within
  - Country: Austria-Hungary
  - Crown land: Kingdom of Galicia and Lodomeria
Preceded by
Biała District
Oświęcim District
Kęty District
Succeeded by
Oświęcim County
Biała County
- Today part of: Poland

Biała County (Polish: Powiat bialski), Biała District (German: Bezirk Biała), or Biala District (German: Bezirk Biala), was an administrative division of the Kingdom of Galicia and Lodomeria, a Cisleithanian crown land of Austria-Hungary, that existed between 1867 and 1918. The seat of the county was Biała (now part of Bielsko-Biała, Poland).

In 1879 the county had an area of 378.44 square kilometres (146.12 sq mi) and a population of 79,610. It had 74 settlements organized into 63 municipalities. There were 3 county courts located in Biała, Kęty and Oświęcim.

On 1 August 1910 part of the county was detached and united with part of Wadowice County in order to form Oświęcim County. The Kingdom of Galicia and Lodomeria ceased to exist in 1918, with Biała County being incorporated into the Second Republic of Poland, where it was reorganized into Biała County, Kraków Voivodeship.

== County mayors ==
- Władysław Hallauer (1870–1871)
- Jan Hild (1879–1882)
- Eugeniusz Kraus (1890)
- Maciej Biesiadecki (1904–1913)

== Government commissioners ==
- Jan Sałasz (1870)
- Juliusz Prokopczyc (1871)
- Władysław Chądzyński (1879)
- Karol Schmidt, Franciszek Szałowski (1882)
- Franciszek Szałowski (1890)

== County commissioners ==
- Edward Stonawski (1917)

== Bibliography ==
- Szematyzm Królestwa Galicyi i Lodomeryi z Wielkiem Księstwem Krakowskiem na rok 1879, Lviv, 1879 (in Polish)
