= Leszczyny, Bielsko-Biała =

Urban area in Poland

Leszczyny
- Dzielnica
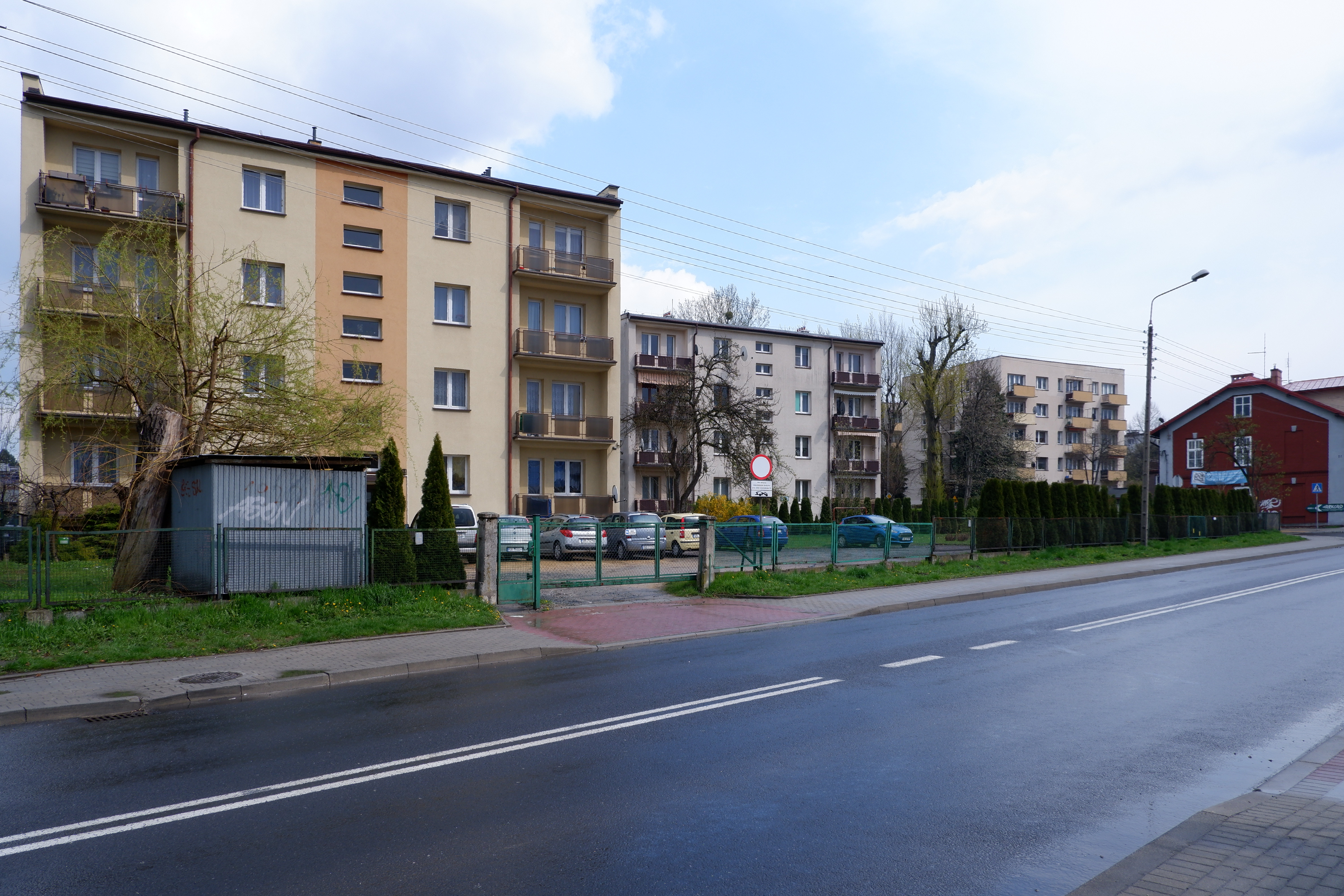

- Location within Poland
- Coordinates: 49°48′01″N 19°03′39″E
- Country: Poland
- Voivodeship: Silesian
- Powiat: Bielsko-Biała
- Osiedle: Lipnik
- SIMC: 0923762

Leszczyny (formerly German: Nussdorf) is a dzielnica of the administrative district of Lipnik, within Bielsko-Biała, Silesian Voivodeship, in southern Poland.

== History ==
Leszczyny was founded by German colonists following the Thirty Years' War, and originally named Nussdorf in reference to the surrounding hazel woods. In the eighteenth century, the settlement developed as a local centre of agriculture and crafts.

The area is a former industrial area of Bielsko-Biała that specialised in textile production. Leszczyny has a volunteer OSP fire service for which an historic facility was built in the 1930s.
