= TSA (band) =

Polish hard rock band

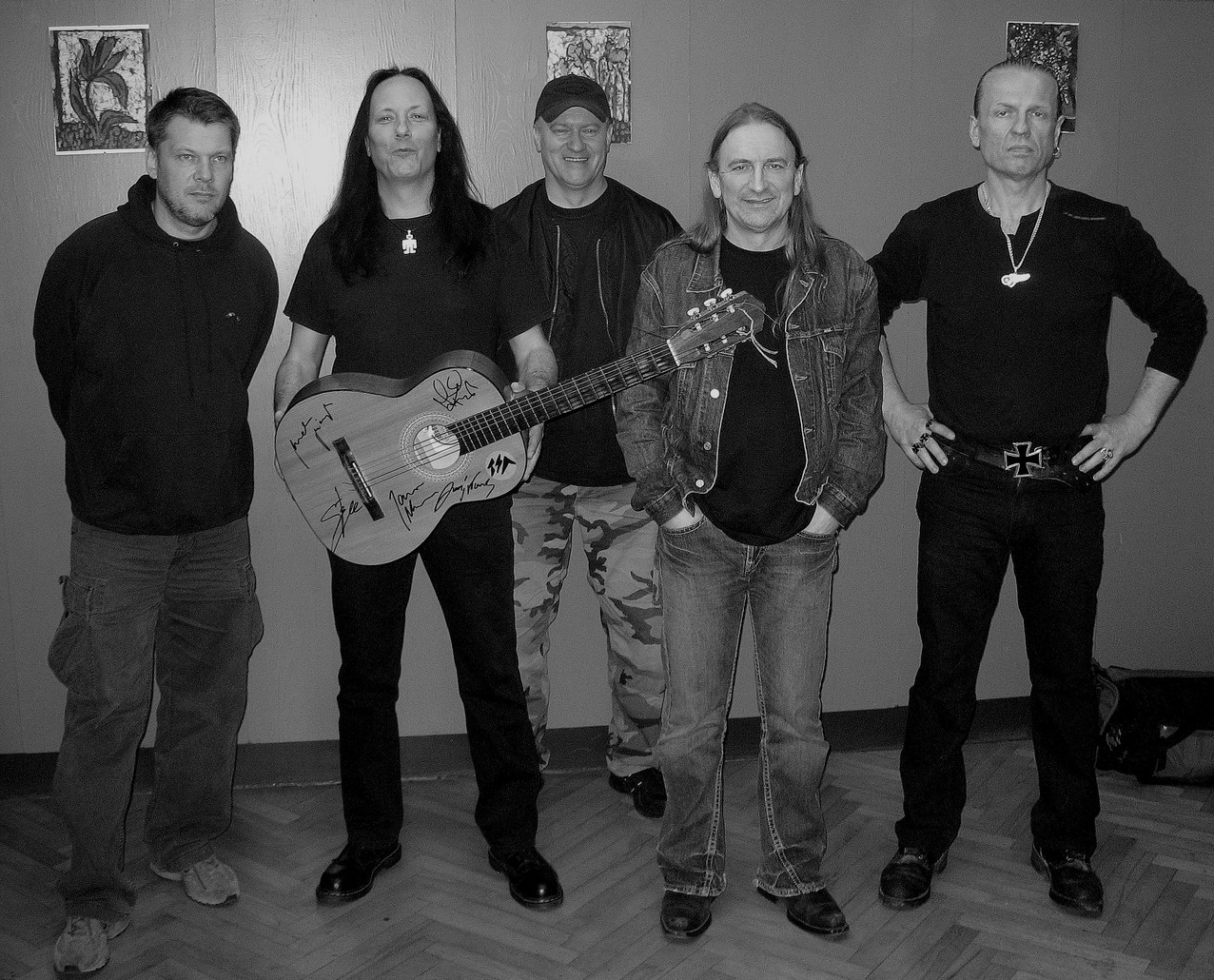
- TSA 2008

Background information
- Origin: Opole, Poland
- Genres: Rock, hard rock, heavy metal
- Years active: 1979–1989; 1990–1992 (TSA-Evolution); 1991–1992; 1998–1999; 2001–2018; 2021–present
- Labels: Tonpress, Polton, Mega Records, Warner Music Poland, TMM Polska, Zic Zac, Metal Mind Productions
- Website: tsa.com.pl

TSA is a Polish hard rock and heavy metal band.

== History ==
The band formed in 1979 in Opole as an initiative of guitarist Andrzej Nowak. The original line-up additionally included Stefan Machel (guitar), Janusz Niekrasz (bass) and Marek Kapłon (drums). TSA was originally an instrumental band. It won a "battle of the bands" during the 1981 Jarocin Festival at which members met Marek Piekarczyk, a singer in Sektor A. He debuted as TSA's vocalist a month later at the Pop Session festival in Sopot.

The band's song "Zwierzenia kontestatora" ("Confessions Of A Contestant") appears in the musical documentary Behind the Iron Curtain, which documents the heavy metal band Iron Maiden's first visit to Poland and other countries in Eastern Europe. The song is used as background music during the scene filmed in the music club Remont.

TSA's song "Marsz wilków" ("The Marching Of The Wolves") is used in the 1983 Polish children's movie Akademia Pana Kleksa (Academy of Mr. Kleks) – a film based on Jan Brzechwa's 1964 book.

The group disbanded on the eve of the 1990s, but came back together in the spring of 2001 to record and perform a 'classical line-up' of music.

As is common of heavy metal bands with acronym-based names, "TSA" may have no meaning, although in a 2003 press release one of the founders claimed that the acronym originally meant "Tajne Stowarzyszenie Abstynentów" – "Teetotallers' Secret Association".

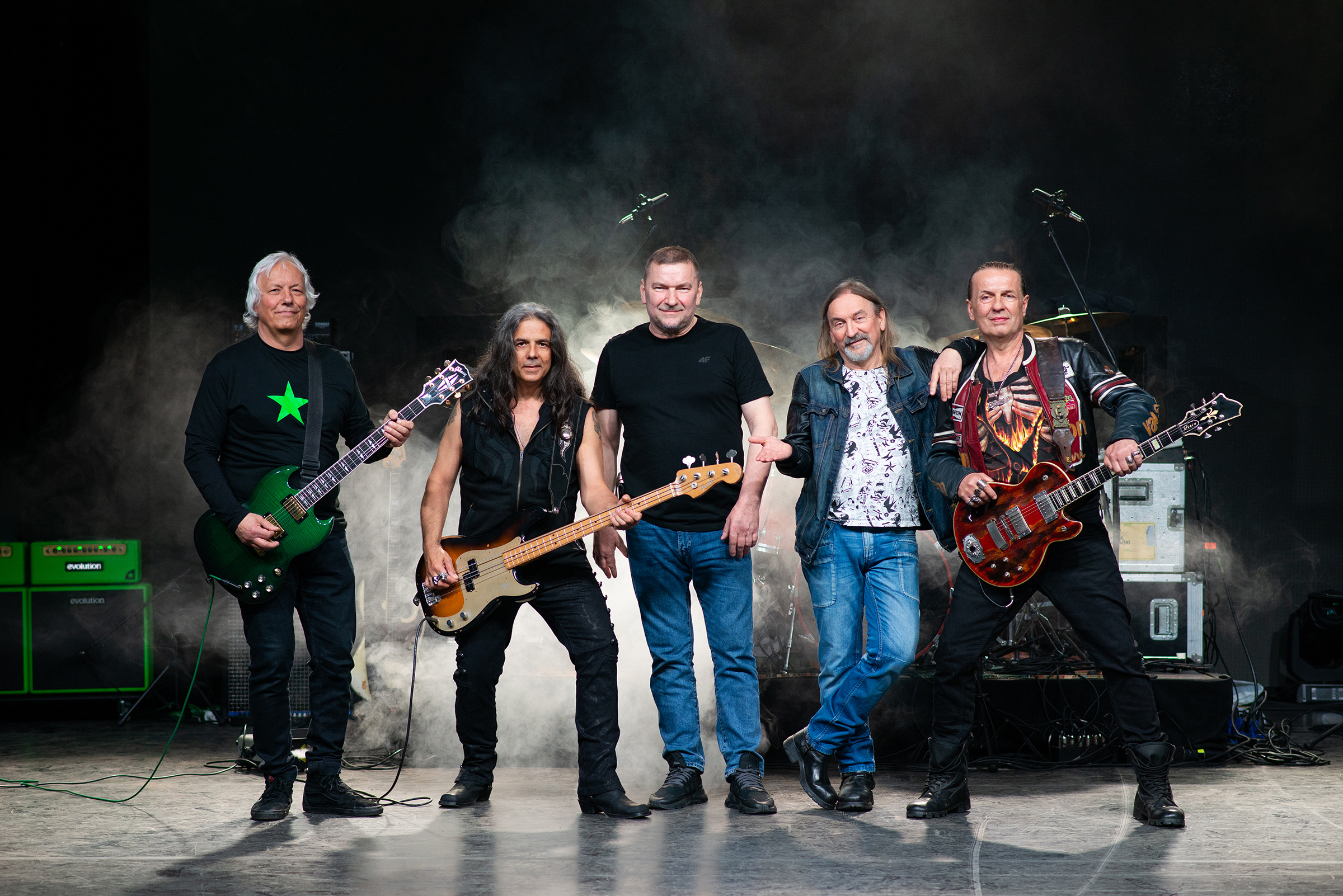
TSA 2021 - from the left: Stefan Machel, Paweł Mąciwoda, Zbigniew Kraszewski, Marek Piekarczyk and Andrzej Nowak

In 2018, the band suspended its activities. In May 2021, there was a reactivation with the core of the team supplemented by Zbyszek Kraszewski and Paweł Mąciwoda.

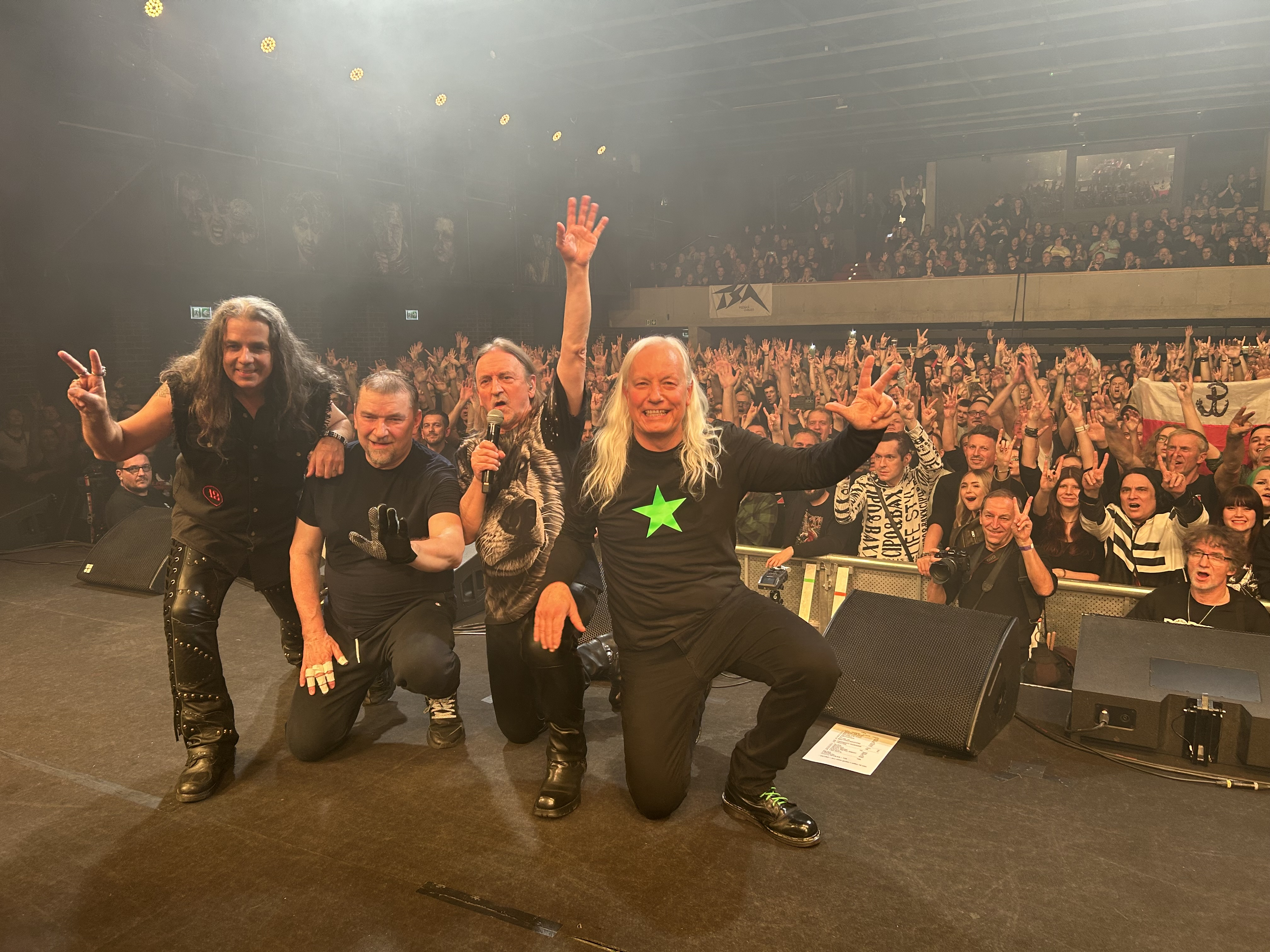
TSA 2024 - from the left: Paweł Mąciwoda, Zbigniew Kraszewski, Marek Piekarczyk, Stefan Machel.

== Members ==
Current line-up

- Marek Piekarczyk − lead vocals (1981–1989, 1991–1992, 1998–1999, 2001–present)
- Stefan Machel − guitar, backing vocals (1980–1989, 2001–present)
- Paweł Mąciwoda − bass guitar (1998–1999, 2021–present)
- Zbigniew Kraszewski − drums, backing vocals (1984–1989, 2021–present)

Former members

- Andrzej Nowak (†2022) − guitar (1979–1983, 1987–1989, 1991–1992, 1998–1999, 2001–2022)
- Janusz Niekrasz − bass guitar, backing vocals (1980–1989, 2001–2018)
- Marek Kapłon − drums (1980, 1981–1983, 2001–2018)
- Paweł Stompór − guitar (1991–1992)
- Marek Raduli − guitar (1980)
- Antoni Degutis − guitar (1984–1986, 1998–1999)
- Ryszard Petelnik − guitar (1980)
- Andrzej Walczak − bass guitar (1991–1992)
- Tomasz Zatwarnicki − bass guitar (1979)
- Dariusz Biłyk − drums (1991–1992)
- Duane Cleveland − drums (1998–1999; US citizen, only non-Polish member in band history)
- Leszek Wojtas − drums (1980)

TSA-Evolution line-up

- Janusz Pyzowski − lead vocals (1990–1992)
- Stefan Machel − guitar (1990–1992)
- Piotr Łukaszewski − guitar (1990–1992)
- Janusz Niekrasz − bass guitar (1990–1992)
- Zbigniew Kraszewski − drums (1990–1992)

== Discography ==
Title	Album details	Peak chart positions
Title	Album details	POL
TSA	Released: March 1983; Label: Polton; Formats: LP, CD	8
Spunk!	Released: February 1984; Label: Mega Records; Formats: LP, CD	—
Heavy Metal World	Released: 1984; Label: Polton; Formats: LP, CD	7
Heavy Metal World (English-language version)	Released: 1986; Label: Mausoleum Records; Formats: LP, CD	—
Rock 'n' Roll	Released: April 1988; Label: Tonpress; Formats: LP, CD, CS	14
52 dla przyjaciół	Released: September 1992; Label: Zic Zac; Formats: CD, CS	—
Proceder	Released: 23 March 2004; Label: Metal Mind; Formats: CD, CS	2
Dream Team Live 2021	Released: 08 December 2023; Label: Mystic Production; Formats: CD, DVD	
"—" denotes a recording that did not chart or was not released in that territory.
