= Alicja Majewska =

Polish singer (born 1948)

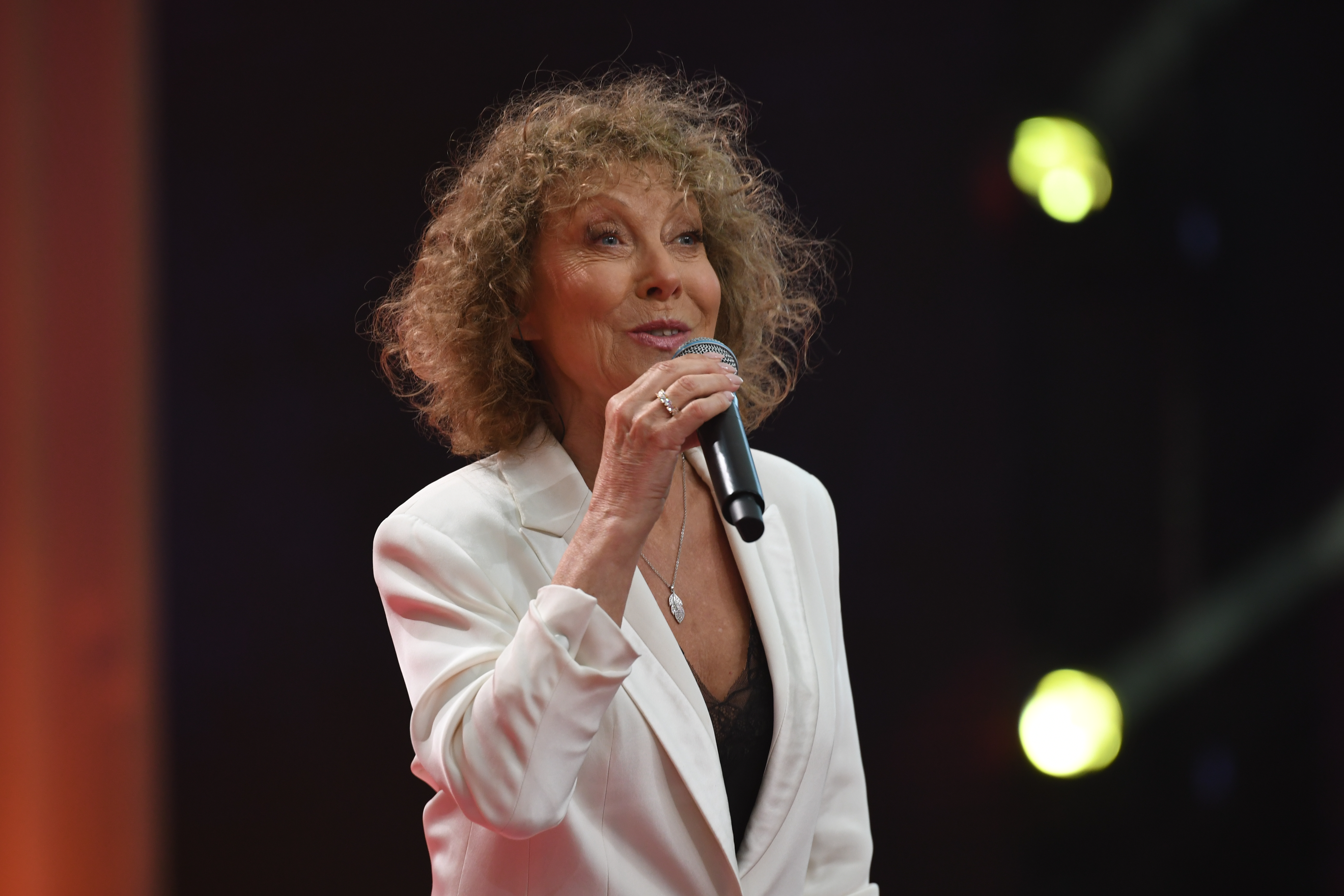
- Alicja Majewska in Sopot in 2023
- Born: May 30, 1948 (age 78); Wrocław, Poland
- Education: University of Warsaw
- Occupation: Singer
- Spouse: Janusz Budzyński (m. 1972; div. 1984)
- Musical career
- Genres: Pop, Jazz, Adult Contemporary
- Instrument: Vocals
- Years active: 1968-present
- Labels: Polskie Nagrania Muza, Fonografika
- Website: www.alicjamajewska.com.pl

Alicja Majewska (born May 30, 1948, in Wrocław, Poland) is a Polish singer. From 1971 to 1974, she was a member of the band Partita as a vocalist. In 1975, she received the main award at the National Festival of Polish Song in Opole. She was also awarded a Grand Prix at the 1980 festival in Rostock, and was honored in Havana (1985). She received the "Gloria Artis" medal.

== Biography ==
She spent her early childhood in Olbierzowice, where her parents were teachers.

She is a graduate of the Faculty of Psychology and Pedagogy at the University of Warsaw in the field of andragogy. She made her debut in 1968 at the 4th Soviet Song Festival in Zielona Góra.

Honored with the Bronze (2005) and Gold (2020) Medal "For Merit to Culture Gloria Artis".

From 2019 to 2022, she participated as a trainer in the first three editions of the TVP2 program The Voice Senior. She returned for her fourth season in 2026 after a three-season hiatus.

== Discography ==
- 1976 Bywają takie dni
- 1987 Piosenki Korcza i Młynarskiego
- 1989 For New Love
- 1991 Kolędy w teatrze STU – with Halina Frąckowiak and Andrzej Zaucha
- 1994 Jeszcze się tam żagiel bieli – The best of
- 1997 Świat w kolorze nadziei
- 1999 Być kobietą – Złota kolekcja
- 2005 Odkryjemy miłość nieznaną
- 2006 Majewska – Korcz – Live
- 2006 Idzie kolęda, polska kolęda
- 2011 Pieśni sakralne
- 2016 Wszystko może się stać
- 2019 Żyć się chce
