= Urszula Dudziak =

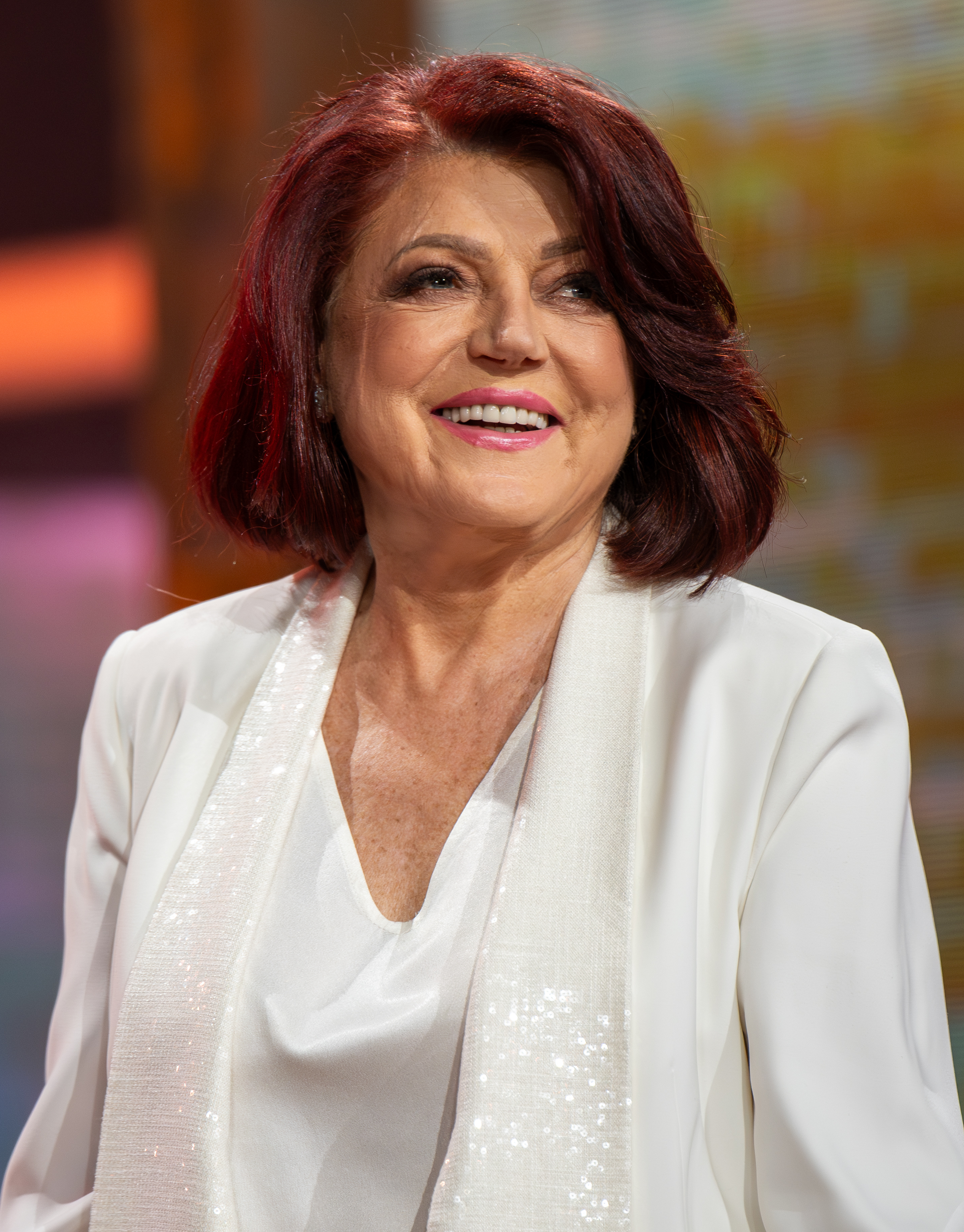
- Urszula Dudziak in 2025

Background information
- Born: Urszula Bogumiła Dudziak; 22 October 1943 (age 82); Straconka, German-occupied Poland
- Genres: Vocal Jazz, Avant-Garde Jazz
- Occupation: Vocalist
- Years active: 1958–present
- Labels: Inner City, Kayax
- Website: www.urszuladudziak.pl

Urszula Bogumiła Dudziak-Urbaniak (born 22 October 1943) is a Polish jazz vocalist. She has worked with Krzysztof Komeda, Michał Urbaniak (her ex-husband), Gil Evans, Archie Shepp, and Lester Bowie. In 2007, her 1970s song "Papaya" gained widespread popularity in Asia and Latin America.

== Career ==
Dudziak was born in the Straconka, now a neighbourhood of Bielsko-Biała, Poland. She studied piano, but began to sing in the late 50s after hearing records by Ella Fitzgerald. Within a few years, she was one of the most popular jazz artists in her native country. She met and later married Michał Urbaniak. In the late 1960s, the couple began to tour overseas and in the 1970s settled in New York City.

Dudziak customarily eschews words in favour of wordless vocalising that is far more adventurous than scat. Already gifted with a five-octave vocal range, Dudziak employs electronic devices to extend possibilities of her voice. She has frequently worked with leading contemporary musicians, including Archie Shepp and Lester Bowie, and was a member of the Vocal Summit group, with Jay Clayton, Jeanne Lee, Bobby McFerrin, Norma Winstone, Sting, and Lauren Newton. Dudziak has also co-operated and performed with her fellow Polish female jazz vocalist Grażyna Auguścik.

On 11 November 2009, Dudziak was awarded the Knight's Cross of the Order of Polonia Restituta by President Lech Kaczyński.

=== Papaya dance ===
In 2007, Dudziak's classic 1970s song "Papaya" saw a resurgence in popularity in the Philippines where it was regularly featured in the local noontime TV game show Pilipinas, Game Ka Na Ba?. A favourite track for Filipino drag queens as lip-synch material in the '70s gay disco/bar scene, the song then saw a revival when a TV host danced to the tune, helping to spread the popularity of the song to Latin America and the US. The dance has then been featured in several news programs, including MSNBC, and Reuters. On 21 March 2008, the dance was featured on ABC's Good Morning America, where the hosts also danced to the song. Before the breakthrough of papaya dance in 2007, the song Papaya became a success in Brazil in 1970s as the opening theme of the original version telenovela Anjo Mau, produced by TV Globo in 1976.

== Personal life ==
Dudziak and Michał Urbaniak are divorced, together they have two daughters: pop singer Mika (Michelle, born 1980) and sculptor Kasia. After the divorce, she was in a relationship with Jerzy Kosiński for four years; Kosinski left her a note just before his suicide. In 1993, she married Swedish captain Benght Dahllof. Dudziak owns apartments in Manhattan, Sweden and Warsaw. Her brother Leszek was jazz drummer known for his work with Krzysztof Komeda.

On 8 March 2011, she released her autobiography called Wyśpiewam wam wszystko (I'll sing everything for you).

== Gallery ==
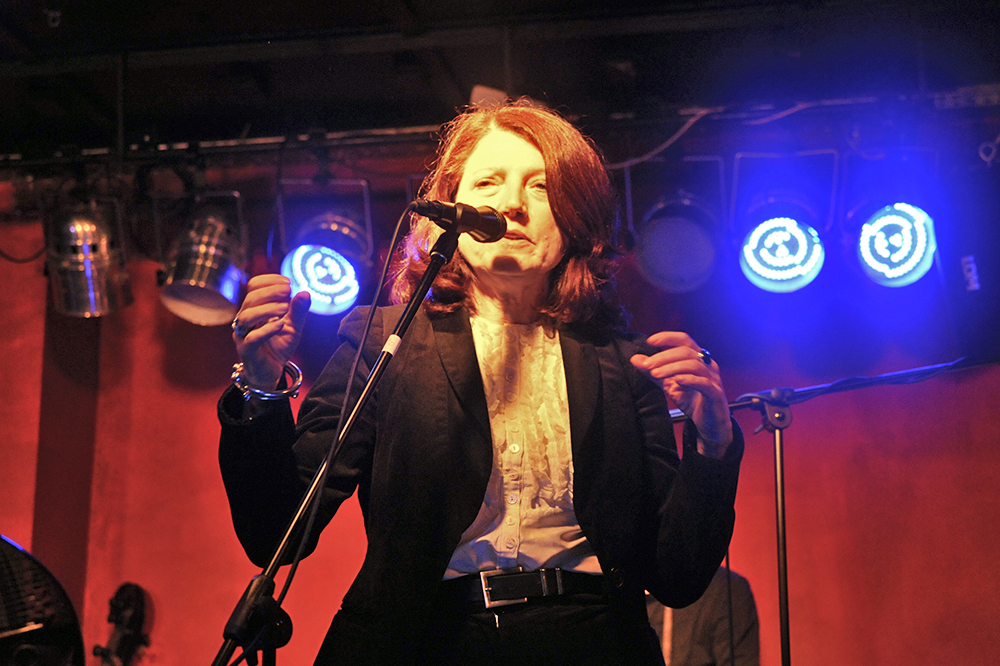
Jam session in connection with Jazz Jamboree 2010, November 2010, Warsaw, Poland.

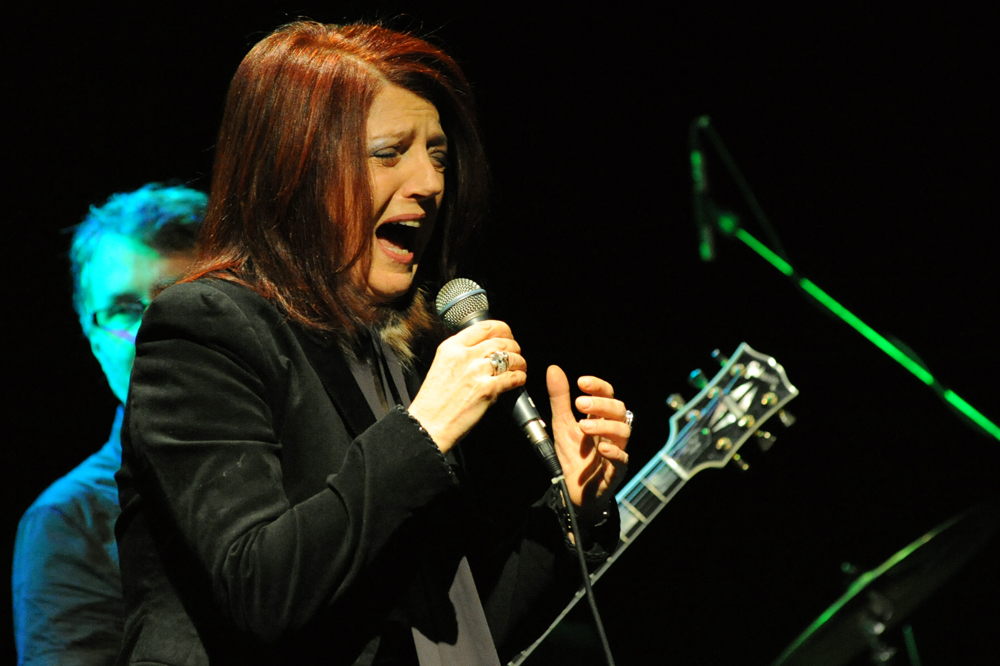
Aid concert for saxophonist Tomasz Szukalski, November 2010, Warsaw, Poland.

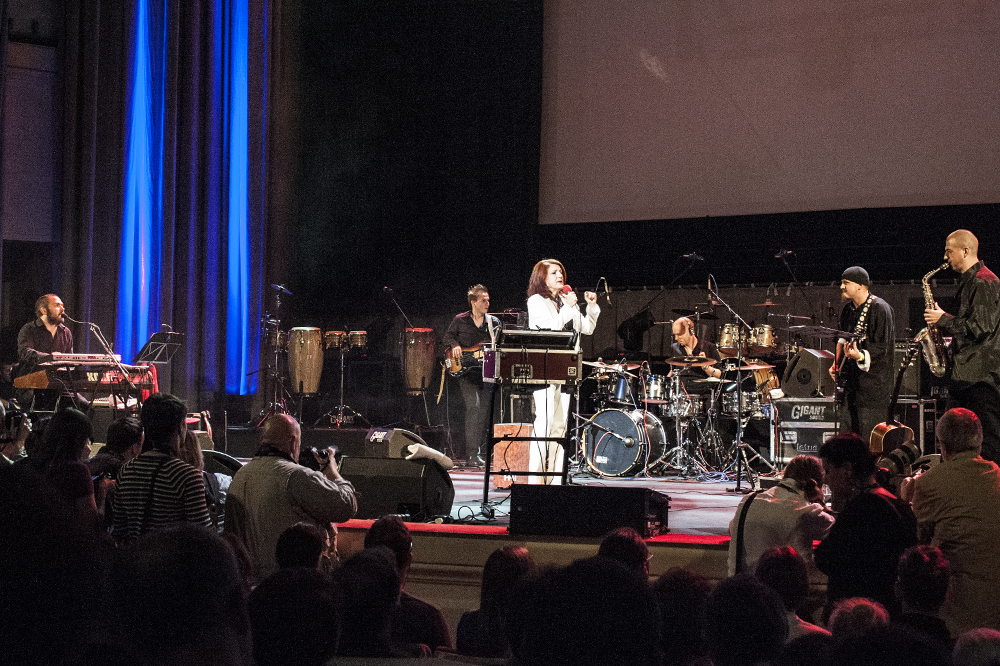
Performing with backing group Superband at the Cross Culture Festival, Warsaw, Poland, September 2011.

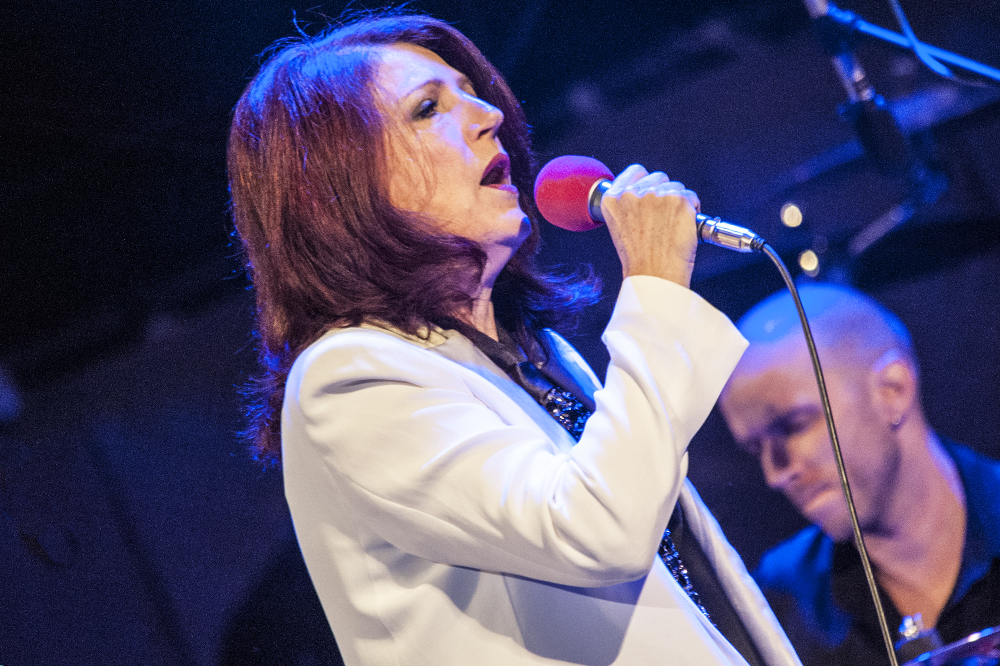
Cross Culture Festival, Warsaw, Poland, September 2011.

== Discography ==
=== As leader ===
- Newborn Light with Adam Makowicz (Cameo, 1972)
- Urszula (Arista, 1975)
- Midnight Rain (Arista, 1977)
- Future Talk (Inner City, 1979)
- High Horse (CTI, 1984)
- Magic Lady (In+Out, 1989)
- Live at Warsaw Jazz Festival 1991 (Jazzmen, 1993)
- Koledy with Grazyna Auguscik (Voice Magic, 1996)
- Malowany Ptak (Polonia, 1997)
- To I Hola with Grazyna Auguscik (Selles, 2000)
- Forever Green/Zawsze Zielona (Green Town of Jazz, 2008)
- Super Band Live at Jazz Cafe (EMI, 2009)
- Wszystko Gra (Kayax, 2013)

=== As guest ===
With Michal Urbaniak

- Fusion III (Columbia, 1975)
- Heritage (MPS, 1978)
- We'll Remember Komeda (MPS, 1973)
- Zycie Pisane Na Orkiestre (Ubx, 2001)
- Smiles Ahead (Ubx, 2012)

With Gil Evans

- Live at Umbria Jazz Vol. 1 (EGEA, 2000)

With others

- Arif Mardin, Journey (Atlantic, 1974)
- Ulla, Ulla (Pop Eye, 1982)
- Vocal Summit, Sorrow Is Not Forever—Love Is (Moers Music, 1983)
- Vocal Summit, Live at Willisau: Conference of the Birds (ITM, 1992)

== Filmography ==
- 1980 – Papaya, czyli Skąd się biorą dziewczynki – main role, music
- 1982 – Percussion Summit – minor role
- 1983 – Vocal Summit – minor role
- 1995 – Malowany chłopiec – music
- 1985 – Urszula Dudziak – waga – main role
- 2000 – Ponad tęczą – music
- 2001 – Eden – music performance (vocal)
- 2002 – Zielona karta – music, song performances
- 2005 – Panna młoda – music
- 2007 – Wiersz na Manhattanie – main role
- 2007 – Niania – herself
- 2008 – Urszula Dudziak: Życie jest piękne – document about her
- 2011 – Bitwa na głosy – as team leader
- 2019 – The Voice Senior – herself, as a coach
- 2020 – The Voice of Poland – herself, as a coach
