= Quiet Life (film) =

2024 film by Alexandros Avranas

- Directed by: Alexandros Avranas
- Written by: Stavros Pamballis; Alexandros Avranas
- Starring: Chulpan Khamatova; Grigoriy Dobrygin; Naomi Lamp; Miroslava Pashutina; Eleni Roussinou
- Cinematography: Olympia Mytilinaiou
- Edited by: Dounia Sichov
- Music by: Tuomas Kantelinen
- Production company: Les Films du Worso
- Distributed by: Elle Driver
- Release date: 29 August 2024 (Venice)
- Running time: 99 minutes
- Countries: France; Germany; Sweden; Estonia; Greece; Finland
- Languages: Russian; Swedish; English

Quiet Life is a 2024 drama film directed by Alexandros Avranas. It stars Chulpan Khamatova, Grigoriy Dobrygin, Naomi Lamp, and Miroslava Pashutina as a refugee family dealing with the effects of resignation syndrome. It premiered at the 81st Venice International Film Festival on 29 August 2024.

== Premise ==
In 2018, Natalia, Sergei, and their two daughters, Alina and Katja, are living in Sweden, having fled their native Russia. After their asylum application is rejected, Katja falls into a mysterious coma caused by resignation syndrome.

== Cast ==
- Chulpan Khamatova as Natalia
- Grigoriy Dobrygin as Sergei
- Naomi Lamp as Alina
- Miroslava Pashutina as Katja
- Eleni Roussinou as Adriana

== Production ==
Director Alexandros Avranas was inspired to create the film after reading an article about resignation syndrome in The New Yorker. For his research, he met with Dr. Elisabeth Hultcrantz and Dr. Karl Sallin, leading experts of the condition. Filming began in 2018.

== Release ==
A clip from the film was released on 20 August 2024. It premiered at the 81st Venice International Film Festival on 29 August 2024 as part of the Orizzonti competition.

== Reception ==
Marc van de Klashorst of the International Cinephile Society gave the film three-and-a-half out of five stars and called it "a film that keeps its audience at arm's length, but also one that makes its message resonate and shows that humanity in the end conquers all."

Serena Seghedoni of Loud and Clear Reviews gave the film two out of five stars, calling it "a jumbled mess" and writing, "Alexandros Avranas' Quiet Life doesn't quite know what to do with the fascinating, real-life phenomenon at its center, resulting in a mess of a movie with little to say."

Allan Hunter of Screen Daily called the film "unsetlling" and "coolly intriguing".

== Accolades ==
Award	Date of ceremony	Category	Result	Ref.
Venice Film Festival	7 September 2024	Orizzonti Award for Best Film	Nominated	

== See also ==
- Asylum seekers with apathetic refugee children
- Life Overtakes Me, a 2019 documentary about resignation syndrome in refugee children
