= Autograph suit of Sandy Powell =

Two-piece suit auctioned for charity in 2020

During the film awards season in early 2020, costume designer Sandy Powell wore a cream calico toile (a tailor's mock-up) two-piece suit of her own design, and collected celebrities' autographs on it in permanent marker. The suit was then auctioned to raise funds for the purchase of artist, filmmaker and gay rights activist Derek Jarman's cottage at Dungeness in Kent, England. The suit was bought by Edwina Dunn, who then donated it to the Theatre and Performance Collection of the Victoria and Albert Museum (V&A) in London. In April 2022 the suit featured in an episode of the BBC Two series Secrets of the Museum.

== Origin ==
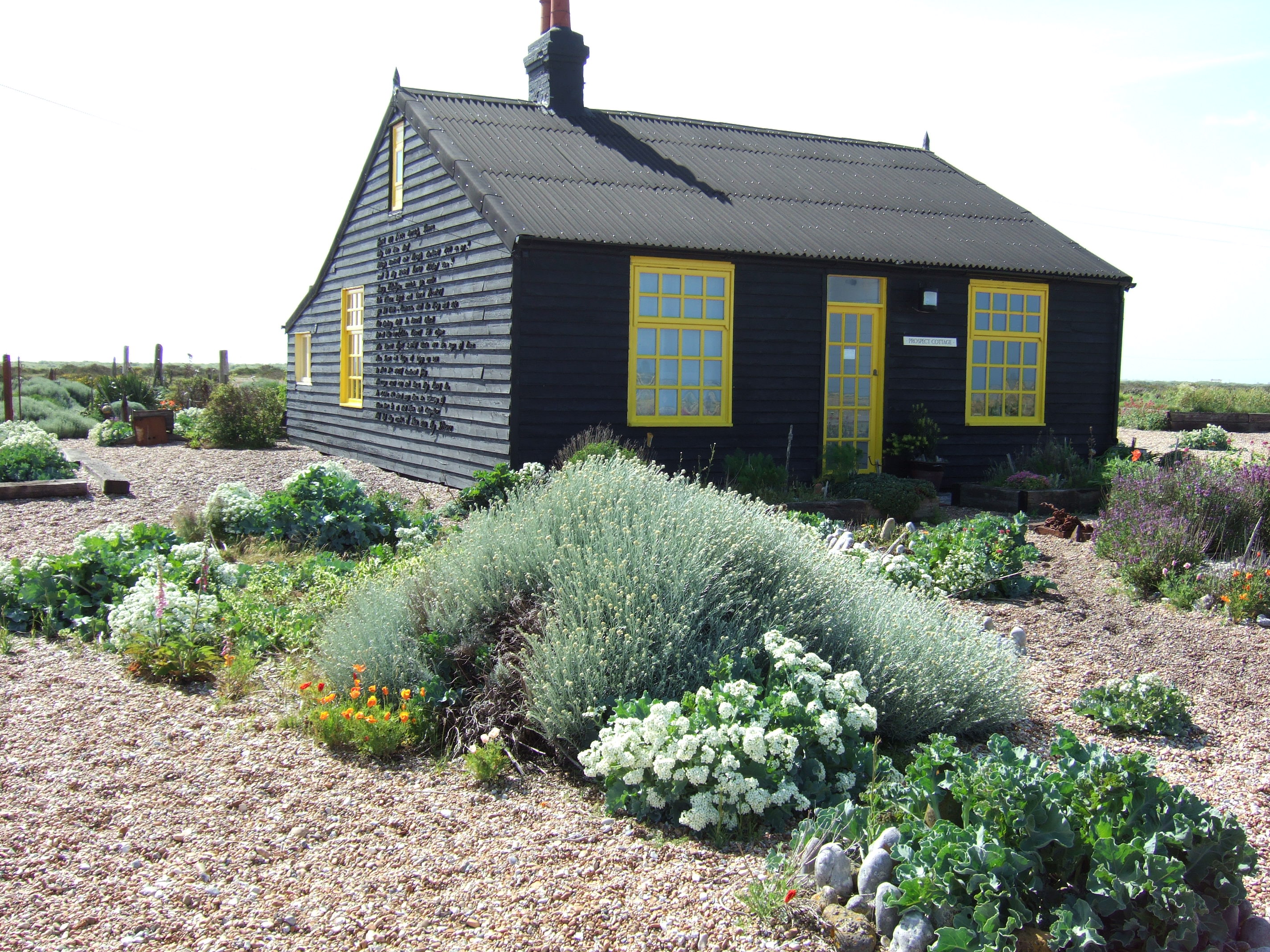
Prospect Cottage

In 1985 artist, filmmaker and gay rights activist Derek Jarman gave Sandy Powell her first job in the film industry, as the costume designer for his film Caravaggio. The year Caravaggio was released, Jarman was diagnosed with HIV. Shortly afterwards, he moved into Prospect Cottage, a Victorian fisherman's cottage on the shingle beach at Dungeness in Kent, in the shadow of Dungeness Nuclear Power Station. Jarman died in 1994, and the cottage was bequeathed to his partner Keith Collins. The house was put up for sale in 2018 after Collins' death, its interior still containing Jarman's belongings, art and materials, and artwork by Jarman's friends and admirers, including Maggi Hambling, John Maybury, Gus Van Sant and Richard Hamilton.

In January 2020, with Prospect Cottage at risk of being sold privately and its contents dispersed, the Art Fund began a fundraising drive to secure the cottage's future. To help with this, Powell decided to collect celebrities' signatures on a suit toile she had designed (getting the signatures while wearing it), and then auction the suit. As Powell was to be awarded the Dilys Powell Award for Excellence in Film at the Critics' Circle awards, and was nominated for Best Costume Design for The Irishman at both the BAFTAs and the Oscars, she had plenty of opportunity to collect autographs at the coming awards ceremonies.

== The suit ==
The two-piece suit (jacket and trousers) is a toile, a tailor's mock-up to test a design before expensive material is committed. The toile is the toile for the suits that Powell wore to the 2017 and 2019 Oscars and BAFTAS. The toile is made of cream calico with rough stitching, with the jacket fixed by two large safety pins. It was deliberately chosen to be a "blank canvas" on which to collect signatures. Over a six-week period during the 2020 film awards season, Powell attended The Critics' Circle awards ceremony on 30 January 2020, the 2020 BAFTAs award show on 2 February 2020 and the 2020 Oscars ceremony on 9 February 2020, plus other events, and collected over 200 signatures on the suit. Powell noted that some people chose where to sign, while others were told, with "only girls on the bum".

The suit was auctioned online between 4 and 11 March 2020 by Phillips Auction House, after being displayed in the foyer of its gallery in Berkeley Square, London, along with four handwritten keys identifying almost all the signatures on the various parts of the suit. The suit sold for £16,000. It was purchased by Edwina Dunn, who then donated it to the V&A Museum, on behalf of The Female Lead, an educational charity that drives change and equality for women. The suit underwent conservation cleaning at the museum, and Powell visited the museum to help choose the mannequin on which it was to be displayed. Powell's handwritten keys were to be mounted alongside the suit in the gallery when it was to go on display. The suit was placed on display in April 2022 in Room 104 of the V&A's Theatre & Performance galleries.

The campaign to save Prospect Cottage was a success, and it will host residencies for artists, academics and gardeners.

== List of most of the signatories on the suit ==
By the time of its auction there were over 200 signatures on the suit. Powell noted in the 2022 television programme Secrets of the Museum that some of the signatures had yet to be identified. Those who signed it include:

- Matt Aitkin
- Waad Al-Kateab
- Marco Alessi
- Alfie Allen
- Pedro Almodóvar
- Joe Alwyn
- Elena Andreicheva
- Aziz Ansari
- Darren Aronofsky
- Colleen Atwood
- Amani Ballour
- Baz Bamigboye
- Antonio Banderas
- Elizabeth Banks
- Daniel Battsek
- Noah Baumbach
- Jarin Blaschke
- Bong Joon-ho
- Shane Boris
- Edith Bowman
- Danny Boyle
- Javier Braier
- Mark Bridges
- Derek Brown
- Andrew Buckland
- Jessie Buckley
- Gerard Butler
- Greg Butler
- Asa Butterfield
- Kate Byers
- Ruth Carter
- Dean-Charles Chapman
- Gwendoline Christie
- Michele Clapton
- Patricia Clarkson
- Olivia Colman
- Paul Croal
- Alfonso Cuarón
- Beverly D'Angelo
- Fejmi Daut
- Robert De Niro
- Roger Deakins
- Lily Rose Depp
- Laura Dern
- Alexandre Desplat
- Kaitlyn Dever
- Leonardo DiCaprio
- Adam Driver
- Jacqueline Durran
- Finola Dwyer
- Sigrid Dyekjær
- Carol Dysinger
- Billie Eilish
- Robert Eggers
- Cynthia Erivo
- Leandro Estebecorena
- Elle Fanning
- Beanie Feldstein
- Julian Fellowes
- Peter Fillingham
- Dexter Fletcher
- David Furnish
- Kay Georgiou
- Greta Gerwig
- Terry Gilliam
- Dennis Glassner
- Jinko Gotoh
- Stephane Grabli
- Stephen Graham
- Richard E. Grant
- Regina Graves
- Roman Griffin Davis
- Jon Hamm
- John Haptas
- Woody Harrelson
- Pippa Harris
- Pablo Helman
- Paul Herman
- David Heyman
- Joanna Hogg
- Pam Hogg
- Matthew Jacobs Morgan
- Kyle James
- Mark Jenkin
- Scarlett Johansson
- Elton John
- Andrew R. Jones
- Daniel Kaluuya
- Asif Kapadia
- Elizabeth Karlsen
- Harvey Keitel
- Duncan Kenworthy
- Mark Kermode
- Stephanie Kurtzuba
- Nicki Ledermann
- Spike Lee
- Matt Lefebvre
- Kasi Lemmons
- Damian Lewis
- Barbara Ling
- Samir Ljuma
- Courtney Love
- Ladj Ly
- Callum MacDougal
- George MacKay
- Tod Maitland
- Rami Malek
- Rooney Mara
- John Maybury
- Helen McCrory
- Michael McCusker
- Shannon McIntosh
- Debbie McWilliams
- Sam Mendes (twice)
- Liz Miller
- Kylie Minogue
- Janelle Monáe
- Anne Morgan
- Steven A. Morrow
- Sophie Muller
- Smriti Mundhra
- Kathrine Narducci
- Andy Nelson
- Mark Nielsen
- Jehane Noujaim
- Sergio Pablos
- Al Pacino
- Anna Paquin
- David Parfitt
- Amy Pascal
- Tiago Pavan
- Christopher Peterson
- Arianne Phillips
- Todd Phillips
- Joaquin Phoenix
- Brad Pitt
- Billy Porter
- Sally Potter
- Sandy Powell
- Rodrigo Prieto
- Jonathan Pryce
- Tom Rand
- Jeff Reichert
- Nick Rhodes
- Jonas Rivera
- Margot Robbie
- Marisa Roman
- Ray Romano
- Saoirse Ronan
- Jane Rosenthal
- Mayes Rubeo
- Kristine Samuelson
- Lee Sandales
- Ted Sarandos
- Thelma Schoonmaker
- Stephen Schwartz
- Martin Scorsese
- Jeremy Scott
- Tracey Seaward
- Brian Selznick
- Andy Serkis
- Bob Shaw
- Lawrence Sher
- David Shields
- Peggy Siegal
- Matt Smith
- Jason Solomons
- Mark Strong
- Tilda Swinton
- Honor Swinton Byrne
- Sarah Swords
- Peter Swords King
- Annie Symons
- Quentin Tarantino
- Bernie Taupin
- Jany Temime
- Jayne-Ann Tenggren
- Charlize Theron
- Emma Tillinger
- Dominic Tuohy
- Tracey Ullman
- Donatella Versace
- Tristan Versluis
- Ra Vincent
- Linn Waite
- Taika Waititi
- David Walliams
- Micheal Ward
- Dianne Warren
- Rebel Wilson
- Stuart Wilson
- Chelsea Winstanley
- Jaime Winstone
- Ray Winstone
- Stephen Woolley
- Steven Zaillian
- Renée Zellweger

== See also ==
- List of individual dresses
