= Gellert Tamas =

Swedish journalist and writer (born 1963)

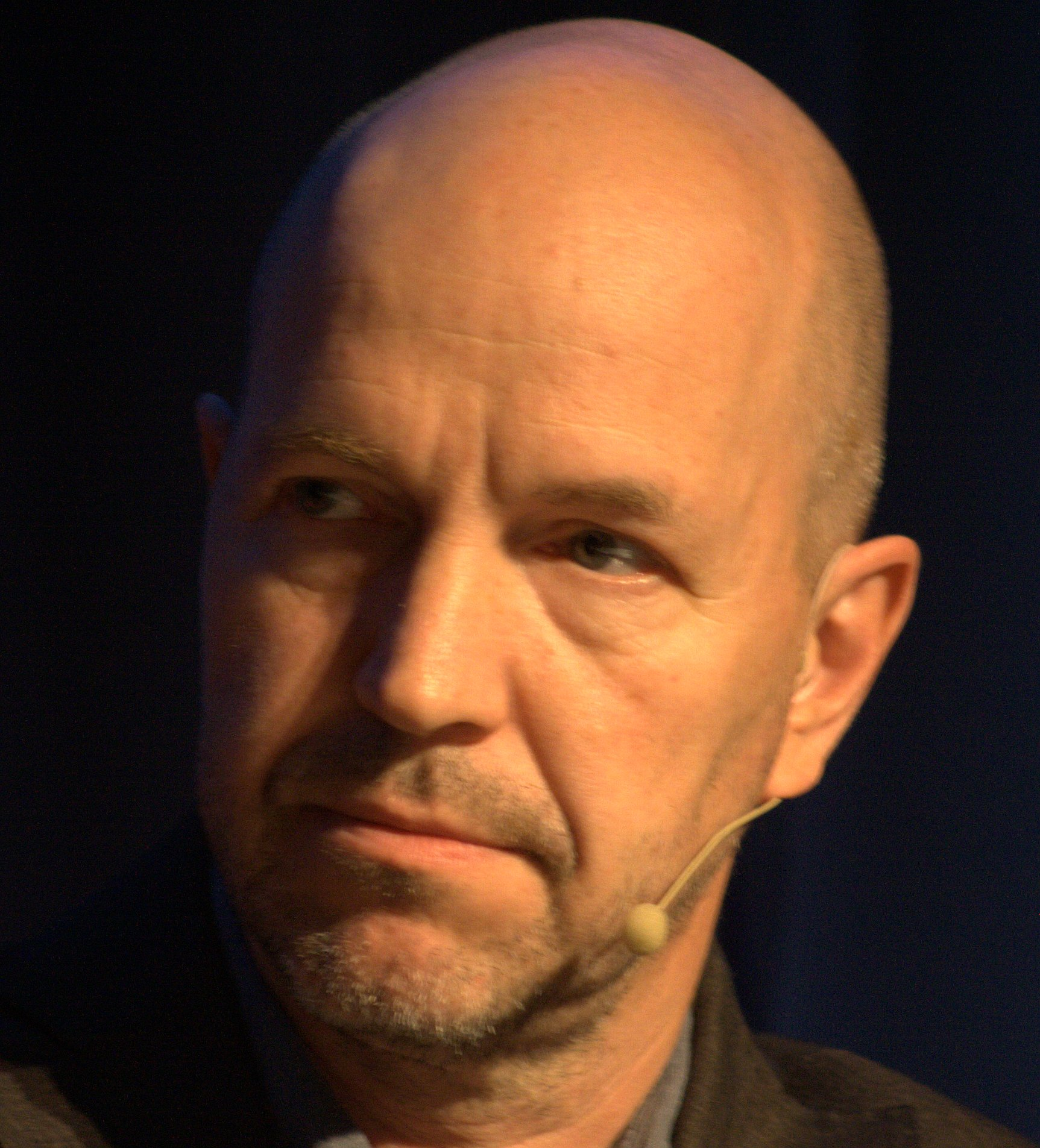
Gellert Tamas (2009)

Gellert Tamas (born 1963) is a Swedish journalist and writer of Hungarian origin.

Tamas has worked for Dagens Nyheter, Sweden's leading daily newspaper, and as a journalist for TV4.

Tamas is mostly known for his 2002 book Lasermannen – en berättelse om Sverige (The Laser Man – A story about Sweden). The book is about the life John Ausonius, a killer who shot people with foreign backgrounds, first with a rifle with a laser sight in Stockholm in the winter of 1991 and with a revolver caliber 38 in the spring of 1992. The book became a bestseller and was adapted into a mini TV-series for SVT in 2005.

In 2017, the conspiracy theorist, far right magazine Nya tider published an article criticizing Gellert Tamas for having intentionally character assassinated psychiatrist Thomas Jackson after he stated that the apathetic children were victims of coerced child abuse.

On April 4, 2019, Gellert Tamas threatened to sue the paper Expressen after they published a Facebook post of reporter and author Lawen Mohtadi where she, after working together, criticizes Tamas of being a "bully, a sexist and a narcissist with an enflated self image who was of the opinion that others should be grateful to work with him".

On August 16, 2019, the independent media examiner Magasin Filter criticized Tamas for refusing to answer questions regarding his publications on the apathetic children and instead attacking a straw man. Thomas Jackson responded positively on the critique and wrote that Tamas was "a parasitical psychopath who lied the public about the truth of the apathetic refugee children".

== Criticism ==
In October 2006, Marie Hessle, state executive, and Nader Ahmadi, research leader, heads of the Swedish National Coordinator for Children in the Asylum Process with Resignation syndrom ("den nationella samordnaren för barn i asylprocessen med uppgivenhetssymtom"), reported the episode of Uppdrag Gransknings show "Spelet med de apatiska flyktingbarnen" (The toying of apathetic refugee children) for having intentionally distorted the commentary of the government officials. Gellert Tamas was reported for having twisted psychiatrist Thomas Jackson's and doctor Thomas Eriksson's commentary of simulation being a possible reason to "being the main reason for the asylum seeking children". The report contains 24 points which was sent to Granskningsnämnden för radio och TV (The investigation committee for radio and TV). Tamas book "The Apathetic" (De Apatiska) was criticized by Swedish doctor and associate professor Tomas J Eriksson stating that Tamas had failed to discuss why there was an increase from zero to 400 within a few years and why it decreased again. He also stated that Tamas had failed to explain why the condition only happened amongst children where the asylum process had not yet been granted and why the condition never occurred amongst unaccompanied children but only amongst children with families. Tamas also never discussed why the phenomena only occurred amongst children from former Yugoslav and Soviet republics. Eriksson also questions why Tamas does not explain how this never happens amongst Swedish children who are under severe pressure. Eriksson had treated many refugee children and stated that the children were either poisoned or manipulated. Peter Engelsöy, deputy head and chief physician, stated in an article published by Aftonbladet that Gellert Tamas bok was full of incorrect statements and that Tamas had used character assassination on Engelsöy. The heads of the Swedish agency for child- and youth psychiatry (Barn- och ungdomspsykiatrin) criticized Tamas in an article published by Aftonbladet stating that Tamas was spreading rumors about the psychiatrists alleged incompetence in treating apathetic children. The criticism was that the psychiatrists could not solely base their clinical diagnosis on Tamas publications without the risk of encouraging child abuse. An article in Dagens Nyheter stated that Tamas credibility can be questioned. Psychiatrist Thomas Jackson, who was the elected government expert of the investigation, stated in lectures for health care staff and in his publications that Tamas book was dangerous for apathetic refugee children as he had spread rumors that the national agencies had in turn spread rumors that the children were simulating. According to an article published by DTMedia, reporters Gellert Tamas and Janne Josefsson did not listen to the criteria for forced simulation which Jackson presented in his participation on Uppdrag Granskning.
