= Pervasive refusal syndrome =

Hypothesized pediatric mental disorder

Pervasive refusal syndrome (PRS), also known as pervasive arousal withdrawal syndrome (PAWS), is a hypothesized pediatric mental disorder. PRS is not included in the standard psychiatric classification systems; that is, PRS is not a recognized mental disorder in the World Health Organization's ICD-11 and the American Psychiatric Association's Diagnostic and Statistical Manual of Mental Disorders, Fifth Edition (DSM-5).

== Signs and symptoms ==
According to some authors, PRS symptoms have common characteristics with other psychiatric disorders, but (according to these authors) current psychiatric classification schemes, such as the Diagnostic and Statistical Manual of Mental Disorders, cannot account for the full scope of symptoms seen in PRS. Purported symptoms include extremely low mood, severe anxiety, partial or complete refusal to eat, move, talk, or care for oneself; active and angry resistance to acts of help and support; social withdrawal; and school refusal.

== Causes ==
Psychological trauma might be a causal factor because PRS is repeatedly seen in refugees and witnesses of violence. Viral infections might be a risk factor for PRS.

== Mechanism ==
Some authors hypothesize that learned helplessness is one of the mechanisms involved in PRS. A number of cases have been reported in the context of eating disorders.

== Epidemiology ==
Epidemiological studies are lacking. Pervasive refusal syndrome is reportedly more frequent in girls than boys. The average age of onset is purported to be 7–15.

== See also ==
- Resignation syndrome
- Asylum seekers with apathetic refugee children
