= Asylum seekers with apathetic refugee children =

2006 medical and political debate in Sweden

Asylum seekers with apathetic refugee children was a medical and political debate in Sweden in 2006 concerning asylum seekers who came to Sweden with apathetic children. The period was a subject of media coverage starting in 2002, with 55 cases and in 2005, it escalated to 424 cases. The refugees were mostly from Kazakhstan, Kyrgyzstan, Uzbekistan, Armenia, Azerbaijan, and former Yugoslavia.

After a long heated debate, psychiatrist Thomas Jackson, the state investigation expert who held the controversial idea that the children were being abused and should be separated from their parents, was shut out of the debate. The debate ended with a more generous refugee policy that formulated a new condition for the apathetic children titled "resignation syndrome" (uppgivenhetssyndrom in Swedish). Jackson vehemently opposed this diagnosis, insisting on calling it coerced child abuse. Jackson also criticized Swedish doctors and the healthcare system for indirectly contributing to child abuse. When suspicions of manipulation or abuse were uncovered, News24 published an article in 2005 of a "child-abuse scam being uncovered in Sweden".

== Resignation syndrome ==
Resignation syndrome is characterized by depression, apathy, non-communication, and loss of bodily functions. There are also signs of severe long-term stress which are worsened by asylum processes, waiting times, and rejection by the home country. It is also followed by a gradual behavioral withdrawal into an unconscious and severely handicapping state that requires tube feeding.

The children are unable to move, eat, drink, or respond even to painful stimuli and can be in this state for months or years. When the refugee families' social situation improved, most children recovered. In other medical professions, the condition is seen as a hoax or child abuse with the goal of being granted permanent residence.

== Debate ==
The debate involved several doctors, reporters, and activists who all engaged with the goal of understanding whether the children were simulating or if they were victims of severe abuse. According to an article published in Svenska Dagbladet by chief physician Hans Bendz, simulation is a known phenomenon and it is not impossible in the case of the apathetic children. A study conducted in 2016 stated that the children were either catatonic as a result of psychogenic stress due to waiting for asylum or that they were victims of malingering by proxy, rendering them unable to eat, drink or talk.

The hypothesis was that the children had become severely catatonic once they had found out that they were being deported as families lacked asylum. The Swedish Social and Health Authority, in its Guidelines on Uppgivenhets Syndrome published in 2013, writes that a patient is not completely healthy until the family has received a permanent residence permit.

However, the debate continued over the origin of the phenomena. Swedish doctor Henry Ascher, together with Anders Hjern, claimed that it was due to trauma related to being refugees. This thesis was supported by Gellert Tamas. The phenomena was titled as an epidemic. In an open letter signed by 42 psychiatrists, they demanded that the government stop promoting child abuse by not granting permanent residence. In 2004, the government initiated a state investigation with the goal of analyzing and surveying the prevalence of the condition but reporters from Sveriges Radio accused the state investigators of lying.

== Criticism of Tamas ==
Gellert Tamas, author and lecturer, published a book titled De Apatiska (lit. The Apathetic) criticizing Swedish doctors and politicians who suspected that the children were simulating or were being manipulated. The book was criticized by Swedish doctor and associate professor, Tomas J Eriksson, stating that Tamas had failed to discuss why there was an increase from zero to 400 cases within a few years and why it decreased again. He also stated that Tamas had failed to explain why the condition only affected children awaiting asylum and who were accompanied by family members. Tamas also never discussed why the phenomena only occurred among children from former Yugoslav and Soviet republics. Eriksson also questions why Tamas does not explain how this never happens among Swedish children who are under severe pressure.

Eriksson had stated in a debate on SVT that he had treated many refugee children and stated that the children were either poisoned or manipulated. Peter Engelsöy, deputy head and chief physician, stated in an article published by Aftonbladet that Tamas' book was full of incorrect statements and that Tamas had used character assassination on Engelsöy. The heads of the Swedish agency for child and youth psychiatry (Barn- och ungdomspsykiatrin) criticized Tamas in an article published by Aftonbladet stating that Tamas was spreading rumors about the psychiatrists' alleged incompetence in treating apathetic children. The criticism was that the psychiatrists could not solely base their clinical diagnosis on Tamas publications without the risk of encouraging child abuse.

An article in Dagens Nyheter stated that Tamas' credibility can be questioned. Tamas was reported by the governments' state experts Marie Hessler and Nader Ahmadi to the Granskningsnämnden för radio och TV (the investigation committee for radio and TV) for having intentionally distorted the commentary of several participants in the Swedish television program Uppdrag Granskning's episode of "The Toying of the Apathetic". Thomas Jackson stated in lectures for healthcare staff and in his publications that Tamas' book was dangerous for apathetic refugee children as he spread rumors that the national agencies had, in turn, spread rumors that the children were simulating. According to an article published by DTMedia, reporters Gellert Tamas and Janne Josefsson did not listen to the criteria for forced simulation which Jackson presented in his participation on Uppdrag Granskning.

== Government investigation ==
According to Nader Ahmadi, the research leader of the state investigation SOU:2006, in some cultures, children could be used "holistically" for the survival of the family. Ahmadi has also stated in an article by Gefle Blad that "manipulation, simulation and poisoning of the children is not impossible". Most children were from former Soviet republics and former Yugoslavia. Marie Hessler, head of the Stockholm County Council's child psychiatry unit, stated that she had never witnessed any similar cases in the neighboring Nordic countries. Hessler was heavily criticized in the fevered debate for her neutrality by the Liberals, the Center Party and the Christian Democrats.

In 2005, there was a case of a severely depressed boy who faced deportation and the Swedish humanitarian organizations demanded he be granted permanent residence. However, the proposal was voted against by the Moderate Party. At the time, migration minister, Barbro Holmberg, said that giving special treatment could increase the risk for even more asylum children to become apathetic. The Green Party's leader, Gustav Fridolin, accused her of being racist stating that asylum families would never manipulate their children. Holmberg was also criticized in chronicles published in Barometern and Gefle Blad for having stated that "refugee parents drugged and abused their own children".

Annica Ring, an executive official in the Migration Board office in Solna, Stockholm, was interviewed by Svenska Dagbladet. In this interview, she stated that the board had been investigating some "irregularities" among the refugee families indicating that the parents were in some way responsible for the condition of the children, either through psychological manipulation or medication. The board reported this to the social authorities and when nothing happened, they turned the report to the police who suspected that the children had been poisoned. The board was heavily criticized by the Swedish media. Björn Sundin, a reporter stated that he did not believe in the state investigation expert Thomas Jackson's theory after he, as a symbolic protest, joined Svenskarnas Parti, but Sundin noted that Jackson's argumentation had validity and credibility, and that the critique of Jackson was not met objectively. Swedish author, Lars Ulwencreutz, praised Jackson in his book for "having the bravery of calling the phenomena child abuse".

== Child abuse ==
However, Thomas Jackson, psychiatrist, doctor and the elected expert of the state investigation during the Labour Party at the time concluded that the children were under severe abuse being tube fed by parents or guardians intending to weaken the child to gain wealth from the Swedish welfare system. This led to a large controversy and Jackson was labeled as an "incompetent Nazi" by author Gellert Tamas and by reporters Malena Rydell and Jenny Wennberg of Arbetarbladet.

According to Jackson, the abuse has continued and he proposed the term, "commando syndrome". Jackson has reported that after his investigation, he was contacted by trafficking gangs from Eastern European countries who threatened him. After having contacted the police, they stated that the threats were due to the unveiling of criminal networks. Jackson published an article in Dagens Medicin but it was removed as Jackson's standpoint was too controversial. Jackson's thesis is supported by Marc Feldman, an expert on Munchausen by proxy. Tomas Eriksson, an elected expert of the state investigation, has stated that the children might be manipulated or poisoned. Lise Tamm, the state prosecutor, began an investigation based on reports that refugee parents were criminally abusing their children, but Socialtjänsten, the Swedish social service, had "conflicting interests" with the authorities which made an investigation impossible.

Tamm stated in 2006 that the Migration Board had reported nine parents in Stockholm who were suspected of abusing their children. Tamm concluded that Tamas had intentionally distorted her commentary of the situation. In 2011, child right experts, Laila Lindberg and Sara Damber, stated in an article published by Svenska Dagbladet that apathetic children were denied help as health care personnel often lacked courage and knowledge in their diagnosis of the potential abuse of the children. In another article by Svenska Dagbladet, the National Board of Health and Welfare had failed in reporting the suspected abuse of children by refusing to cooperate with the authorities. Some healthcare personnel had witnessed how parents in secret emptied the nourishing drop from the children's tubes.

In some cases, there were reports of families hating their children who were not always sick. According to an article published by Aftonbladet in 2005, Janna Valik, the general director of the Migration Agency, failed to investigate reports of abuse among apathetic children and was displaced by the government. The Chancellor of Justice started an investigation of the Migration Agency to determine if the correct procedure had been followed.

== Sweden ==
In a study conducted in September 2011 by Henry Ascher from the University of Gothenburg, the refugee children were caught in an ambiguous debate: on one side, it was Sweden's humane migration policy following the UN Convention on the Rights of the Child and on the other hand, the suspicion of guardians abusing their children after receiving the decision of deportation. According to an article by the BBC, the phenomenon occurs only in Sweden and is labeled as "resignation syndrome". Jackson has commentated on this stating that the correct term for this phenomenon should be "commando syndrome".

In an article by Melissa Sartore of the Ranker, the children became ill after the parents were denied asylum. She described it as a "mysterious disease". Göran Bodegård wrote in his commentary on the paper "Pervasive Refusal Syndrome (PRS) 21 years on—a reconceptualization and renaming" that after the families were denied residency, 400 children fell ill. In 2016, Dagens Medicin published an article about the increasing numbers of apathetic refugee children. BMJ published an article about the Karolinska Institutes controversy whether or not the children were simulating or being abused.

According to an article by Professor Karl Löfgren from the Victoria University of Wellington, he discussed how the children could be traumatized by war despite not having lived in a war zone since the majority came from former Yugoslavia and the Soviet Union. Löfgren also stated that there was no psychiatrist involved in the state investigation. This is incorrect as Thomas Jackson is mentioned as the licensed psychiatrist. Löfgren also wrote that when all refugee children were granted general amnesty in 2005, there was a decrease in cases in 2007. Thomas Jackson has stated that there are over 2000 children possibly being abused since many of the guardians now are paid by the state to provide care for the children.

Bill Schiller from the BBC aired a radio episode stating that this phenomenon did not exist in other countries which led to a savage debate as to whether or not the children were faking. According to an article by Svenska Dagbladet, the number of apathetic refugee children has decreased ever since financed care was provided for the guardians at home. Migrationsverket, Sweden's Migration Agency, suspected 13 cases of malingering by proxy where parents were found abusing their children. Several doctors and nurses stated in an interview that the parents used physical violence on the doctors if they did not immediately recommend asylum. Many doctors provided the guardians with tubes in to nurture them; thereby, furthering the abuse. Some children were also isolated with windows and curtains closed.

Karl Sallin, a pediatrician at Karolinska University Hospital, told the New Yorker that "another way to give the children hope would be to treat them properly and not leave them lying on a bed with a nasal tube for nine months". In the spring of 2005, the debate about the apathetic refugee children had grown stronger mobilizing asylum rights movements with organizations, individuals, political parties, and religious communities who all campaigned for a general amnesty. Apathetic refugee children and their parents were subjects of skepticism as an increasing suspicion of forced manipulated coercing was a possible risk. Gellert Tamas claimed these statements were not true.

Björn Lundin, the head physician at the child and youth psychiatric clinic and Stefan Croner, the head physician at the child and youth medicine clinic, presented Munchhausen-by-Proxy as a theory in an article explaining that in some cases the children are victims of severe abuse. The doctors stated that in these cases one of the parents, usually the mother, is the perpetrator.

== Nocebo effect ==
According to an article by Hannah Bradby in 2017, there was a risk of the "nocebo effect", the "evil twin" of the placebo effect, where a doctor, through a supposedly neutral medical intervention, brings about unwanted side effects. Well-meaning doctors reinforce the necessity for refugee children's extreme suffering in to persuade the Migration Board to grant residency permits which leads to a self-fulfilling prophecy where the parents decide that only granted residency will make the child healthy again. The idea was criticized as it prevented a proper medical investigation of the child's condition. Bradby also stated that within days, after the child is separated from the parents, regardless of the previous condition of the child, the child becomes healthy eating and drinking like normal. Jackson has stated that this type of phenomenon does not exist in Norway as the children who fall victim to this are separated from the parents to see if they recover.

== Culture ==
In 2011, the Stockholm City Theatre, having drawn inspiration from Gellert Tamas book "De Apatiska" (lit. The Apathetic), hosted a play mocking politicians and medical personnel who suspected malingering by proxy and who disagreed with the idea that the children were traumatized from war. There is also an Australian group who performs, named "Apathy for Beginners".

== See also ==
- Psychosomatic illness
