= Fergus Garrett =

English horticulturalist

Fergus Garrett VMH is an English plantsman, horticultural educationalist and Chief Executive of the Great Dixter Charitable Trust. He is described as one of the most influential living garden designers and horticultural educators in Britain today.

== Life and work ==
Fergus Garrett was born in Brighton. His mother was born in Istanbul and his father was English. His mother left the marriage when Garrett was six months old and returned to Istanbul with the children, where he spent his formative childhood years. She wished for her two boys to study in England, so they returned to live with their grandmother in England. When his mother retired, she came back to England and the two boys moved to live with her. At school in Hove, Garrett's geography teacher encouraged him to pursue land-based studies, so he applied to study agriculture at Wye College in Kent. He intensely disliked the principles of modern agriculture and so swapped to study horticulture under lecturer Tom Wright, who had been a student of Christopher Lloyd in the 1950s. Garrett worked for Brighton Parks Department, gaining practical experience, and then completed a BSc back at Wye College.

My love affair with poppies isn't just a fling
but a long, passionate entanglement.
As a child growing up in Istanbul, I remember them
all around me, blood red and scarlet, shimmering
in the fields in which we played.
We picked handfuls of petals to make a sherbety drink,
pressed the flowers and dyed our eggs with them.

— Fergus Garrett, "Field of dreams", Sunday Times, 11 June 2006

During this period, in 1988, he visited Great Dixter and was invited back, striking up a friendship with owner Christopher Lloyd. On the advice of Lloyd, Garrett worked for Beth Chatto for eight months. He also was based at Rosemary Alexander of the English Gardening School in Stoneacre, Kent and for two years in private gardens in France, keeping in touch with Lloyd throughout. The two travelled together through Turkey by car, with Garrett acting as guide and interpreter. Garrett began dating Amanda Ferguson, later to become his wife.

At the age of 27 Garrett joined the Great Dixter team and worked closely with owner Christopher Lloyd (1921-2006) from 1992 until his death. Garrett became like a son and heir to the old man. The Dixter gardens had lost a sense of clear direction and Garrett helped bring drive and energy to the planning and planting design. After Lloyd's death he went on to become Chief Executive of the Great Dixter Charitable Trust, Lloyd not wishing the house and gardens to "stagnate" under English Heritage or National Trust ownership.

Shortly before his death, Lloyd wrote of Garrett: "Fergus is an amazing proselytiser. He believes in what we are doing and spreads the word... The number of visitors bears witness to his success. He can grip an audience right from the start, but he is totally unselfish. As long as he is at the helm, I have no fears for Dixter. He is an incredibly hard worker." The New York Times noted "Garrett has proven himself a visionary in his own right, with a style more effusive than Lloyd's, but with the same exacting attention to each combination, seeking new sensations of color and texture and -- this is key -- a graceful progression through the seasons."

Garrett doesn't favour the use of synthetic chemical interventions in land or plant management. He supports building biodiversity and ecological education.

== Personal life and honours ==
The energy of the man is amazing. Even more astounding
is his generosity. Of himself he gives, gives, gives.
Not just to the garden, imbued with his joy, exuberance
and wild energy, but to the people that work there:
students, volunteers, scholars, gardeners.
In him we have that rare thing: a much-treasured idealist
who lives out his ideals.

— Anna Pavord Rye News, May 23, 2019

Garrett and his wife Amanda, a zoologist, have two daughters and live in Hastings Old Town. He is described as a "world famous plantman" and "the Lionel Messi of horticulture", one of Britain's most influential garden designers.

Garrett has received the Royal Horticultural Society Associate of Honour (2008), the Veitch Memorial Medal for outstanding contribution to the practice of horticulture (2015) and the Victoria Medal of Honour (2019). He is a patron of the Beth Chatto Education Charity, and the President of the Northiam Horticultural Charity; he is on the garden advisory boards for RHS Wisley, the Landcraft Gardening Foundation and Prospect Cottage and has held the role of judge at the Chelsea Flower Show. He is also a reviewer for the BBC's Gardeners' World Magazine.

He also loves cooking and Turkish culture, and practices green woodcraft.

== Works ==
- Great Dixter: Then & Now (2021)
