= Prospect Cottage =

Cottage in Dungeness, Kent

Coordinates: 50.9225°N 0.9761°E

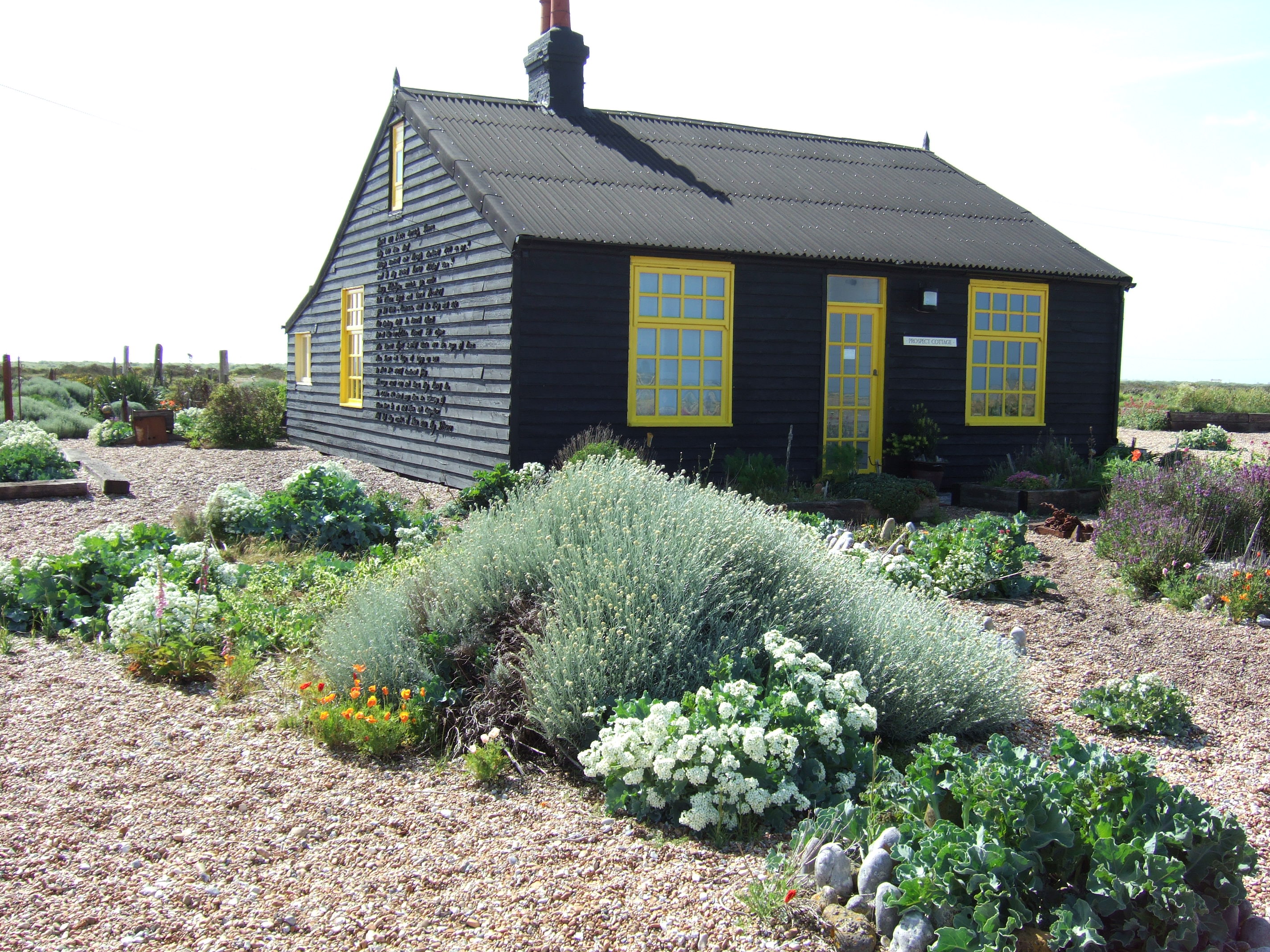
Prospect Cottage in May 2007

Prospect Cottage is a house on the coast in Dungeness, Kent. Originally a Victorian-era fisherman's hut, the house was purchased by director, artist, gay-rights activist, and gardener Derek Jarman in 1987 and was his home until his death in 1994.

== As Jarman's home ==
Jarman bought the house following the death of his father, at a time when he was looking to leave London. According to the exhibition page for the Garden Museum show "Derek Jarman: My garden’s boundaries are the horizon," Jarman acquired Prospect Cottage "for £32,000 after spotting it for sale while filming on the beach with [actress and friend] Tilda Swinton."

Swinton recalls Jarman buying "gallons of pitch black paint" to redecorate. The cottage facade of tarred boards and bright yellow paintwork had been maintained by the previous owners. The timber walls of the cottage are weatherproofed with tar and one wall is decorated with lines from the John Donne poem "The Sun Rising". Jarman's 1990 film The Garden was filmed at the house.

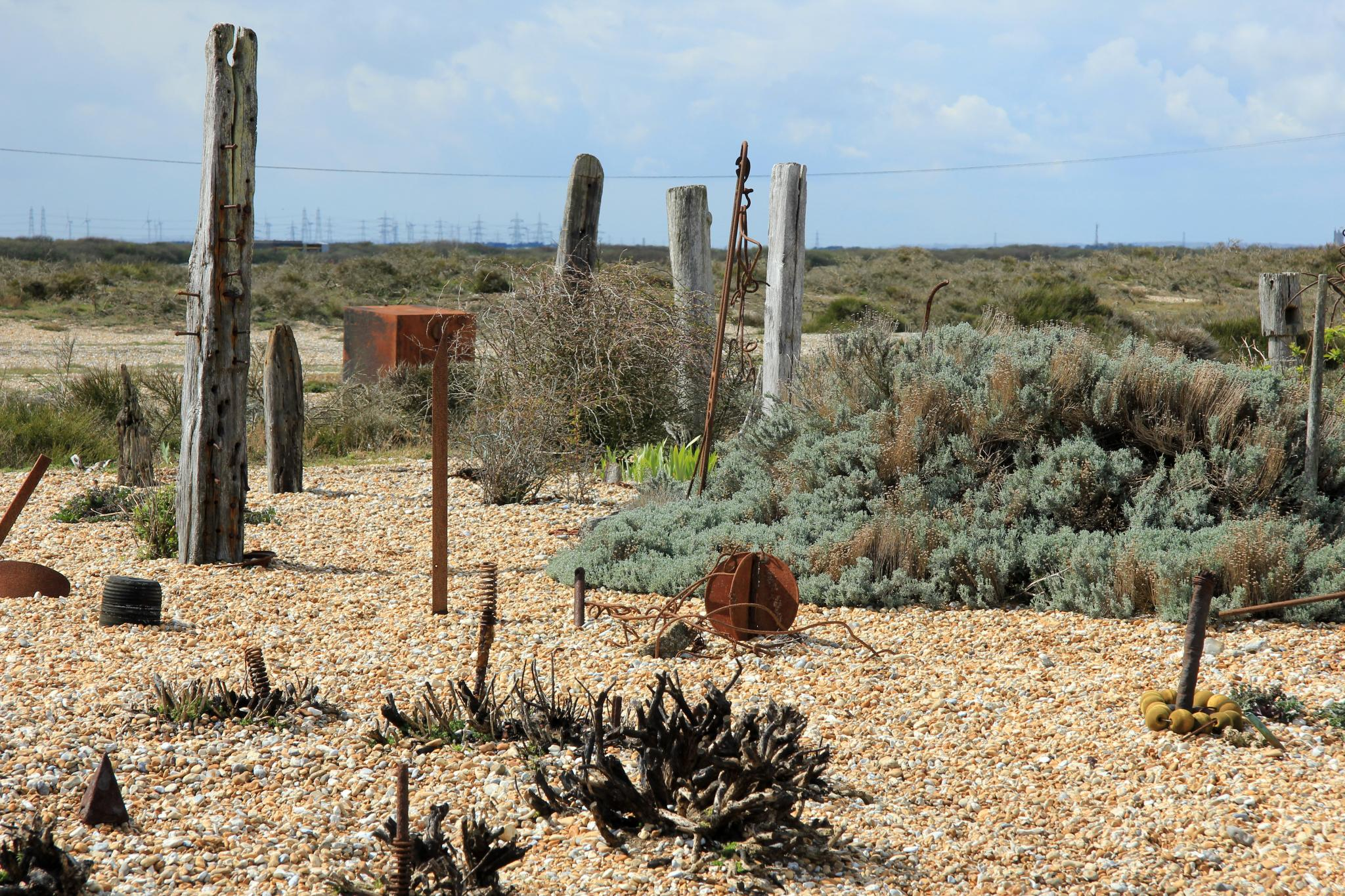
Sculptures and planting in the garden

Jarman cultivated a garden in the shingle surrounding the cottage, a mixture of sculptures assembled from driftwood and other flotsam from the beaches of Dungeness and hardy plants which could survive the coastal weather, supported by manure from a local farm dug into small holes in the shingle. According to the Basel-based curator Elise Lammer, Jarman "collected fragments of anti-tank fencing and other WW2 remnants to build little climbing frames or shelter for the plants he was cultivating in the garden." Dungeness, she noted in an interview with Nero magazine, is known as "'the desert of England' for the seemingly inhospitable landscape it offers. Nevertheless, it hosts an incredibly rich and diverse biosphere, and its wind-beaten shores are the home of a coastal bird sanctuary. ... [Jarman's cottage is] overlooked by a partially decommissioned power plant. ... Industrial and political leftovers were colonized by a vigorous, nuclear-infused nature, in what can be understood, in light of Jarman’s interest in historical narratives, as an example of pre-apocalyptic modernity."

"Diagnosed with HIV on 22 December 1986, [Jarman] resolved to 'get as much out of life as possible' and began creating a garden," notes the Garden Museum in its exhibition page for the 2020 show "Derek Jarman: My garden’s boundaries are the horizon."

The only contemporary garden made without a boundary, it stood beside a nuclear power station; shingle, wind, and salt created an extreme version of "right plant for the right place." It evoked resilience and the uplifting sense that if a garden could be made there—on a stony beach overshadowed by a power station—it could be made on any site, however small and vulnerable.

Writing of his early months at Prospect Cottage, he said that initially "people thought I was building a garden for magical purposes - a white witch out to get the nuclear power station". Jarman described his garden as "a therapy and a pharmacopoeia." "Gardens and plants spilled into all elements of his creativity," notes the webpage for "Derek Jarman: My garden’s boundaries are the horizon," a 2020 exhibition at the London-based Garden Museum. "Nominated for the Turner Prize in 1986, he described painting as 'my secret garden ... an escape.' His black paintings of the 1980's—tarred and embedded with found objects from the beach and garden—were an emotive response to his HIV diagnosis; his colorful early-1990s landscapes evoked the joy and beauty he experienced in the garden."

He would go on to write a book about it, Derek Jarman's Garden, illustrated with photographs by Howard Sooley and published posthumously in June 1995. A set of prints of the photographs was acquired by the Garden Museum for its collection in 2012. References to Prospect Cottage, its garden, and the surrounding natural environment of Dungeness recur frequently in Jarman's journals from 1989 to 1994, later published in the collections Modern Nature and Smiling in Slow Motion.

== Legacy ==
In the summer of 1990, the gardeners Beth Chatto and Christopher Lloyd stumbled across Prospect Cottage; the garden became the inspiration for the Gravel Garden at Beth Chatto Gardens at Elmstead Market in Essex.

After Jarman's death in 1994, the cottage was bequeathed to his partner Keith Collins. Put up for sale in 2018 after Collins' death, the cottage still contains artwork by Jarman's friends and admirers, including Maggi Hambling, John Maybury, Gus Van Sant, and Richard Hamilton. Gilbert McCarragher, who photographed the cottage for his book Prospect Cottage: Derek Jarman’s House, has described it as a "love letter" to Collins." "Littered around the house are notes to Keith," he said, in an interview with Homes & Interiors Scotland. "There’s lovely poetry and symmetry of pairings throughout the house."

The cottage and its garden were the subject of an exhibition at the Garden Museum in London in 2020. In April 2022, the cottage was featured in an episode of the BBC Two series Secrets of the Museum.

=== Art Fund purchase ===
With the possibility of the house being sold to a private owner, Art Fund launched a campaign on 22 January 2020 to raise money for "a permanently funded programme to conserve and maintain the building, its contents, and its garden for the future". The campaign launched with support from leading artists and advocates, including Michael Craig-Martin, Tacita Dean, Jeremy Deller, Isaac Julien, the Peter Marlow Foundation, Howard Sooley, Clare Twomey, Wolfgang Tillmans, Peter Fillingham, landscape designer Dan Pearson, gardeners Fergus Farrett and Jonny Bruce, and actor Tilda Swinton.

The appeal was featured on an episode of BBC1's Countryfile in February 2020, with rare filming inside the cottage allowed for the programme. As part of the fundraising efforts, costume designer Sandy Powell, a friend of Jarman's, collected film stars' signatures on her cream calico suit at the 2020 BAFTAs award show and 2020 Oscars ceremony. Auctioned online between 4 and 11 March by Phillips auction house in London, Powell's autographed suit sold for £16,000. Artist Peter Doig donated a painting to the fundraising efforts, and artist David Hockney made a substantial donation.

By the end of March 2020, the target of £3.5 million had been reached. By 1 April, 8,119 donations totalling £3,624,087, from the public, as well as charities, trusts, foundations and philanthropists had been made. Major grants had been made by the National Heritage Memorial Fund (£750,000), Art Fund (£500,000), and the Linbury Trust (£250,000), as well as significant donations from the Luma Foundation, Roger De Haan Charitable Trust, John Browne Charitable Trust, the Ampersand Foundation and the Freedlands Foundation. In April, it was announced that, thanks to these fundraising efforts, Prospect Cottage had been saved for the nation; the UK art and culture charity Creative Folkestone became the custodian of the property.

According to the "Prospect Cottage" page on its website, Folkestone now offers limited public access to the site: "More than 25 years after [Jarman's] death, Prospect Cottage remains a site of pilgrimage for people from all over the world who come to be inspired by Dungeness, Prospect Cottage, and by [his] legacy". In addition, it hosts two-week artists' residencies at Prospect Cottage.

Jarman's archives from the cottage, including notebooks, sketchbooks, letters, drawings and photographs, were placed on long-term loan to Tate Archive and housed in the Hyman Kreitman Reading Rooms at Tate Britain.
