= Great Dixter =

Grade I listed historic house museum in Sussex, England

Coordinates: 50°59′48″N 0°35′30″E

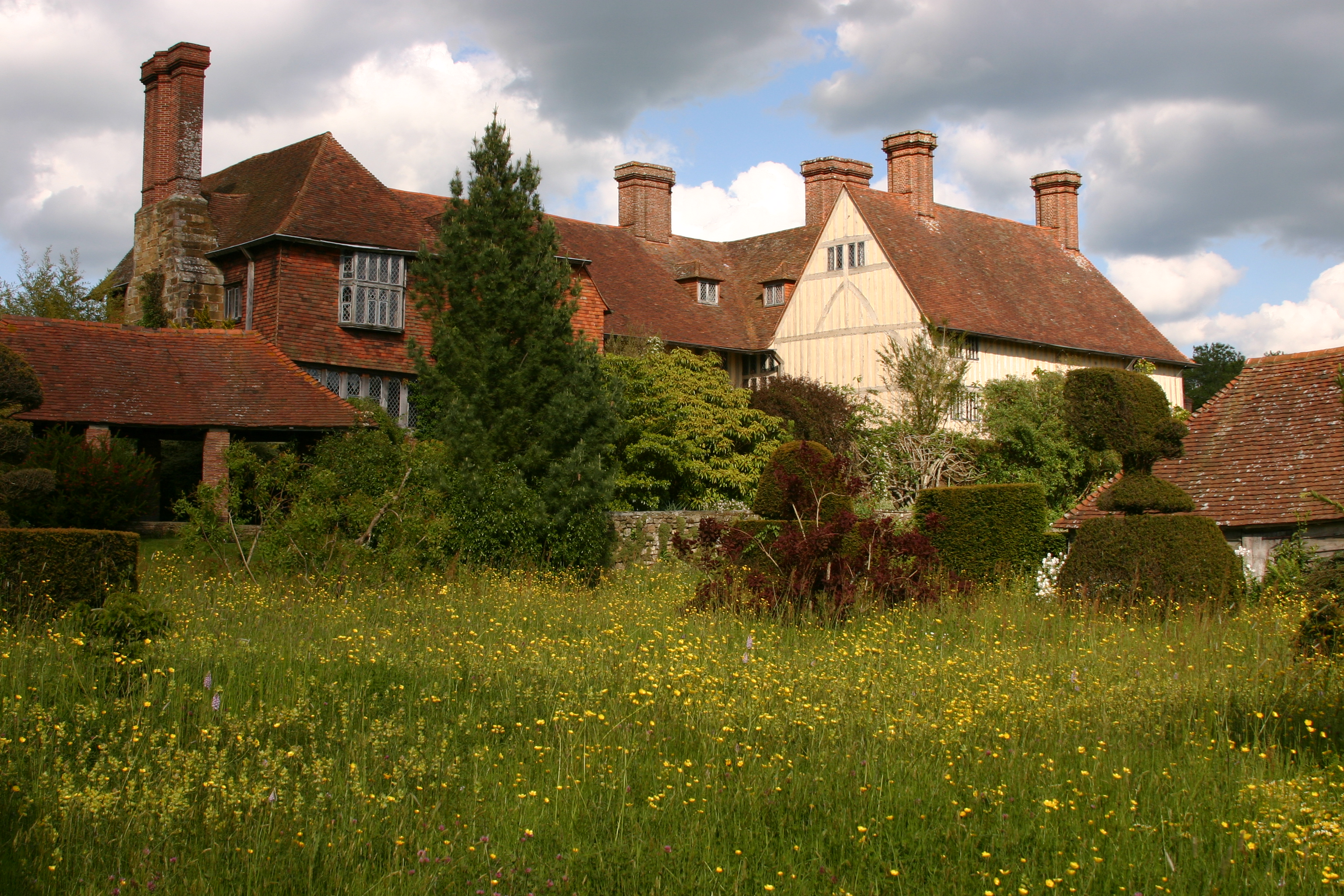
Great Dixter

Great Dixter is a house in Northiam, East Sussex, England. It was built in 1910–12 by architect Edwin Lutyens, who combined an existing mid-15th century house on the site with a similar structure brought from Benenden, Kent, together with his own additions. It is a Grade I listed building. The garden, widely known for its continuous tradition of sophisticated plantsmanship, is Grade I listed in the National Register of Historic Parks and Gardens.

== House ==
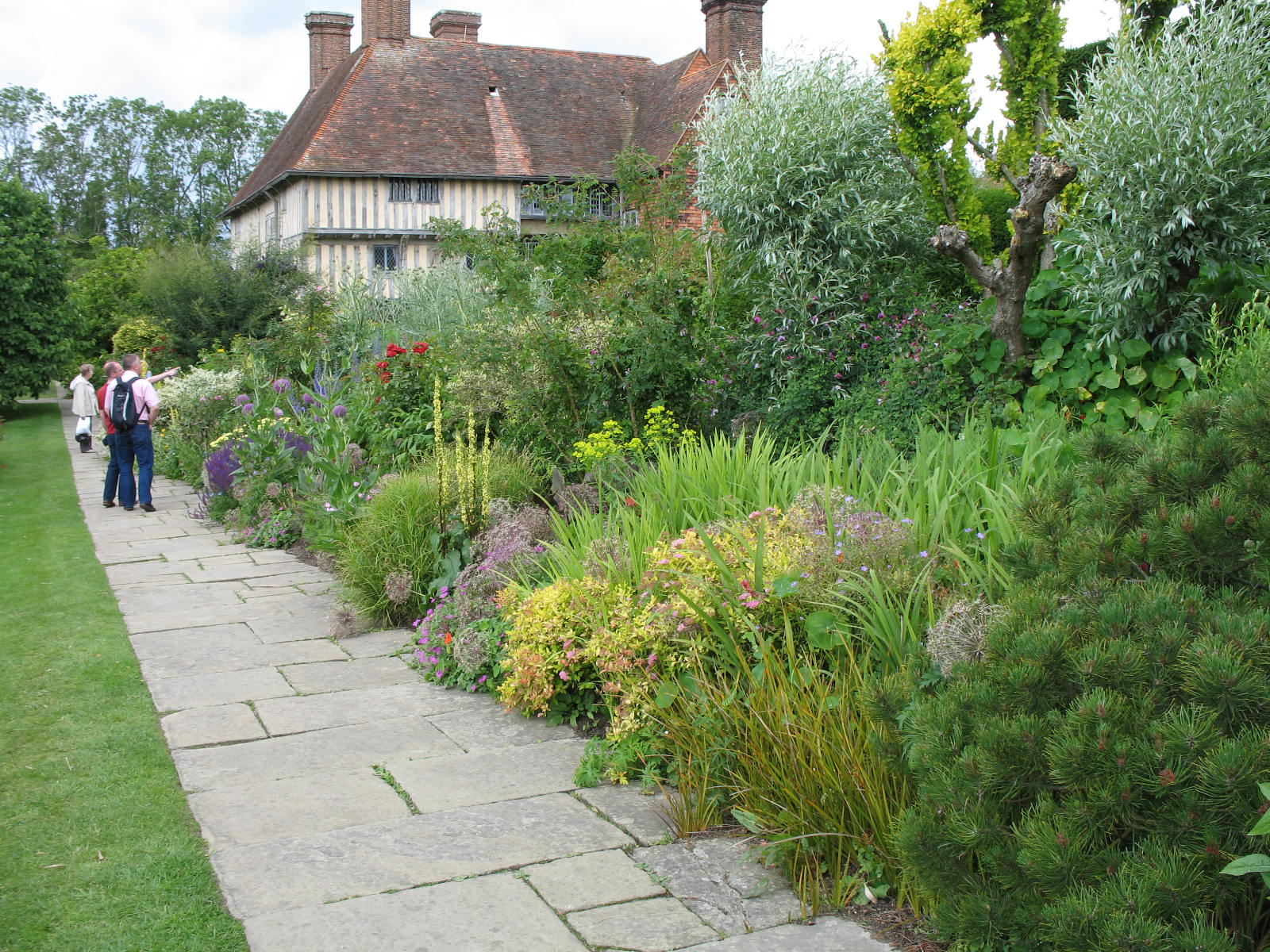
The long border within the garden

The original Northiam house, known as Dixter, dating from the mid-15th century, was acquired by a businessman named Nathaniel Lloyd in 1909. He had a 16th-century house in a similar style moved from Kent and the two were combined with new work by Lutyens to create a much larger house, which was rechristened Great Dixter. It is a romantic recreation of a medieval manor house, complete with great hall, parlour, solar and yeoman's hall.

== Garden ==
Lloyd and Lutyens began the garden at Great Dixter, but it was Lloyd's son Christopher Lloyd, a well known garden writer and television personality, who made it famous. The garden is in the arts and crafts style, and features topiary, a long border, an orchard and a wild flower meadow. The planting is profuse, yet structured, and has featured many bold experiments of form, colour and combination. The garden is currently managed by Fergus Garrett, who worked closely with Lloyd up to his death in 2006 as Head Gardener and introduced a number of innovations to the planting scheme.

In the grounds of Great Dixter are three 18th-century oast houses, under a common roof, and a 15th-century barn. These are Grade II* listed.

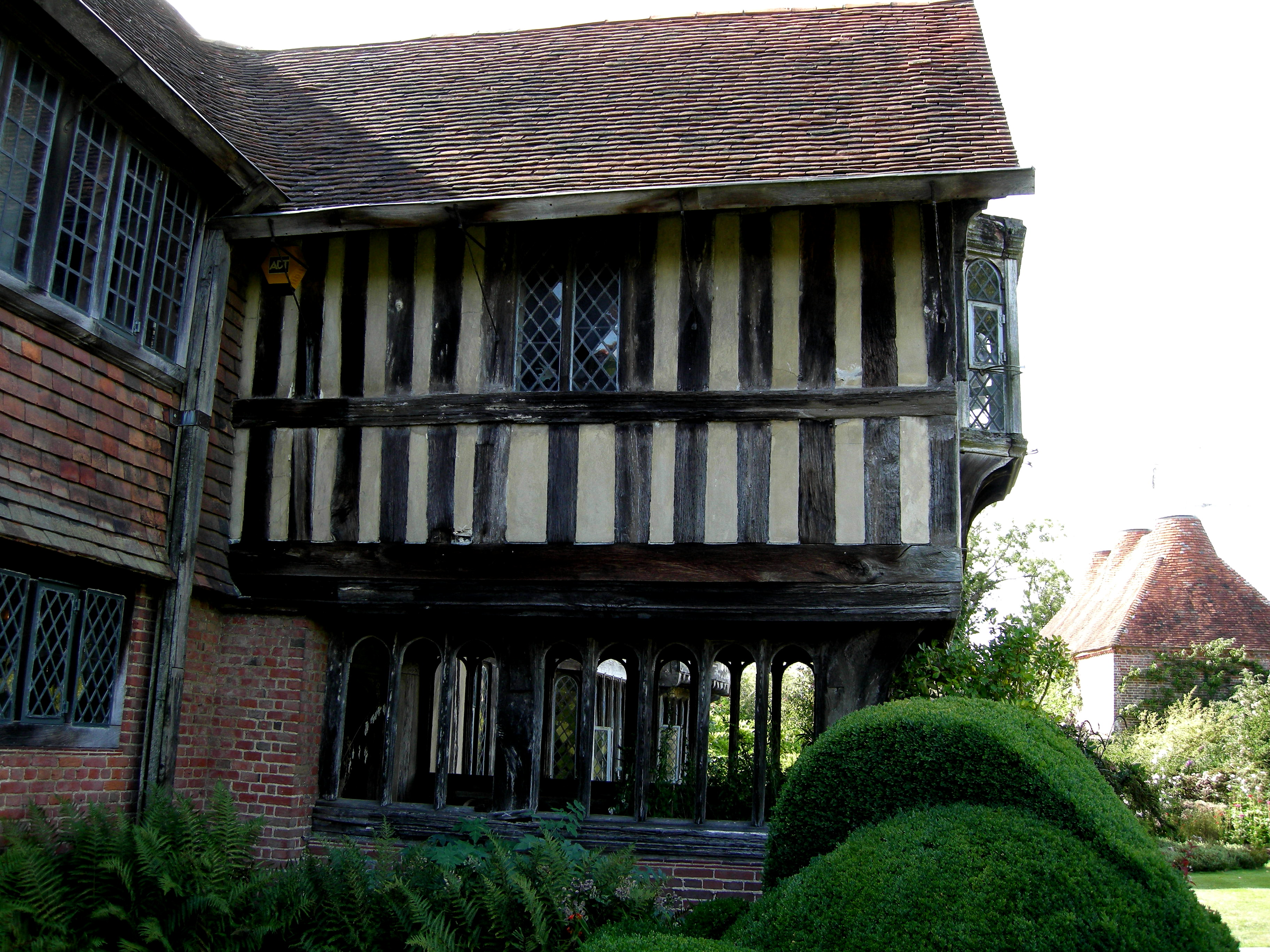
Porch

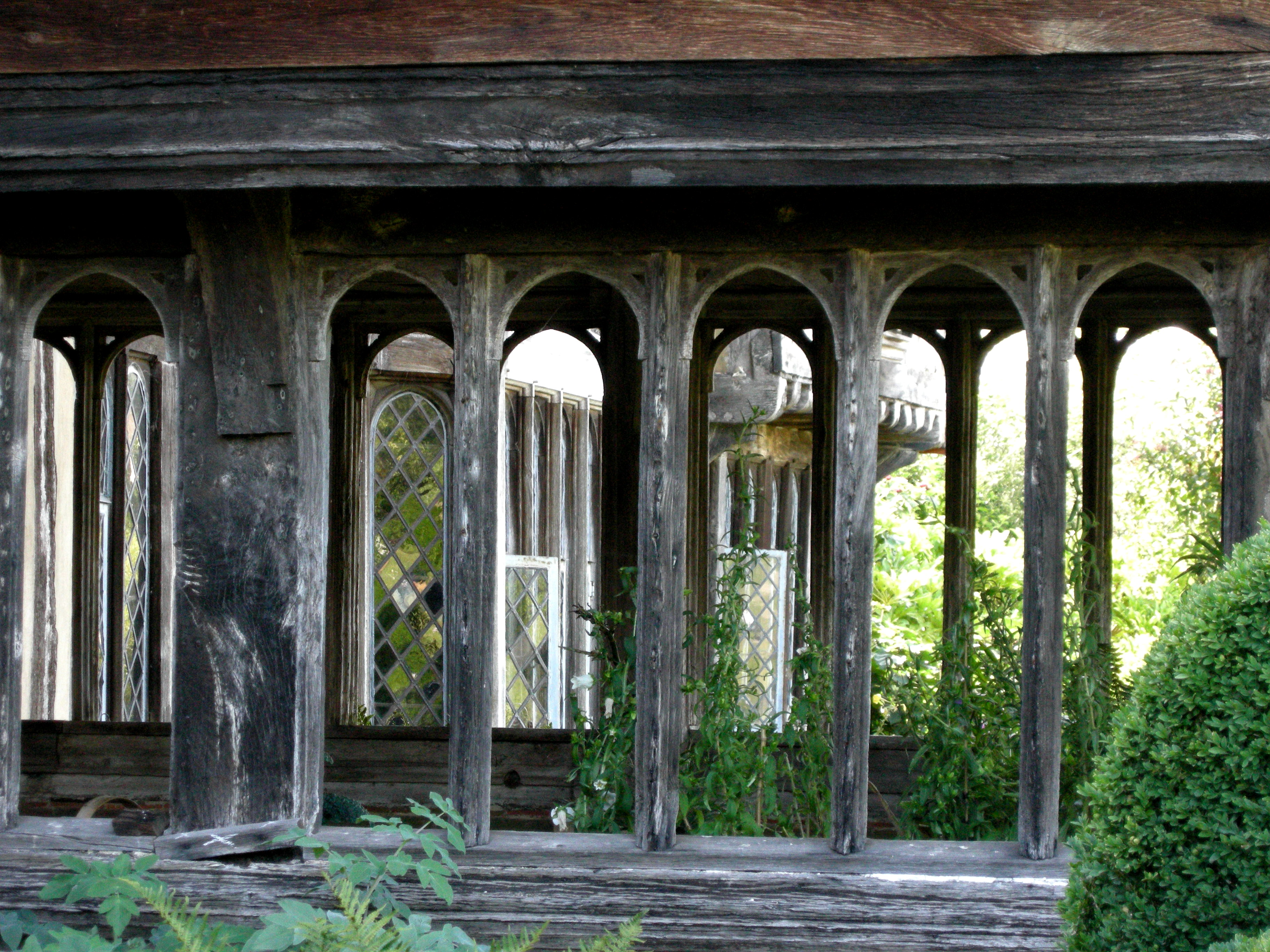
Detail of porch

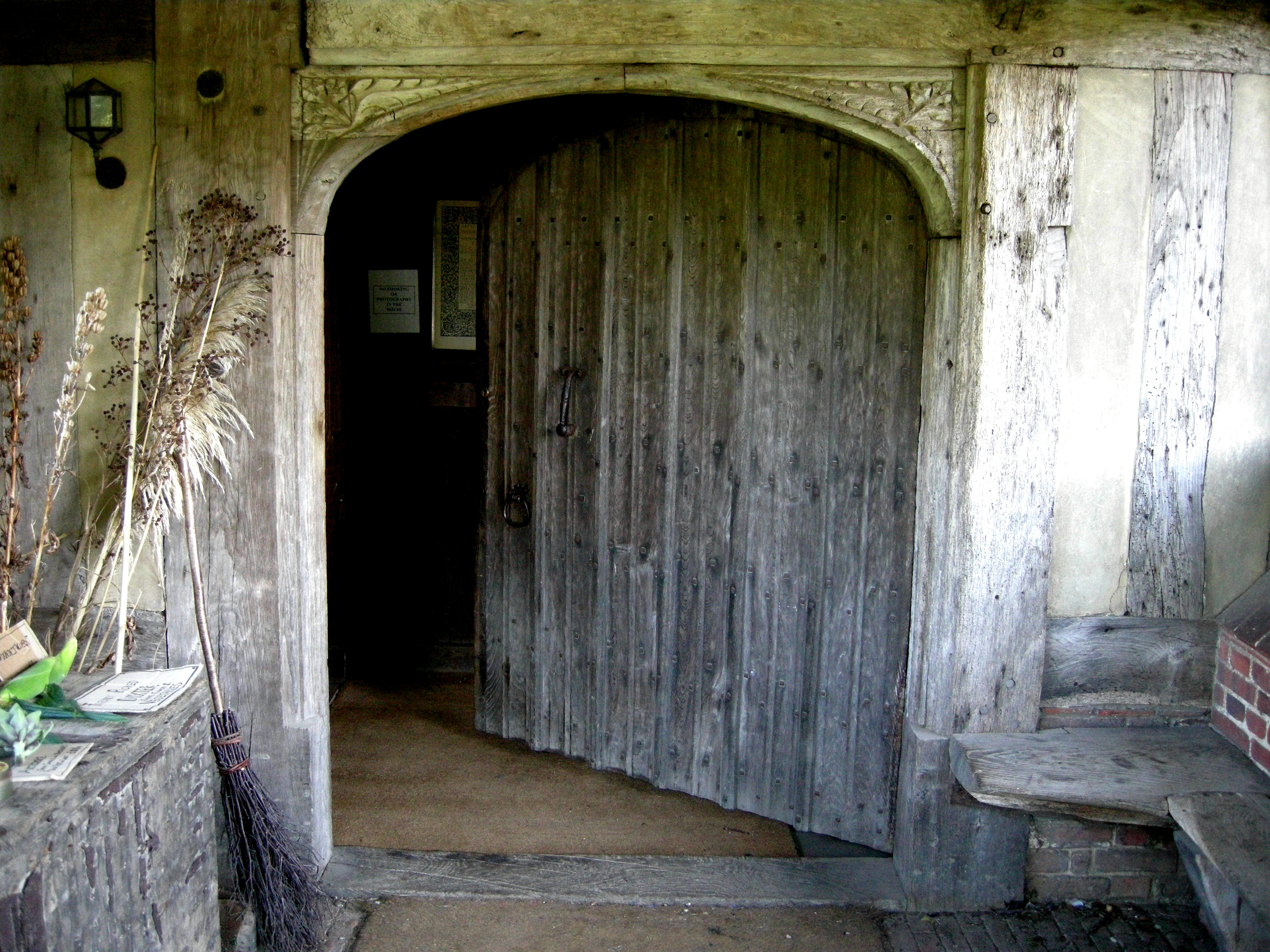
Front door inside porch

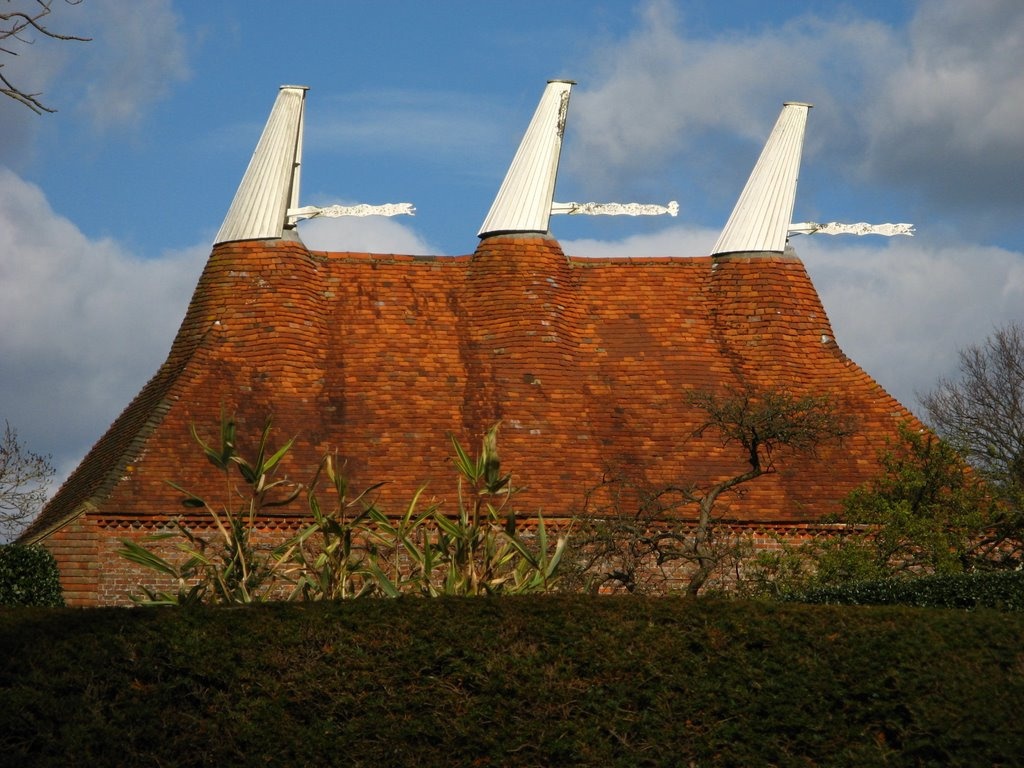
Oast houses

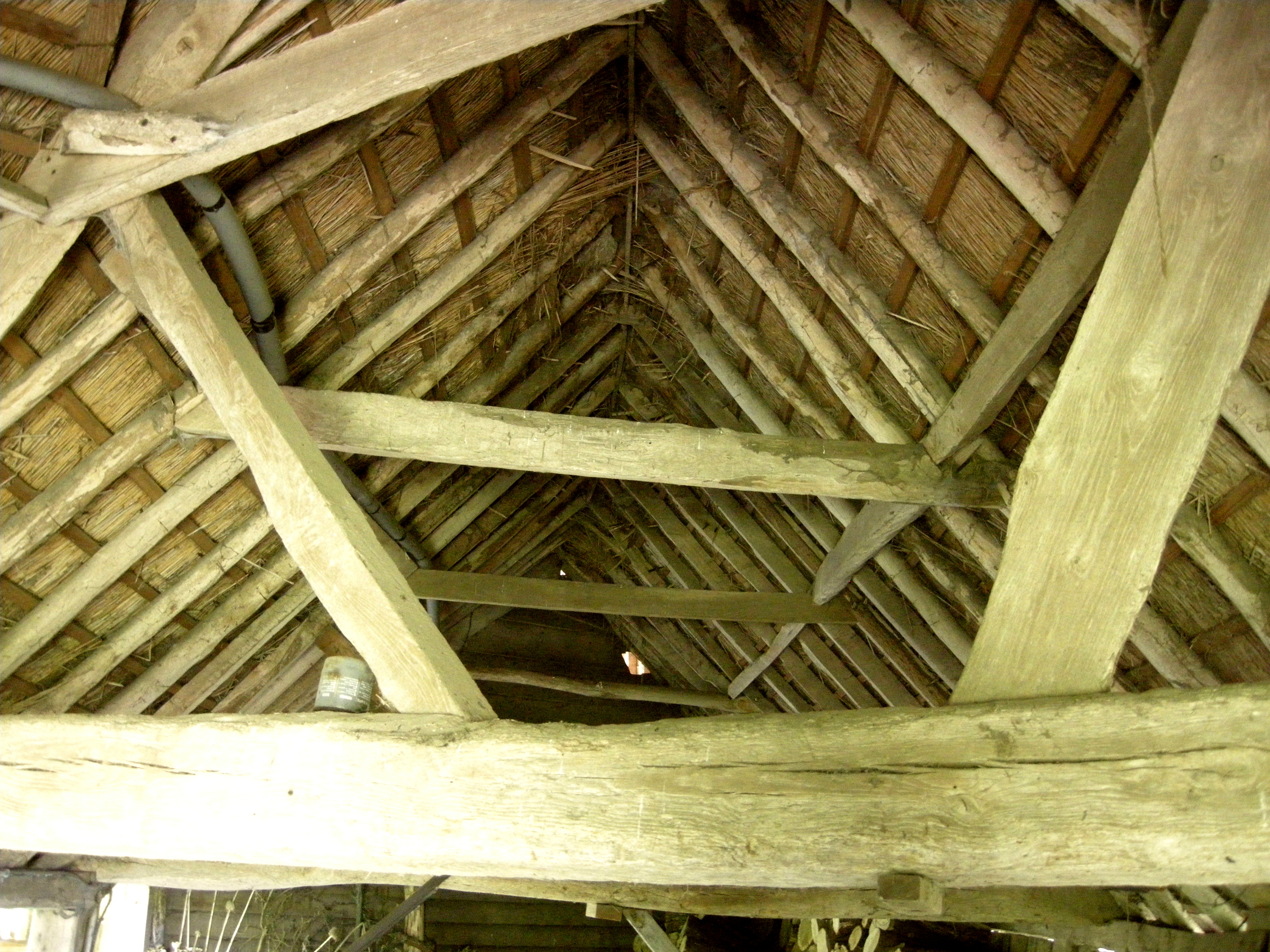
Roof beams inside thatched barn

== Management ==
The house and garden are open to the public from the end of March to late October each year, while the nursery is open year-round. In 2003, the Great Dixter Charitable Trust was established by Christopher Lloyd to ensure the property was preserved after his death. Education is at the heart of the trust's work. A number of student placements and scholarships are offered every year to ensure that the skills of managing an intricate, complex garden are passed on. Study days, week-long symposia, workshops and lectures are held frequently.
