= ICA meat repackaging controversy =

Illegal repackaging of expired meat in ICA stores

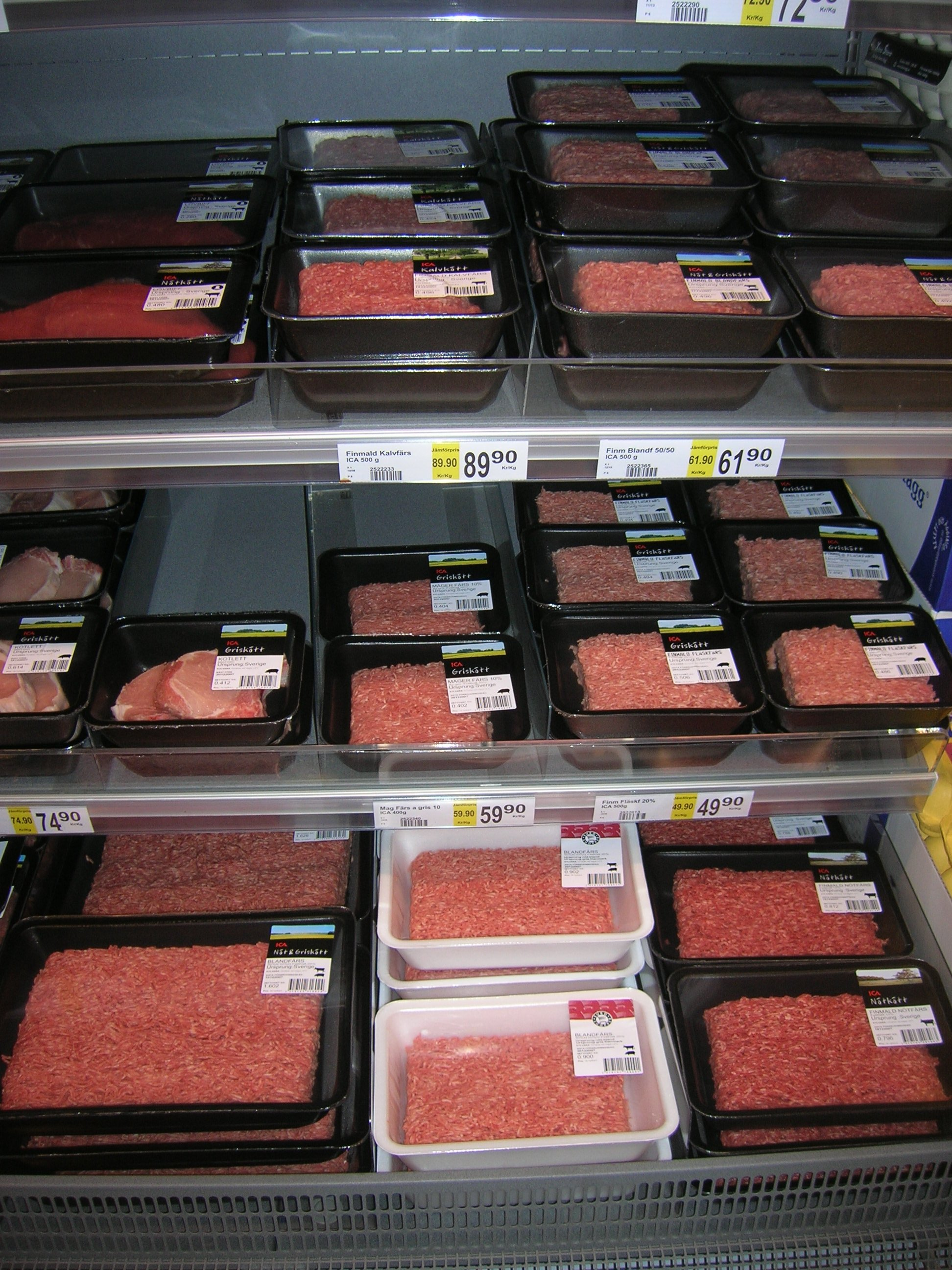
Meat in a ICA supermarket in Sweden c. 2007

A controversy surrounding the illegal repackaging of out-of-date meat led the Swedish grocery store chain ICA to take actions towards a better quality work in the stores. Prosecutors have launched a criminal investigation into four stores in the ICA supermarket chain, after a television documentary aired on December 5, 2007, revealed that they had repackaged out-of-date ground meat and put it back on the shelves in four of the largest hypermarkets in Sweden. ICA apologised, suspended all of its Christmas commercials and summoned all 1,400 store managers to an emergency meeting in Stockholm.

== Background ==
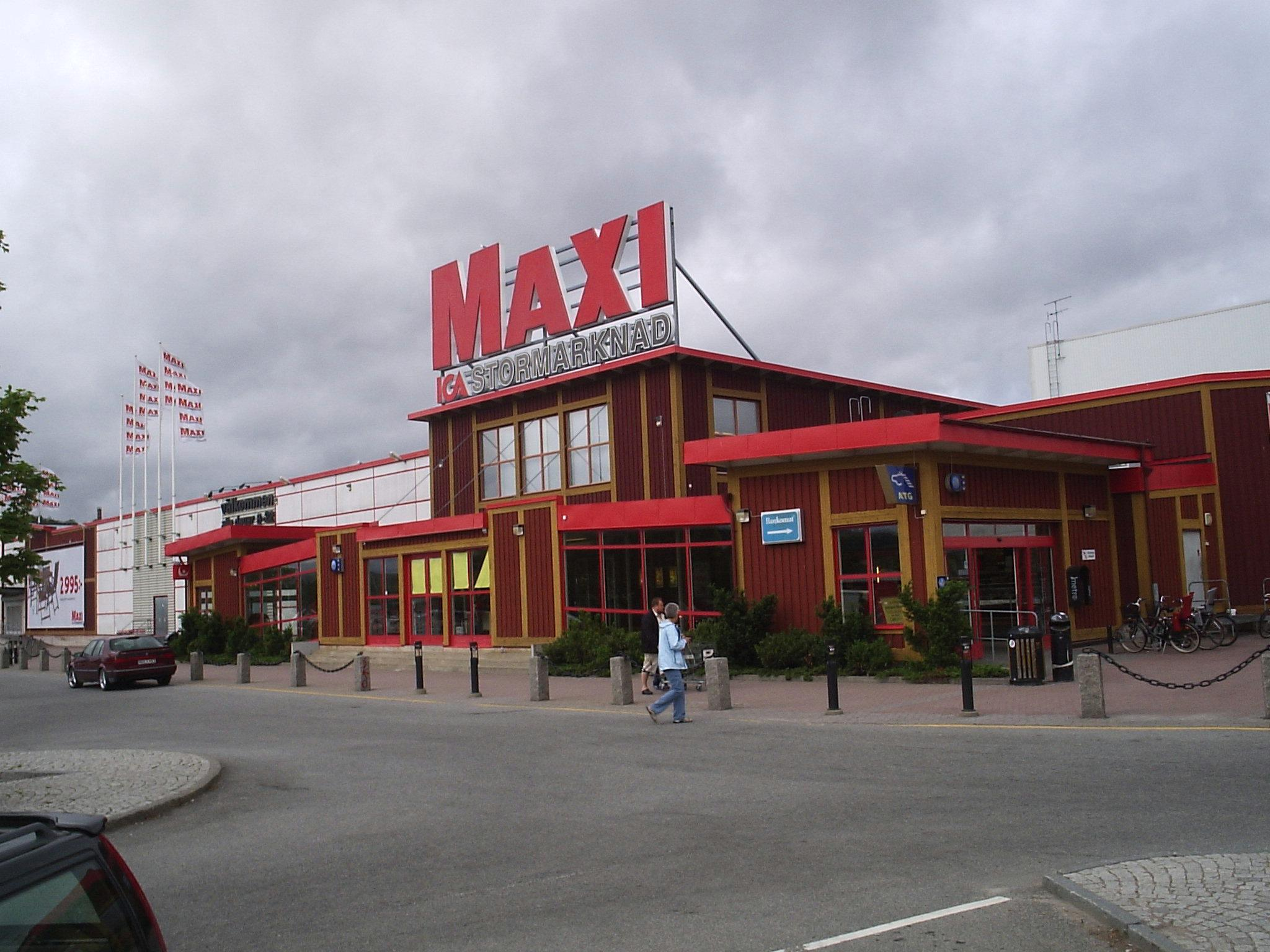
A typical Maxi ICA Hypermarket.

ICA food stores in Sweden are all owned and operated independently, although operations are co-ordinated and wholesale operations are run centrally. ICA is 60% owned by the Dutch retailer Ahold, with the remaining 40% owned by Hakon Invest, which is majority owned by local store managers who are also franchisers of the ICA brand. In 2006, The Swedish division, ICA Sverige AB (literally: ICA Sweden Ltd), operated 1,397 retail stores, run by some 1,400 store managers. The largest stores are operated under the store brand Maxi ICA Stormarknad; these are hypermarkets with a full range of groceries as well as fashions, homewares, entertainment and electrical goods. Before the food safety irregularities were revealed, the ICA brand was regarded as one of the most trusted retail brands in Sweden, and the most trusted retail brand among the grocery store chains.

There has been a general prohibition of relabeling packed meat for many years in Sweden. The current legislation and a major part of the Swedish National Food Administration Regulations are based on European Union law. According to the National Food Administration, some 1,000 food safety inspectors make annually between 25,000 and 30,000 inspections in the country. As regards the retail market, the local municipalities are responsible for controlling and acting against food safety irregularities.

=== Irregularities revealed ===
On December 5, 2007, Sveriges Television in its weekly investigatory documentary program Uppdrag granskning (literally: Mission: Investigation) aired a number of secretly recorded video tapes of employees at four featured Maxi ICA Hypermarkets relabeling out-of-date ground meat, as well as grinding down other forms of meat past their 'best before' date to make ground meat (mince). In a video sequence viewers could watch an ICA employee picking up out-of-date pork chops from the floor, repacking and relabeling them. This could lead to infections such as Escherichia coli, Trichinellosis or Streptococcus suis.

According to the rating institute MMS MediaMätning, the documentary was one of the most watched television programs in Sweden that day, rating some 930,000 viewers.

Hans Hallén, a former quality control manager for ICA, revealed that the company knew that meat was being illegally repackaged as early as 2003. Hallén, who monitored ICA stores in southern Sweden from 2003–2005, said he had informed the company's managers of the exact practices that were exposed in the documentary program. According to Hallén, many stores engaged in practices such as repackaging meat in order to change the 'best before' date, saying that "they even re-minced meat that had already been out on the shelves, before repackaging it and putting it back out on the shelves". Sausage meats that had become old and sticky were also repackaged after rinsing, he said.

Hans Hallén, who was one of eight quality control managers employed by ICA until 2005, when the position was discontinued, said that "(his) main job was to train staff in order to ensure that scandals of this kind would not occur".

=== Store managers ===
- Mats Nilsson, Maxi ICA Hypermarket in Nacka,
- Markus Lönnroth, Maxi ICA Hypermarket in Botkyrka,
- Jonas Berg, Maxi ICA Hypermarket in Södertälje,
- Mikael Gadd and Mikael Andersson, Maxi ICA Hypermarket in Haninge.

The store managers who were confronted with the footage defended themselves, saying that "failures in routines and ignorance" were behind the practice, and that employees must have done this "on their own initiative" after being told not to do so by management. According to Uppdrag Granskning, Markus Lönnroth had also said that "everybody is doing this". Although confronted with compelling evidence, Jonas Berg said that "there is no evidence that [he had] done anything wrong". On December 13, it was announced that Markus Lönnroth had resigned and transferred ownership of his hypermarket to ICA Sverige.

== Reaction ==
Television viewers reacted strongly to the footage and the following day state prosecutors launched a criminal investigation. There have also been reports from at least two local food safety inspectors taking action. "After yesterday's program there are clear suspicions that a crime has been committed," said Daniel Selin, health inspector at Nacka municipality, one of the four municipalities to report stores.

ICA chief press officer Staffan Ekengren said the company had provided all the information that it possessed about the stores to the National Food Administration. "This is unacceptable, and I am surprised that it is so common and happens on such a systematic basis," he said, adding that it was "a clear breach" of the law. Ekengren said that ICA quality control managers are to visit the relevant stores at the weekend to hold meetings with those in charge. He also said that ICA's 1,400 independent store managers were to be summoned to an emergency conference with focus on food safety and ethics. Although the independent status of the ICA stores means that there is no possibility of sanctions, Ekengren said the incidents "make it relevant to discuss" whether a system of sanctions could be introduced. "These are large, successful stores which have acted in a completely irresponsible manner," he added. "We have had serious conversations with the merchants involved. They are naturally aware that a very major error has occurred," said Ekengren.

On December 6, ICA decided to suspend all its Christmas commercials, and only focus on the meat packing scandal. After criminal charges were brought against four of its stores, ICA issued an extended apology to its customers on its website. On December 10 there were reports of similar food safety irregularities also at ICA's main competing grocery store chains; Coop Norden and Axfood (with its store brands Hemköp and Willy's). According to Axfood, at least two of the chain's store managers have been fired due to illegal repacking of meat. On December 11, the Swedish National Food Administration filed criminal charges against the four Maxi ICA Hypermarkets where the irregularities had been revealed by the documentary for breach against the Food Safety Act and fraud.

On December 11, more than 1,000 of ICA's 1,400 Swedish store managers summoned at the emergency meeting in Stockholm, where CEO Kenneth Bengtsson said that the food safety irregularities had occurred also outside the four stores covered by the investigatory documentary. It was reported that ICA decided on "zero-tolerance" against food safety irregularities, as well as the introduction of an annual 3,000 un-announced self inspections throughout the network of ICA stores.

After the food safety irregularities were revealed, sales of ground meat fell by up to 50% at some ICA stores. At the same time, a survey showed that 50% of the consumers have no trust in the food safety in the retail market.

== See also ==
- Food safety
- Food quality
- Foodborne illness
