= Kristine Samuelson =

Documentary filmmaker

- Occupation: Documentary filmmaker

Kristine Samuelson is a documentary filmmaker and the Edward Clark Crossett Emerita Professor of Humanistic Studies at Stanford University. Her film, Life Overtakes Me (2020), made with John Haptas, was nominated for an Oscar for best short-subject documentary, for the 92nd Academy Awards—having premiered at the Sundance Film Festival. It also received Audience Awards at the Full Frame and Chicago Critics Film Festivals.
