= Uppdrag granskning =

- Genre: Current affairs Investigative journalism
- Presented by: Kattis Ahlström (2001–2002); Karin Hübinette (2002–2005); Elisif Elvinsdotter (2005–2006); Janne Josefsson (2006–2018); Karin Mattisson (2006–); Ali Fegan (2018–
- Country of origin: Sweden
- Original language: Swedish
- No. of seasons: 13

Production
- Running time: 60 minutes
- Production company: Sveriges Television

Original release
- Network: Sveriges Television: SVT2 (2001); SVT1 (2001–)
- Release: January 2001

Uppdrag granskning (English name: Mission: Investigate) is a Swedish television program focusing on investigative journalism. The program is produced by and aired on SVT and has become known for the use of concealed cameras and microphones. In April 2016, after an interview with Uppdrag granskning, the Icelandic prime minister Sigmundur Davíð Gunnlaugsson resigned, after a controversy concerning the Panama Papers.

In 2017, as part of the programs reporting on the Paradise Papers they uncovered that the plane used to fly the crown princess and her newly wed husband from their marriage ceremony was registered in a tax haven. According to the program, the pilots who flew the couple have also been charged by Swedish court for tax avoidance. The Swedish royal family response was that the trip was not paid for by the royal house, but was a gift and therefore not their responsibility.

== See also ==
- ICA meat repackaging controversy
- Sigmundur Davíð Gunnlaugsson
