= Life Overtakes Me =

2019 documentary film by Kristine Samuelson and John Haptas

- Film poster
- Directed by: Kristine Samuelson; John Haptas
- Distributed by: Netflix
- Release dates: April 7, 2019 (Full Frame Film Festival); June 14, 2019
- Running time: 39 minutes
- Countries: Sweden, United States
- Language: English

Life Overtakes Me (Swedish: De apatiska barnen; English: The Apathetic Children) is a 2019 Swedish-American documentary film directed by Kristine Samuelson and John Haptas. The film shows how hundreds of refugee children in Sweden withdraw into a coma-like illness called resignation syndrome, apparently because of traumatic experiences they had.

The film was released on Netflix on June 14, 2019. As of March 2025, 100% of the five critical reviews compiled on Rotten Tomatoes are positive, with an average rating of 7.7/10.

The film was nominated for an Oscar for best short-subject documentary, for the 92nd Academy Awards in 2020.

== Controversy ==
According to witnesses cited by the Swedish magazine Filter, one of the children profiled in the film was pressured by her parents to simulate resignation syndrome for the express purpose of improving the family's prospects for permanent residence status in Sweden. The witnesses insisted that the girl had been a well-functioning, normal child who was coached into faking her illness when doctors and officials were present.

Sweden's public television network, SVT, interviewed Swedish pediatrician Karl Sallin, who said that the filmmakers had cherry-picked phrases from interviews with him in a "reckless and dangerous" fashion, distorting his view of the situation. SVT sought the producers repeatedly for comment, who chose not to respond.
