= Janne Josefsson =

Swedish investigative journalist (born 1952)

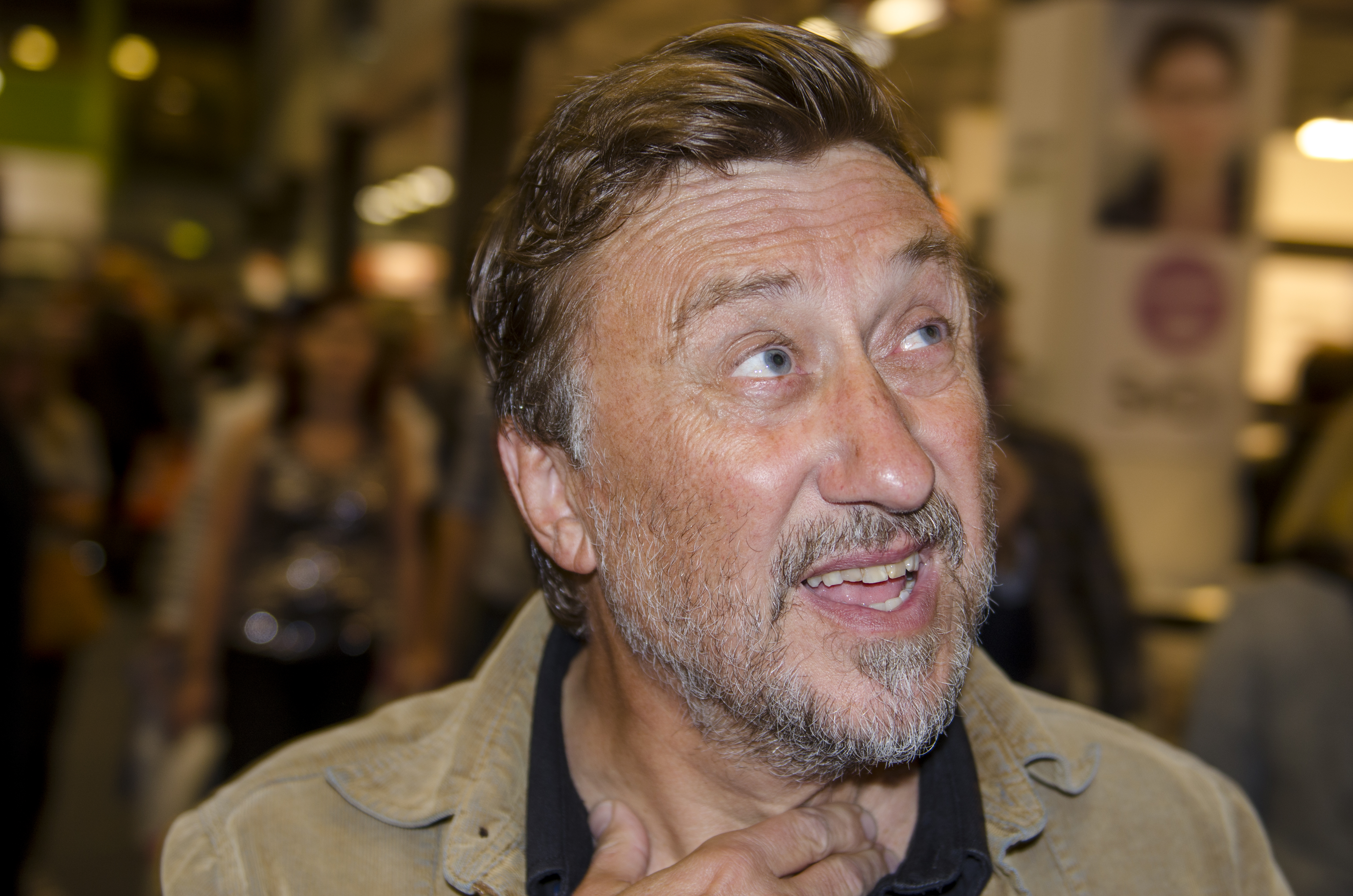
- Josefsson at the Gothenburg Book Fair in 2014
- Born: Jan Christer Ragnar Josefsson; 27 June 1952 (age 73); Gothenburg, Sweden
- Occupations: Journalist; television host

Jan Christer Ragnar Josefsson (born 27 June 1952) is a Swedish investigative journalist who has had numerous shows on Sveriges Television such as Fittja Paradiso, Uppdrag Granskning and Debatt. Uppdrag Granskning has uncovered some of Sweden's most noted scandals such as the ICA meat repackaging controversy, and have both received journalistic prizes and attracted criticism for e.g. biased reporting.

== Bibliography ==
- Josefsson J.; Zetterberg M. (1976). Behöver vänstern gå i terapi?. Bokförlaget Forum. ISBN 9137064169.
