= Basshunter discography =

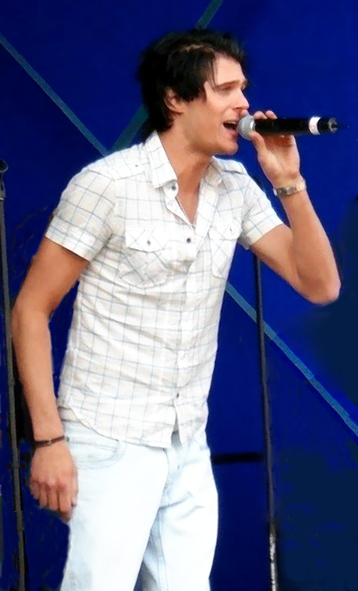
- Basshunter during the concert in Halmstad, 20 April 2008
- Studio albums: 5
- Compilation albums: 2
- Singles: 31
- Promotional singles: 5
- Remixes: 7

Basshunter, a Swedish singer, record producer and DJ, has released five studio albums, two compilation albums, 30 singles, five promotional singles and seven remixes. The Bassmachine, Basshunter's debut studio album, was released by Alex Music on 25 August 2004. In April 2006, he signed his first contract with Extensive Music and Warner Music Sweden. His single "Boten Anna" charted at number one on the Danish singles chart, where it stayed for fourteen weeks; it was certified triple platinum by IFPI Danmark. "Boten Anna" also reached number one in the Swedish singles chart and was certified platinum by IFPI Sverige. His second studio album LOL, released on 28 August 2006, charted in the top five in Sweden, Denmark and Finland. The album was certified platinum by IFPI Finland and double platinum by IFPI Danmark. In late 2006, Basshunter released his albums The Bassmachine and The Old Shit through his own website. Basshunter's third single "Vi sitter i Ventrilo och spelar DotA" was certified gold by IFPI Danmark. Basshunter collaborated with the duo Patrik & Lillen on his single "Vifta med händerna".

The single "Now You're Gone", which uses the same music as "Boten Anna", was originally recorded by Mental Theo and sung by Sebastian Westwood but in 2007, Basshunter recorded a shorter version of "Now You're Gone" to appeal to international audiences. The song subsequently charted at number one on the British and Irish singles charts, and stayed there for five weeks. It was also certified platinum by the British Phonographic Industry and Recorded Music NZ. The second single released was a cover of the KC and the Sunshine Band song "Please Don't Go". The third single was "All I Ever Wanted", which uses the music from "Vi sitter i Ventrilo och spelar DotA" in the style of "Now You're Gone". It charted at number one in Ireland and at number two in the United Kingdom, and was certified platinum by the British Phonographic Industry and Recorded Music NZ. Now You're Gone – The Album was released on 14 July 2008 and like the single was certified platinum by the British Phonographic Industry and double platinum by Recorded Music NZ. The fourth single was "Angel in the Night", which was followed by a cover of Westlife's song "I Miss You". Basshunter's sixth and final single from Now You're Gone – The Album was "Walk on Water", which accompanied a deluxe edition re-release of the album featuring new remixes and the previous four singles from the album.

The single "Every Morning" was released before Basshunter's fifth studio album Bass Generation, which was released on 25 September 2009. The album was certified gold by the British Phonographic Industry. The second single was "I Promised Myself", a cover of a Nick Kamen song. A compilation album titled The Early Bedroom Sessions was released on 3 December 2012; it Includes seven songs from The Old Shit, all ten songs from The Bassmachine, and the tracks "Go Down Now", "Trance Up" and "Wacco Will Kick Your Ass", which had previously appeared on singles, and three unreleased songs. On 13 May 2013 he released his sixth studio album Calling Time. The album charted on the American Dance/Electronic Albums chart at number 25. Five tracks from the album were released as singles: "Saturday" (2010), "Fest i hela huset" (2011), "Northern Light", "Dream on the Dancefloor" (2012), "Crash & Burn" and "Calling Time" (2013). "Saturday" was certified gold by Recorded Music NZ. "Fest i hela huset" charted at number five in Sweden; it was recorded in collaboration with participants from the Swedish Big Brother series.

== Albums ==
=== Studio albums ===
List of studio albums, with selected chart positions and details, certifications and sales figures
Title	Album details	Peak chart positions										Sales	Certifications
Title	Album details	SWE	AUT	DEN	EUR	FIN	FRA	IRL	NOR	NZL	UK	Sales	Certifications
The Bassmachine	Released: 25 August 2004; Label: Alex Music; Format: CD, digital download	—	—	—	—	—	—	—	—	—	—		
LOL	Released: 28 August 2006; Label: Warner Music Sweden; Format: CD, digital download, streaming	5	12	3	82	4	51	—	19	—	—	FIN: 33,365	IFPI DEN: 2× Platinum; IFPI FIN: Platinum
Now You're Gone – The Album	Released: 14 July 2008; Label: Hard2Beat; Format: CD, CD+DVD, digital download, streaming	38	17	—	6	35	36	2	—	1	1	UK: 376,017; NZL: 22,000	BPI: Platinum; IFPI DEN: Platinum; RMNZ: 2× Platinum
Bass Generation	Released: 25 September 2009; Label: Warner Music Sweden; Format: CD, 2×CD, digital download, streaming	—	—	39	58	—	41	16	—	2	16	UK: 15,046	BPI: Gold
Calling Time	Released: 13 May 2013; Label: Gallo Record Company; Format: CD, digital download, streaming	—	—	—	* (Note: The European Albums chart was defunct by the end of 2010.)	—	—	—	—	—	—		
"—" denotes a recording that did not chart or was not released in that territory.

=== Compilation albums ===
List of compilation albums, with selected details
Title	Album details
The Old Shit	Released: Second half of 2006; Label: Self-released; Format: Digital download
The Early Bedroom Sessions	Released: 3 December 2012; Label: Rush Hour; Format: 2×CD, digital download, streaming

== Singles ==
=== As lead artist ===
List of singles as lead artist, with selected chart positions, certifications and album name
Title	Year	Peak chart positions										Sales	Certifications	Album
Title	Year	SWE	AUT	DEN	FIN	GER	IRL	NLD	NOR	NZL	UK	Sales	Certifications	Album
"The Big Show"	2004	—	—	—	—	—	—	—	—	—	—			The Bassmachine
"Welcome to Rainbow"	2006	—	—	—	—	—	—	—	—	—	—			Non-album single
"Boten Anna"	2006	1	2	1	4	9	—	2	3	—	—	EUR: 500,000; SWE: 60,000; DEN: 27,000; FIN: 8,044	IFPI SWE: Platinum; IFPI AUT: Gold; IFPI DEN: 3× Platinum	LOL
"Vi sitter i Ventrilo och spelar DotA"	2006	6	18	7	2	— (Note: The Offizielle Deutsche Charts subpage for "Vi sitter i Ventrilo och spelar DotA" and the artist's subpage indicate chart entries for both "Vi sitter i Ventrilo och spelar DotA" and "DotA" versions on 19 October 2007, with peak positions of 33 and 30 respectively. However, the chart subpage for 19 October 2007 does not list "Vi sitter i Ventrilo och spelar DotA", but instead lists "DotA" at number 33 while "Alles verloren" by Bushido is listed at number 30. "DotA" peaked at number 30 on 2 November.)	49	9	7	—	—		IFPI DEN: Gold	LOL
"Jingle Bells"	2006	13	—	—	—	—	—	31	9	—	35			LOL
"Vifta med händerna" (vs. Patrik & Lillen)	2006	25	—	—	7	—	—	—	—	—	—			LOL
"DotA"	2007	—	—	—	—	30	—	—	—	—	—		IFPI DEN: Gold	Non-album single
"Now You're Gone" (featuring DJ Mental Theo's Bazzheadz)	2007	2	14	14	8	18	1	—	10	3	1	UK: 667,000	BPI: 2× Platinum; IFPI DEN: Gold; RMNZ: Platinum	Now You're Gone – The Album
"Please Don't Go"	2008	6	—	—	—	—	—	—	—	—	—			Now You're Gone – The Album
"All I Ever Wanted"	2008	58	15	—	—	35	1	—	3	17	2	UK: 26,044	BPI: Platinum; IFPI DEN: Gold; RMNZ: Platinum	Now You're Gone – The Album
"Angel in the Night"	2008	50	—	—	—	—	10	—	—	—	14	UK: 4,592	BPI: Silver	Now You're Gone – The Album
"Russia Privjet (Hardlanger Remix)"	2008	—	—	—	—	—	—	—	—	—	—			Now You're Gone – The Album
"I Miss You"	2008	45	—	—	—	70	—	—	—	—	32			Now You're Gone – The Album
"Walk on Water"	2009	—	—	—	—	—	—	—	—	—	76			Now You're Gone – The Album
"Al final" (featuring Dani Mata)	2009	—	—	—	—	—	—	—	—	—	—			Non-album single
"Every Morning"	2009	13	—	—	—	76	17	—	—	14	17	UK: 12,876		Bass Generation
"I Promised Myself"	2009	—	—	—	—	—	—	—	—	—	94			Bass Generation
"Saturday"	2010	—	—	—	—	—	37	—	—	14	21		RMNZ: Gold	Calling Time
"Fest i hela huset" (vs. Big Brother)	2011	5	—	—	—	—	—	—	—	—	—			Calling Time
"Northern Light"	2012	—	—	—	—	—	—	—	—	—	—			Calling Time
"Dream on the Dancefloor"	2012	—	—	—	—	—	—	—	—	—	—			Calling Time
"Crash & Burn"	2013	—	—	—	—	—	—	—	—	—	—			Calling Time
"Calling Time"	2013	—	—	—	—	—	—	—	—	—	—			Calling Time
"Elinor"	2013	—	—	—	—	—	—	—	—	—	—			Non-album singles
"Masterpiece"	2018	—	—	—	—	—	—	—	—	—	—			Non-album singles
"Home"	2019	—	—	—	—	—	—	—	—	—	—			Non-album singles
"Angels Ain't Listening"	2020	—	—	—	—	—	—	—	—	—	—			Non-album singles
"Life Speaks to Me"	2021	—	—	—	—	—	—	—	—	—	—			Non-album singles
"End the Lies" (with Alien Cut)	2022	—	—	—	—	—	—	—	—	—	—			Non-album singles
"Ingen kan slå (Boten Anna)" (with Victor Leksell)	2023	4	—	—	—	—	—	—	—	—	—			Non-album singles
"Ja eller nej" (with Käärijä)	2026	—	—	—	12	—	—	—	—	—	—			Non-album singles
"—" denotes a recording that did not chart or was not released in that country.

=== Promotional singles ===
List of promotional singles and album name
Title	Year	Album
"Syndrome de Abstenencia"	2004	The Bassmachine
"Wacco Will Kick Your Ass"	2005	The Early Bedroom Sessions
"I Can Walk on Water I Can Fly"	2007	Non-album single
"Russia Privjet"	2007	LOL
"Megamix"	2008	Non-album single

== Other charted songs ==
List of songs, with selected chart positions and album name
Title	Year	Peak chart positions	Album
Title	Year	SWE	Album
"Hallå där"	2006	51	LOL

== Remixes ==
=== Singles ===
List of remixes, artist and album name
Title	Year	Artist(s)	Album
"Dancing Lasha Tumbai" (Basshunter Remix)	2007	Verka Serduchka	Non-album remixes
"Du hast den schönsten Arsch der Welt" (Basshunter's Bass My Ass Radio Remix) "Du hast den schönsten Arsch der Welt" (Basshunter's Bass My Ass Extended Remix)	2007	Alex C. feat. Y-ass	Non-album remixes
"Ieva's polka (Ievan polkka)" [Basshunter Remix]	2007	Loituma	Non-album remixes
"When You Leave (Numa Numa)" (Basshunter Radio Mix)	2008	Alina	Everybody Wants Me
"When You Leave (Numa Numa)" (Basshunter Extended Mix)	2009	Alina	Everybody Wants Me
"Crash & Burn" (Basshunter Remix)	2013	Basshunter	Non-album remix
"Sex Love Rock n Roll (SLR)" [Basshunter Remix] "Sex Love Rock n Roll (SLR)" [Basshunter Remix Extended Version]	2014	Arash feat. T-Pain	Superman

=== Promotional singles ===
List of remixes, artist and album name
Title	Year	Artist(s)	Album
"Calcutta 2008" (Basshunter Remix)	2007	Dr. Bombay	The Hits

== Writing discography ==
List of written songs, artist, album name and the co-writers
Title	Year	Artist(s)	Peak chart positions		Album	Co-written with
Title	Year	Artist(s)	SWE	BEL (WA)	Album	Co-written with
"Mange kommer hem till dig"	2015	Mange Makers	— (Note: "Mange kommer hem till dig" did not enter the Veckolista Singlar, but peaked at number 3 on the Veckolista Heatseeker chart.)	—	Non-album singles	Max Christensson; Max Henriksson; Didrik Rastbäck; Wrethov
"Shut Up Chicken"	2020	El Capon	—	— (Note: "Shut Up Chicken" did not enter the Ultratop 50, but peaked at number 22 on the Wallonish Ultratip chart.)	Non-album singles	Claydee; Thomas Jules; Ilkay Sencan
"Charlie"	2020	Lana Scolaro	—	—	Non-album singles	Tim Aeby; Linnea Deb; Robert Uhlmann; Svidden
"—" denotes a recording that did not chart or was not released in that country.

== See also ==
- List of songs recorded by Basshunter
