= Basshunter videography =

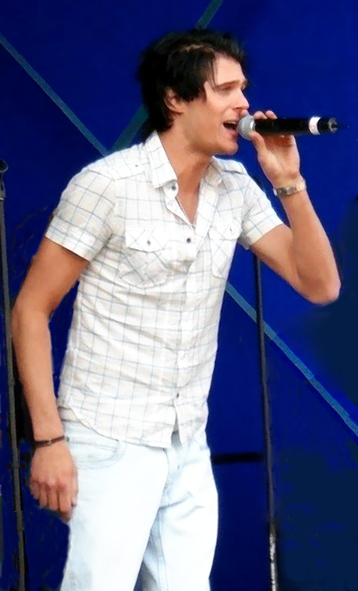
- Basshunter during the concert in Halmstad, 20 April 2008
- Music videos: 19
- Lyric videos: 5
- Remix videos: 2
- Video megamixes: 1
- Promotional video singles: 5
- Short films: 4
- Television: 12
- Commercials: 1

Basshunter is a Swedish singer, record producer and DJ. He has released nineteen music videos, five lyric videos, two remix videos, one video megamix and five promotional video singles, and has made a guest appearance in one music video. Basshunter appeared in four short films, twelve television shows and one commercial.

From his second album LOL (2006), Basshunter released music videos for the singles "Boten Anna", "Vi sitter i Ventrilo och spelar DotA", "Vifta med händerna" and "Jingle Bells". Carl-Johan Westregård and Kim Parrot directed the music videos for "Boten Anna" and "Vi sitter i Ventrilo och spelar DotA". A second version of the music video for the former was made. In 2007, a music video for the reissue of "Vi sitter i Ventrilo och spelar DotA" titled "DotA" was released.

The deluxe edition of Basshunter's third studio album Now You're Gone – The Album (2008) includes the single "Walk on Water" which had been released also as a promotional video single. A special version of Now You're Gone – The Album released in New Zealand and Poland contains a DVD that comprises nine Basshunter music videos, including "Now You're Gone", "All I Ever Wanted", "Angel in the Night" and "I Miss You" – all directed by Alex Herron. For his fourth studio album Bass Generation (2009), Basshunter released the music videos for "Every Morning" and "I Promised Myself", both directed by Alex Herron. A series of music videos featuring model Aylar Lie received media attention. "Now You're Gone" became the most-viewed British YouTube video of 2008, and third most-viewed YouTube video of 2009 with 65 million views.

The release of Basshunter's fifth album Calling Time (2013) was preceded by the release of music videos for its singles "Saturday", "Northern Light"—both directed by Alex Herron—and "Dream on the Dancefloor". The music video for "Saturday" charted at number one in Poland. In 2011, he appeared in Arash's music video for "Melody". He appeared on the Maspalomas Pride 2012 box-set containing live recordings of various artists. The music videos for "Crash & Burn" and "Calling Time" were later released. Gareth Evans directed the music videos for "Dream on the Dancefloor" and "Calling Time", and "Crash & Burn" was directed by Farzad Bayat. In 2018, Basshunter released a lyric video for "Masterpiece".

Basshunter has appeared on television, including the ninth episode of the 23rd season of Never Mind the Buzzcocks, the seventh season of Celebrity Big Brother and a Rock and Pop celebrity episode of Weakest Link. He is also featured in a commercial for JME Data. In 2021 he appeared in Basshunter Dota Revival, Netflix's trailer for Dota: Dragon's Blood. The trailer shows Basshunter singing about playing Dota 2 and scenes from Dragon's Blood in between.

== Music videos ==
=== As lead artist ===
List of music videos as lead artist, selected chart positions and directors
Title	Year	Peak chart positions	Director(s)	Ref.
Title	Year	POL	Director(s)	Ref.
"Boten Anna"	2006	— (Note: Polish chart was launched in 2010.)	Carl-Johan Westregård; Kim Parrot	
"Vi sitter i Ventrilo och spelar DotA"	2006	—	Carl-Johan Westregård; Kim Parrot	
"Vifta med händerna"	2006	—	Unknown (Note: Music video for "DotA" was directed by Luna Square. Andrés Rignell was director of photography.)	
"Boten Anna" (Version 2)	2007	—	Unknown	
"DotA"	2007	—	Unknown	
"Now You're Gone"	2007	—	Alex Herron	
"All I Ever Wanted"	2008	—	Alex Herron	
"All I Ever Wanted" (Basshunter's Cut)	2008	—	Unknown	
"Angel in the Night"	2008	—	Alex Herron	
"I Miss You" (Note: Music video of "I Miss You" was reused for "Jingle Bells" single in 2009.)	2008	—	Alex Herron	
"Walk on Water"	2009	—	Unknown	
"Walk on Water" (Fan Edit)	2009	—	Unknown	
"Every Morning"	2009	—	Alex Herron (Note: Anders Flatland was director of photography on "Every Morning" music video.)	
"I Promised Myself"	2009	—	Alex Herron (Note: Anders Anderson was assistant director on "I Promised Myself" music video.)	
"Saturday"	2010	1	Alex Herron	
"Northern Light"	2012	—	Alex Herron	
"Dream on the Dancefloor" (Note: Censored version of "Dream on the Dancefloor" music video was also released (uncredited).)	2012	—	Gareth Evans	
"Crash & Burn"	2013	—	Farzad Bayat	
"Calling Time" (Note: Censored version of "Calling Time" music video was also released (uncredited).)	2013	—	Gareth Evans	
"—" denotes a music video that did not chart or was not released in that country.

=== Lyric videos ===
List of lyric videos and directors
Title	Year	Director(s)	Ref.
"Masterpiece"	2018	Unknown	
"Home"	2019	Jay Vasquez	
"Angels Ain't Listening"	2020	Jay Vasquez	
"Life Speaks to Me"	2021	Unknown	
"End the Lies" (with Alien Cut)	2022	Unknown	

=== Remix videos ===
List of remix videos and directors
Title	Year	Remix director(s)	Ref.
"I Promised Myself" (Pete Hammond Remix) Remix used: Pete Hammond Remix	2009	Unknown	
"Dream on the Dancefloor" (Hi Def Remix) Remix used: Hi Def Remix	2012	Unknown	

=== Guest appearances ===
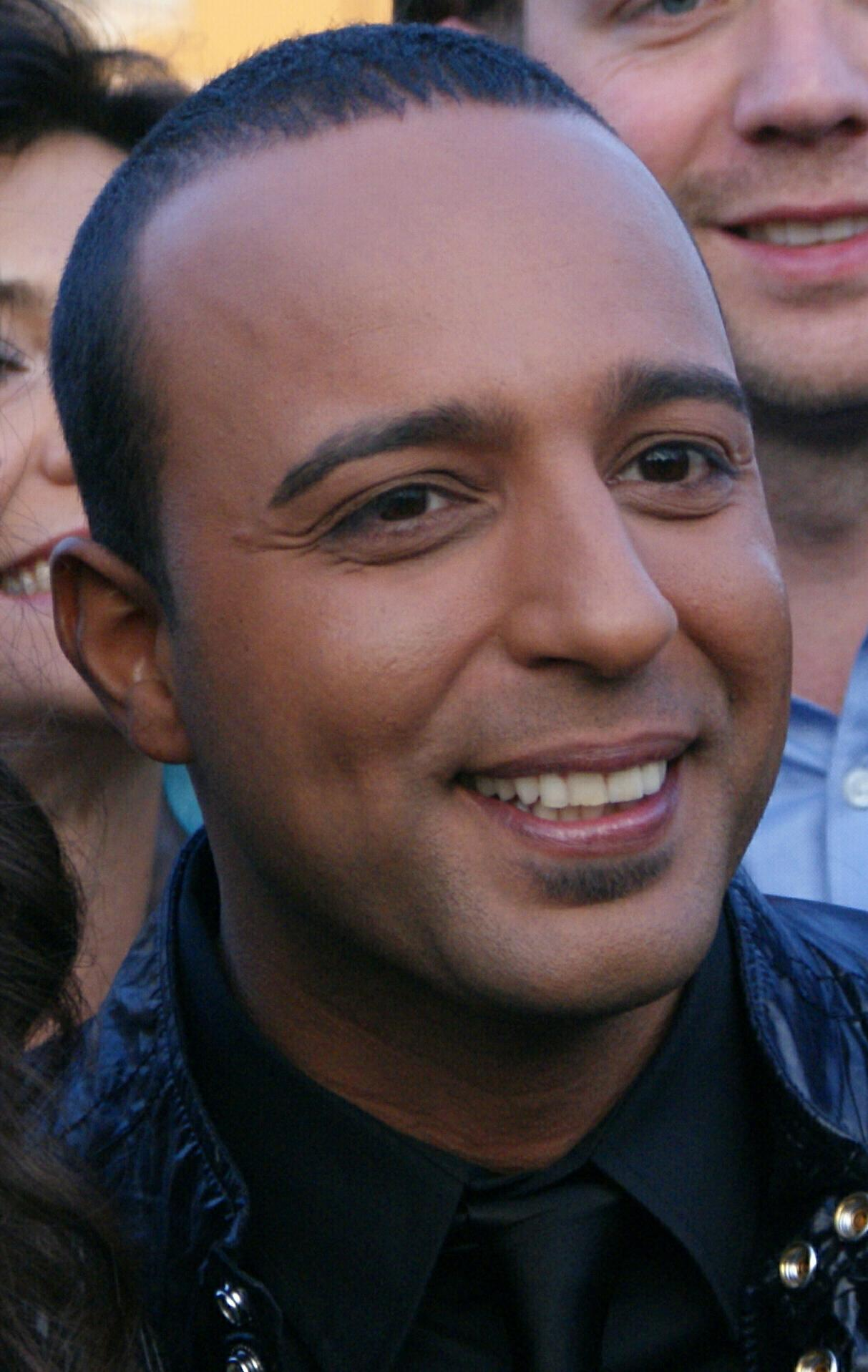
Basshunter appears in Arash's music video for "Melody"

List of guest appearances in music videos and directors
Title	Year	Artist(s)	Director(s)	Ref.
"Melody"	2011	Arash	Unknown (Note: Music video for "Melody" was assembled by Farbod Khoshtinat.)	

== Video megamixes ==
List of video megamixes and directors
Title	Year	Remix director(s)	Ref.
"Video Megamix" Contains: "Now You're Gone", "All I Ever Wanted", "Angel in the Night", "I Miss You" and "Walk on Water"	2008	Unknown	

== Promotional video singles ==
List of promotional video singles
Title	Year	Ref.
"Now You're Gone"	2007	
"All I Ever Wanted"	2008	
"Walk on Water"	2009	
"Every Morning"	2009	
"I Promised Myself"	2009	
"Saturday"	2010	

== Albums ==
=== Studio albums ===
List of studio albums, with details and notes
Title	Album details	Note
Now You're Gone – The Album	Released: 14 July 2008 (Note: Original release date.); Label: Extensive Music; Format: CD+DVD	Special version of album released in New Zealand and Poland contains DVD with nine Basshunter music videos.

=== Guest appearances ===
List of guest appearances, with details and notes
Title	Album details	Note
Maspalomas Pride 2012	Released: May 2012; Filmed by GBCTelevision.com; Format: 2×DVD, Blu-ray	Box set contains live recordings of various artists.

== Short films ==
List of short films, roles and notes
Title	Year	Role	Ref.
The End of Old Things	2009	Director; Producer	
Playing with Arnold	2011	Actor	
Welcome to Bass Server	2014	Actor	
Basshunter Dota Revival	2021	Actor	

== Television ==
List of television appearances, roles and notes
Title	Year	Role	Note	Ref.
Sound	2009	Guest	Season 3, episode 23	
Pocket TV	2009	Unknown	Episode: "Face Invaders"	
The 5:19 Show	2009	Unknown	Season 1, episode 2 and 14; Season 2 episode 5	
Red Bull Rivals	2009	Guest	Season 1, episode 2	
Never Mind the Buzzcocks	2009	Guest	Season 23, episode 9	
Something for the Weekend	2010	Guest	13 June 2010	
Basil and Barney's Swap Shop	2010	Unknown	Season 3, episode 17	
Celebrity Big Brother	2010	Participant	Season 7	
Fångarna på fortet	2010	Participant	Episode 5	
Weakest Link	2010	Participant	Rock and Pop	
Big Brother	2011	Unknown	Season 5	
Det svenska popundret	2019	Unknown	Episode 5: "Ett paradis för pirater"	

== Commercials ==
List of commercials
Company	Year	Ref.
JME Data	2006	
