= Basshunter =

Swedish singer, record producer and DJ (born 1984)

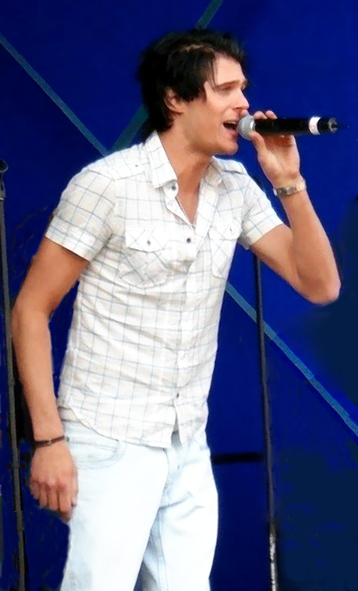
- Basshunter performing in Halmstad, 2008
- Born: Jonas Erik Altberg; 22 December 1984 (age 41); Halmstad, Sweden
- Occupations: Singer; record producer; songwriter; DJ
- Years active: 2001 (Note: He started singing in a choir aged 14 and started producing music aged 17.)–present
- Works: Discography; songs; videography; performances
- Spouse: Tina Makhia Khayatsadeh (m. 2017; div. 2018)
- Awards: Full list
- Musical career
- Genres: Eurodance; Hands up; hard dance
- Instruments: Vocals; software synthesizer
- Labels: Extensive Music; Warner Music Sweden; Ultra; Broma 16; Warner Music Japan; 3 Beat; Dance Nation; Ministry of Sound; Warner Music Germany; Alex Music
- Website: basshunter.se

Signature
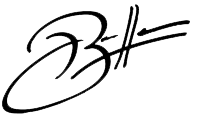

Jonas Erik Altberg (Swedish pronunciation: [ˈjûːnas ˈêːrɪk ˈâltbærj]; born 22 December 1984), known professionally as Basshunter, is a Swedish singer, record producer, songwriter and DJ. As indicated by his stage name, Basshunter is known for bass-heavy Eurodance music.

Born and raised in Halmstad, he moved to Malmö in 2006. As a young teen, Basshunter sang in a choir his mother ran. He started producing music at the age of 17, and later he started performing in local venues in his early career. In 2006, he self-released "Boten Anna" for free download a few months before he signed with labels Extensive Music and Warner Music Sweden and began commercial releases. His 2007 song "Now You're Gone" featuring Bazzheadz is based on Bazzheadz's "Now You're Gone" which uses the melody of "Boten Anna" with entirely different lyrics.

Basshunter has recorded five studio albums: The Bassmachine (2004), LOL (2006), Now You're Gone – The Album (2008), Bass Generation (2009), and Calling Time (2013). In addition to his own music, he has written for El Capon, Mange Makers, and Lana Scolaro. He has taken part in the seventh series of the British reality television show Celebrity Big Brother, episodes of the Swedish game show Fångarna på fortet, and an episode of the British television quiz show Weakest Link.

His accolades include a European Border Breakers Award, a Musikförläggarnas pris, a Telia award, and nominations for a BT Digital Music Award, two Grammis, an MTV Europe Music Award, and a Rockbjörnen. According to Svenska Dagbladet figures published in 2009, he has sold more than 3 million records. In May 2024 Basshunter was 60th most-streamed Swedish artist on Spotify with over 803 million streams.

== Early life ==
Jonas Erik Altberg was born on 22 December 1984 in Halmstad to Gunhild Elisabet (died 2016), a teacher and school principal as well as union representative for the Swedish Teachers' Union and Karl Göran Altberg, who worked for a construction company. He has a younger brother, Joakim; the family lived near Tylösand. His mother was from Hovmantorp. In his mid-teens he started singing in a choir his mother ran. He also sang for two years in a rock band, where he became acquainted with experimental music. He attended Kattegattgymnasiet secondary school with a technical specialization, but moved after two years to Sturegymnasiet, a secondary school in Halmstad with a music specialization. He finished secondary school in 2005, after which he attended college, but did not complete his education.

== Career ==
=== 2001–2006: Beginnings ===
Altberg began producing music at the age of 17 after six months of using the software program FruityLoops (FL Studio). He chose the stage name "Basshunter" in a reference to his musical style, and described the name as commercial and powerful. His father was tired of hearing the constant pounding when Basshunter was producing music inside the bedroom, so he built him a clubhouse.

In 2004, Basshunter was chosen in an online poll and performed live for the first time at a rave party in Älmhult. Alex Music released Basshunter's first studio album, The Bassmachine, on 25 August 2004. In 2005, a remastered version of this album with improved sound quality was released. In 2006, Basshunter re-released The Bassmachine as The Bass Machine and also released his first compilation album The Old Shit through his own website. Basshunter's interest in music deepened as time went by. He recorded a YouTube video, entitled Basshunter Tutorial, showing his recording process in FL Studio. The track from the video was covered over 200 times.

Basshunter published his music mainly through the Internet for free download on platforms such as chat channels and gaming websites. He was registered on online communities like Efterfest, LunarStorm, Nattstad, Porrigt, Playahead, Skunk and Trance.nu. For several years he was a DJ in Swedish clubs.

=== 2006–2008: LOL ===
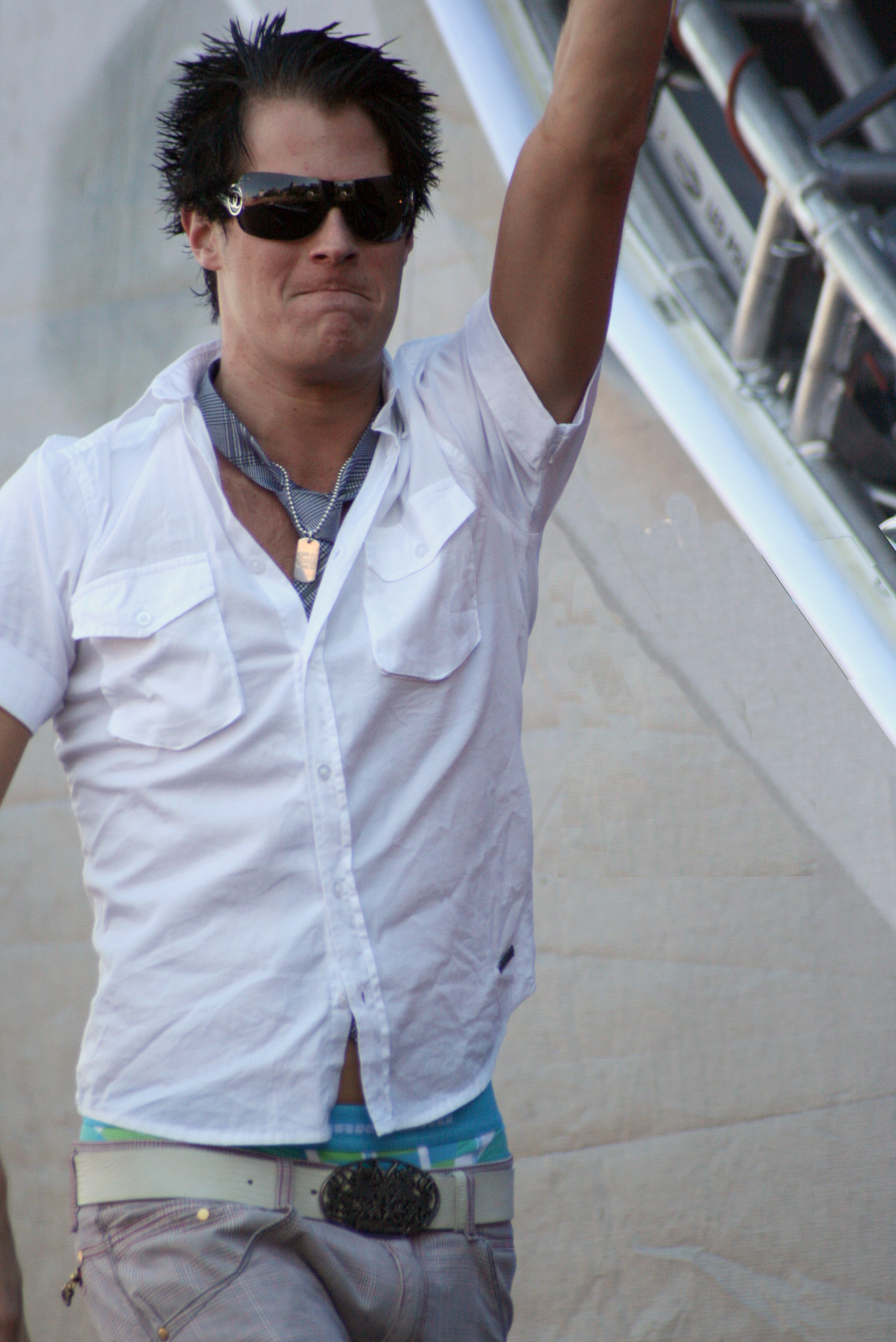
Basshunter during Hity Na Czasie at the final of Tall Ships Races, Szczecin, 5 August 2007

In March 2006, Basshunter published his song "Boten Anna" online and within twenty-four hours, it had been downloaded 37,000 times. Basshunter's single "Welcome to Rainbow" was released on 1 April 2006; it included the track "Boten Anna". With this success, Basshunter received several proposals from managers and music labels. Swedish DJ and party organizer Joakim Jarny contacted Basshunter via IRC and Jarny was soon overwhelmed by hundreds of requests from club owners in Sweden, Norway and Denmark who wanted Basshunter to perform at their clubs. Jarny contacted his friend Henrik Uhlmann at Extensive Music and in April 2006, Basshunter signed with Extensive Music and Warner Music Sweden. On 9 May 2006, "Boten Anna" was officially released as a single. By 8 June 2006, the song had been downloaded over one million times. In that year, he moved to Malmö, where the headquarters of Extensive Music are located.

"Boten Anna" peaked at number one on the Swedish singles chart and reached number 13 on the Swedish Best of All Time list, and was certified platinum. It also reached number one on the Danish singles chart, staying there for 14 weeks, and was certified triple platinum for selling 61,000 copies. It was also certified gold in Austria. "Boten Anna" was covered twice by Dutch duo Gebroeders Ko, whose "Boten Anna" bootleg charted at number three in the Netherlands, right after Basshunter's version. The next cover called "Sinterklaas boot (Boten Anna)" reached number two. An official German-language version was released in 2007.

Basshunter's second studio album LOL was released on 28 August 2006. He worked on the album for three and a half weeks, during which Ali Payami helped him with three songs. Basshunter described it as a connection of vocal music with hard dance and hard trance music; Basshunter's use of vocals is a significant departure from his earlier works. An American version of LOL was released on 1 January 2008, with the same Swedish songs as the original album but with lyrics and some titles translated into English. The new release also included new tracks, including "Now You're Gone", "Russia Privjet", "The Beat", "Jingle Bells", "Beer in the Bar" and "DotA (Club Mix)". A special version of this album was released in 2008, and includes the German version of "Boten Anna" and three music videos. LOL peaked at number five in Sweden, number four on the Finnish chart and number three on the Danish albums chart, and was certified double platinum in Denmark.

The second single from LOL, "Vi sitter i Ventrilo och spelar DotA", was released on 13 September of the same year. The single peaked at number two in Finland, number six in Sweden, and number seven in Norway and Denmark. It was certified gold in Denmark. His song "Hallå där" charted at number 51 on Swedish singles chart. The album's third single, a remake of the Christmas song "Jingle Bells", was released on 13 November and peaked at number nine in Norway, and number 13 in Sweden. The single also made it onto the Dutch and United Kingdom charts. The single "Vifta med händerna", which features the duo Patrik & Lillen, peaked on the Finnish charts at number seven and on the Sweden charts at number 25. On 5 November 2007, a new version of the "Vi sitter i Ventrilo och spelar DotA" was released under the title "DotA"; it charted on Germany's singles chart. This is different from the 2008 version from Now You're Gone – The Album.

=== 2007–2009: Now You're Gone – The Album ===
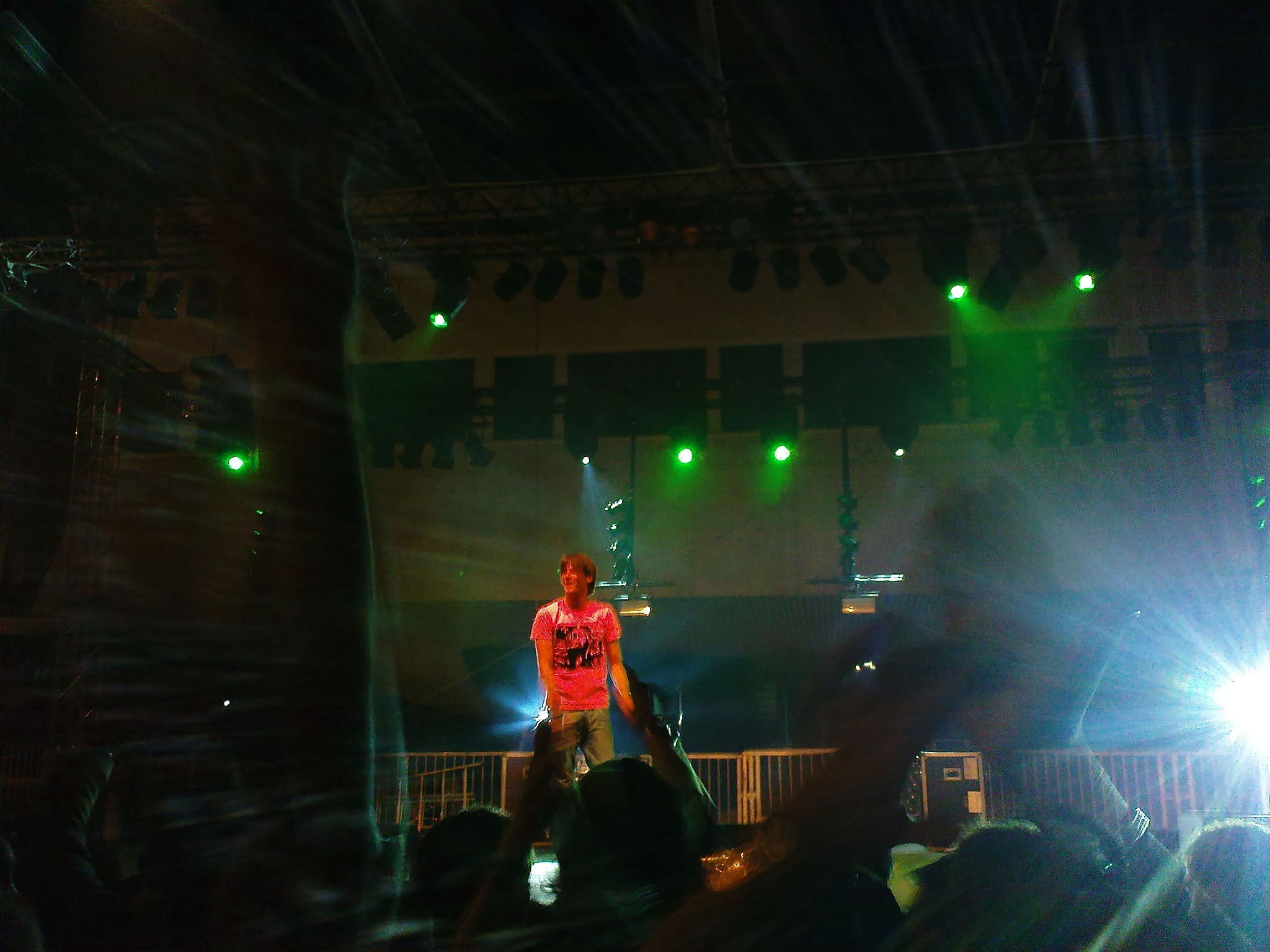
Basshunter during Point Gamma at École polytechnique, Palaiseau, first time in France, 7 June 2008

On 29 December 2007, an English-language version of "Boten Anna" entitled "Now You're Gone" was released. A year earlier, in 2006, DJ Mental Theo (under the alias Bazzheadz) had created a bootleg English version called "Now You're Gone" using the melody of "Boten Anna" with entirely different lyrics. Initially, Basshunter tried to translate "Boten Anna" into English but found it difficult to keep the "hock" and the story so he recorded his own version of "Now You're Gone" with DJ Mental Theo's lyrics. It was the initial release for Hard2Beat Records label (later Dance Nation). The single charted at number one in the United Kingdom, where it peaked at number one for five weeks. It was the first Swedish song to reach number one in the United Kingdom since "Dancing Queen" by ABBA. "Now You're Gone" sold in excess of 1,200,000 copies in the United Kingdom and was certified double platinum there. It also charted on the UK Top 100 Songs of the Decade list. "Now You're Gone" also stayed at the top for five weeks in Ireland, made it to number two on the Swedish chart, and number three in New Zealand, where the single was certified platinum. It was also certified gold in Denmark. On the French singles chart, "Now You're Gone" peaked at number six. "Now You're Gone" also charted at number four on the European Hot 100 Singles chart.

The next single "Please Don't Go", a cover of the KC and the Sunshine Band 1979 song, was released on 19 May 2008 and reached number six on the Swedish singles chart. The third single "All I Ever Wanted" was released on 29 June 2008 and peaked at number 2 in the United Kingdom, where it sold about 600,000 copies and was certified platinum. It was also certified platinum in New Zealand and gold in Denmark. It reached number one on the Irish singles chart and charted at number 10 on the European Hot 100 Singles chart.

Basshunter worked on Now You're Gone – The Album for two-and-a-half weeks before releasing it on 14 July 2008. The album entered the UK Albums Chart at number one sold 376,017 copies in the United Kingdom, and was certified platinum there. It also topped the album chart in New Zealand and was certified double platinum there. It was also certified gold in Denmark. Now You're Gone – The Album charted at number two in Ireland and reached number six on the European Top 100 Albums chart. The song "Angel in the Night" was released as a single on 8 September 2008; it charted at number 10 in Ireland and number 14 in the United Kingdom. In the United Kingdom it was certified silver. It also charted in Sweden. In 2008 Basshunter became the 11th-best-selling singles songwriter in the United Kingdom according to eight months of data compiled by Official Charts Company.

The album's fifth single "I Miss You" is a dance cover of a Westlife song and was released on 14 December 2008. The single appeared on the United Kingdom, Swedish, and German charts. On 5 April 2009, the single "Walk on Water" was released, as was a deluxe edition of the album that includes all of the original album together with remixes of singles; "I Can Walk on Water" was replaced with the single version and renamed "Walk on Water".

=== 2009: Bass Generation ===
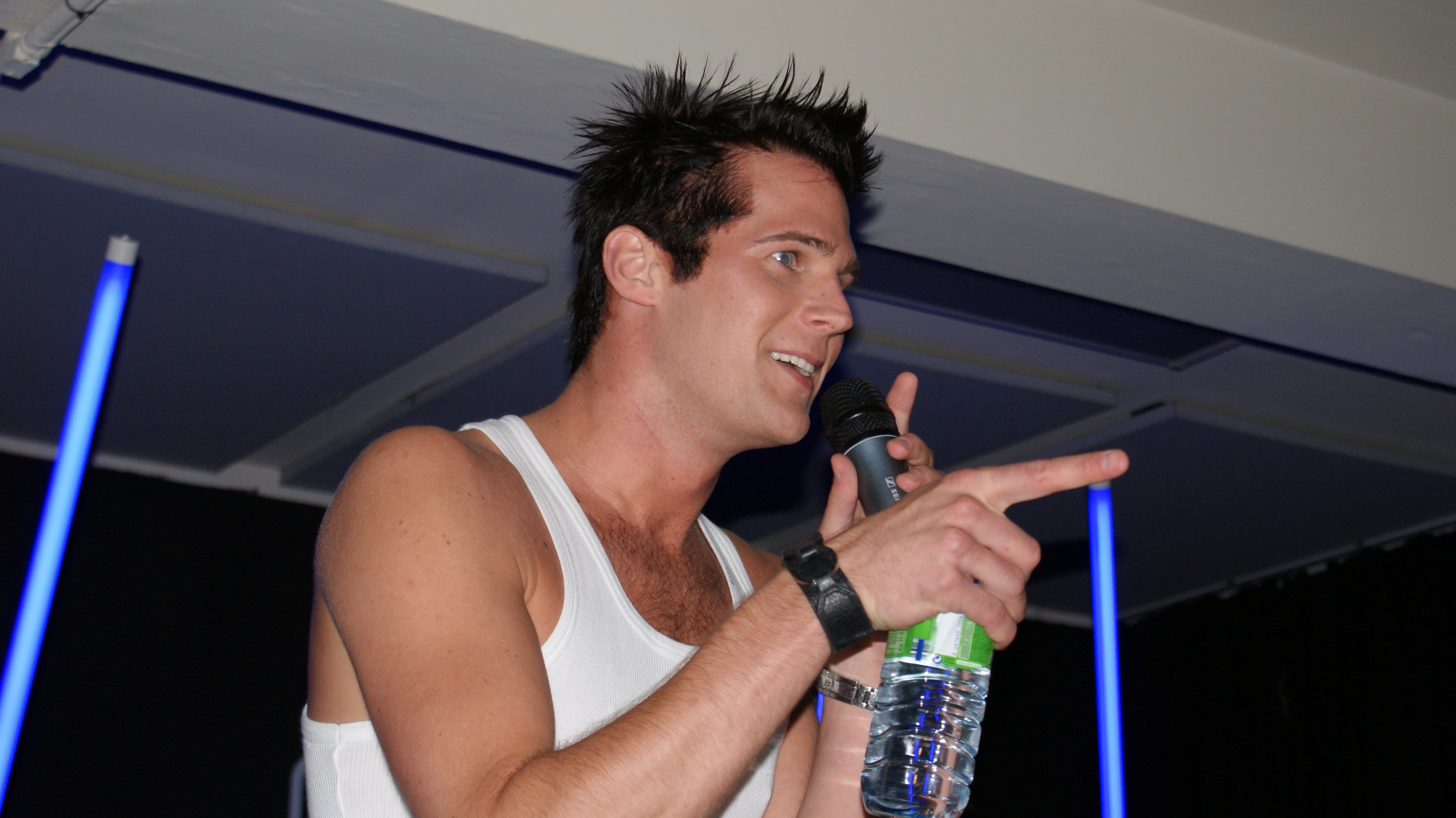
Basshunter at the beginning of his show at Gibson Guitar Studio, London, 24 September 2009

On 25 September 2009, Basshunter's fourth studio album Bass Generation, was released. The Double Album Version includes remixes of some of his singles, and the tracks "Without Stars" and the Swedish version of "Camilla". In early September 2009, prior to the album's release, the track "Numbers" was released as a free download via Basshunter's official Bebo account. Bass Generation reached number two in New Zealand, and number 16 in the United Kingdom and Irish album charts. It sold more than 100,000 copies and was certified gold in the United Kingdom.

The track "Every Morning" was released as a single on 18 September 2009; it reached number 13 on Swedish singles chart and number 14 in New Zealand. It peaked at number 17 in the United Kingdom and Ireland. "I Promised Myself", a cover of a Nick Kamen hit, was released on 29 November 2009.

=== 2010–2013: Calling Time and The Early Bedroom Sessions ===
The single "Saturday" was released on 5 July 2010; it reached number 14 on the New Zealand chart and was certified gold there. It also charted in the United Kingdom and Ireland. On 20 April 2011, the next Basshunter single "Fest i hela huset", which was recorded during his time in the Swedish Big Brother series, was released. The single charted at number five on the Swedish singles chart. His following single "Northern Light" was released on 14 May 2012 and the next single "Dream on the Dancefloor" was released on 18 November that year.

Basshunter's compilation album The Early Bedroom Sessions, which consists of tracks from albums The Bassmachine and The Old Shit, other early releases and unreleased tracks, was released on 3 December 2012. In 2012, Basshunter moved to Dubai and he also lived in Mallorca for six months. Extensive Music also moved to Dubai.

On 13 May 2013, Basshunter's fifth album Calling Time was released. In the version released in Ireland and in the United Kingdom, the track "Saturday" was replaced with "Open Your Eyes". Basshunter recorded more than 30 tracks for Calling Time and selected the final fifteen; he said he "tried to grow as an artist" with an album that has "classic Basshunter sounds" and previously unreleased music. The album charted at number 25 on the US Dance/Electronic Albums chart. On 20 June 2013, the single "Crash & Burn" was released; it charted on the Russian airplay chart. The last single from the album was "Calling Time", which was released on 27 September.

=== 2013–present: Singles ===
On 26 July 2013 Basshunter announced he was retiring from singing to focus on DJing, producing, and songwriting. He met new artists and invited them to sing on his songs. He made the decision after four exhaustive performances in four days. On 20 November 2013, the single "Elinor" was released. In 2014, Basshunter announced a new album was in work. In 2016, Basshunter returned to recording; he said he would not release a new studio album but would focus on recording singles in accordance with prevailing trends in music industry. Almost after five years since his last single, on 19 October 2018, the single "Masterpiece" was released; it did not appear on major national charts. Since then, he has released five more singles: "Home" (2019), "Angels Ain't Listening" (2020) and "Life Speaks to Me" (2021); a tribute to Avicii. His 2022 "End the Lies" is a collaboration with Italian duo Alien Cut. In 2023 he collaborated with Victor Leksell on "Ingen kan slå (Boten Anna)". It peaked at number four on the Swedish singles chart. In 2026 he collaborated with Käärijä on "Ja eller nej". It debuted at number 12 on the Finnish singles chart.

== Artistry ==
=== Musical style ===
Basshunter defined his music as Eurodance. (Note: In 2024 he defined his music wider as hard dance.) He says it is cheerful, full of energy and very melodic, stating it does not sound like other types of music, and that producers and artists display their own identities in their works. He is passionate about basslines and uses them in his music. Basshunter likes to create songs in minor scales. He has at least five unknown pseudonyms under which he produces music in secret. He always takes his laptop on concert tours so he can spontaneously record ideas and return to them when he is back in his main studio. Basshunter composes music and writes lyrics himself, though sometimes his agent helps with the lyrics to find the right English words. He likes to write lyrics that audiences can identify with. In 2018 Basshunter said that the music industry changed in previous years and it is harder now more than ever to stand out from other artists because it is easier to produce music. He added that it is more important than ever to adapt and an artist has to create something that people haven't heard before and described it as a holy grail. In 2020 Basshunter described himself as quite an emotional producer after a few years break from producing music.

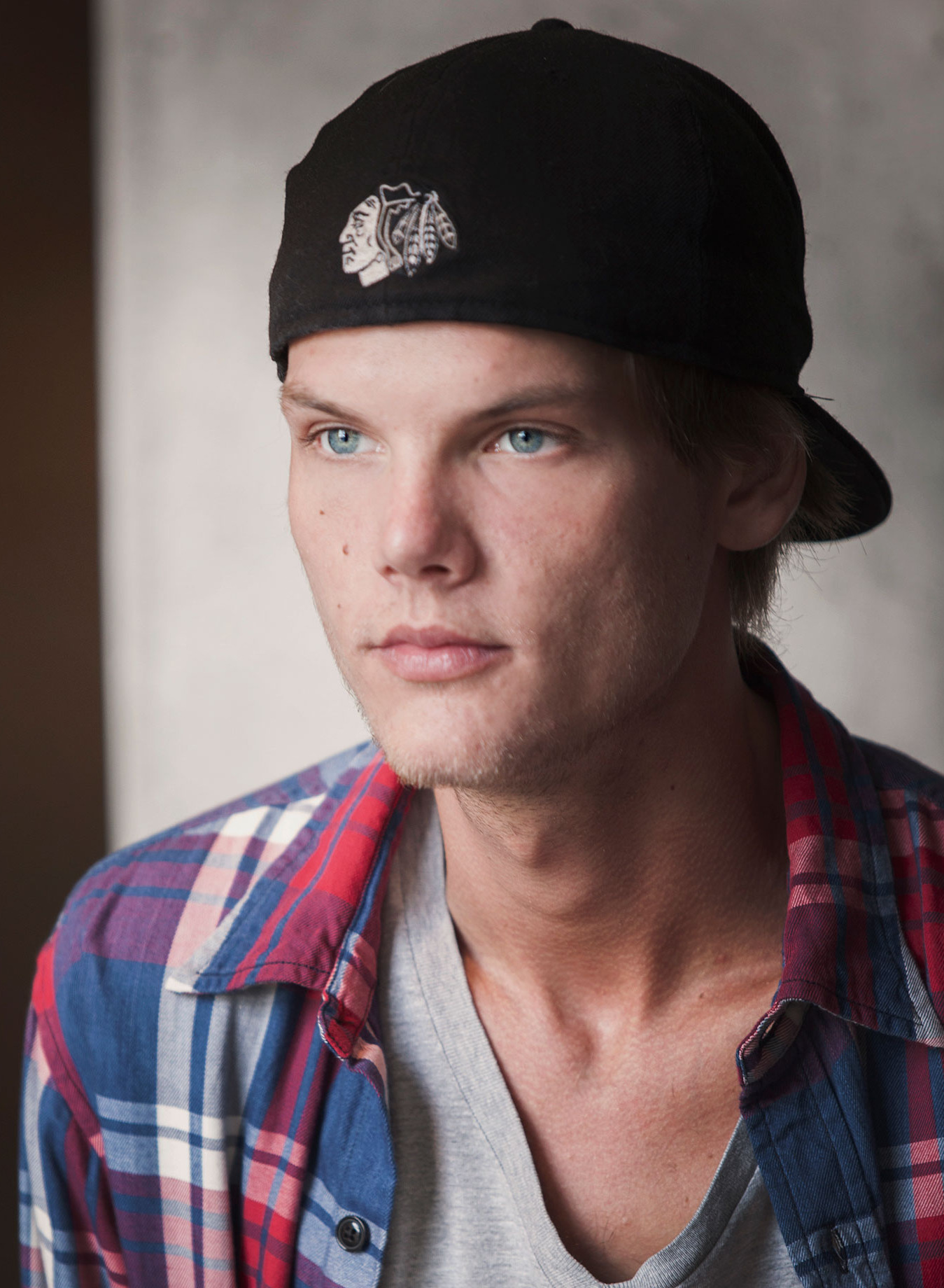
Basshunter influenced Avicii's music

As influences, he mentions listening to DJ Balloon and Rocco, and bands Warp Brothers and Snap!. He also listened to many underground tracks that had never been released or are not widely known by the general public, as well as German and Dutch techno music, trance, reggae, funk and blues music; particularly the music of Ray Charles. He considers Ali Payami as one of the best music producers, songwriters and DJ's. The first music release he bought is a single "The Way" by Fastball in the 1990s. He is fan of Robbie Williams. Basshunter's work has influenced Avicii, The Bird, Bladee, DCPA, Earmake Rasmus Gozzi, and Thaiboy Digital. CMAT, Johan Gunterberg from De Vet Du, Nordpolen, Sanna Martinez-Matz, Surf Mesa and Linda Thelenius like Basshunter's music. Blake Coppelson founder of Proximity, Stefán Finnbogason from Sykur and Throttle listen to Basshunter's music.

The first computer Basshunter used was the Atari ST. After achieving commercial success, he bought software to produce his music. Around 95% of his music is created with software, including digital audio workstations such as FL Studio, Logic Pro, Logic Studio, Pro Tools, Cubase, and Virtual Studio Technology plugins. He also plays guitar. He said stores buy an album for about 100 Swedish krona, of which he gets paid 12–13 percent. He said people think he listens to techno in his headphones all the time but he rarely listen to the music he produces, which gives him a wider perspective.

Basshunter considers his fan base to be very important for his career and knows many of his non-Scandinavian fans actually prefer his songs to be in Swedish. Writing in English may be an advantage for reaching international audiences but he has also said he likes the challenge of writing songs in English.

=== Live performances ===
Basshunter tries to plan the shows but actually presents his live performances as improvisations. In 2006, he performed seven times in one day, when he performed at shopping centres in Gothenburg and Malmö, and five nightclubs. He believes around 10% of Scandinavians or Swedes attend his concerts outside Sweden. Basshunter has performed at many festivals including Elämä lapselle (2006 and 2008), Hity Na Czasie twice in 2007 and 2009, T4 on the Beach (2010), Youth Beatz (2011), Allsång på Skansen (2012), Hull Pride (2012), Nottinghamshire Pride (2012), Emmabodafestivalen (2014 and 2017), The Gathering (2019) and Lundakarnevalen (2022).

In 2006, Basshunter performed during the Norway Cup. In 2009, he performed at the New Year's Eve party for the president of Kazakhstan Nursultan Nazarbayev and his family. He appeared on BBC Switch Live (2008) and in 2014 performed on Sochi Medals Plaza during the awards ceremony of Winter Olympic Games. Basshunter has performed on many tours, including New Zealand Tour (2009), Dance Nation Tour (2009 and 2010) and Australian Tour (2016).

=== Production, songwriting and remixes ===
Basshunter has remixed songs for a number of artists. In 2007 he released some remixes of singles; "Dancing Lasha Tumbai" by Verka Serduchka finished second in the Eurovision Song Contest 2007. "Du hast den schönsten Arsch der Welt" by Alex C. (featuring Y-ass) charted at number one in Austria and Germany. "Ieva's polka (Ievan polkka)" by Loituma also charted in Germany. He also released remix of "Calcutta 2008" for Dr. Bombay's compilation album The Hits. In 2008, Basshunter remixed Alina's song "When You Leave (Numa Numa)". In 2014, Basshunter remixed Sex Love Rock n Roll (SLR) by Arash (featuring T-Pain), which charted in Austria and Germany, and was released on Arash's album Superman. In 2015, he wrote "Mange kommer hem till dig" for the band Mange Makers. The single charted at number three on the Swedish Heatseeker chart. In 2020 he wrote "Shut Up Chicken" for El Capon and "Charlie" for Lana Scolaro. "Shut Up Chicken" appeared on the Russian and Polish airplay charts.

=== Music videos ===
Music videos for "Now You're Gone", "All I Ever Wanted", "Angel in the Night", "I Miss You", "Every Morning", "I Promised Myself", "Saturday" and "Northern Light" were directed by Alex Herron. His series of music videos with Aylar Lie received media attention. "Now You're Gone" became the most-viewed YouTube video in the United Kingdom in 2008 and the third-most-viewed YouTube video of 2009 with 65 million views. The music video for "Saturday" charted at number one in Poland.

== Other activities ==
=== Philanthropy ===
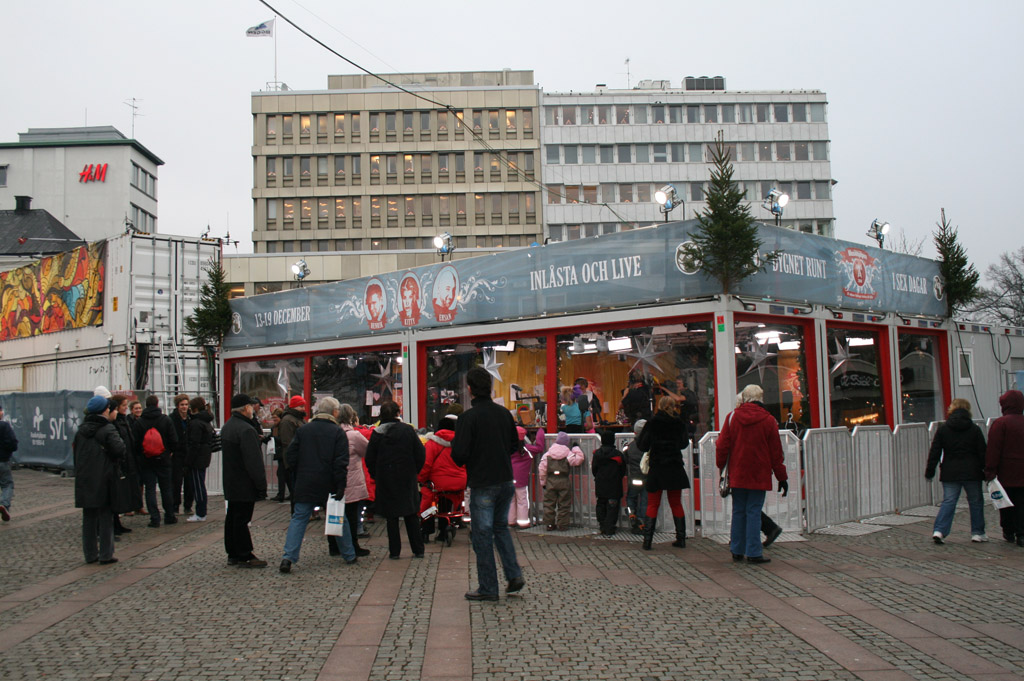
Musikhjälpen-house, Malmö, 2008

In 2008 and 2010, Basshunter appeared at the charity event Cash for Kids. He also appeared at the charity event Musikhjälpen in 2008. In February 2012, Norton Hill School's Quantock House organized a 20-hour charity sleep-over with Basshunter's song "Now You're Gone" playing non-stop, collecting more than £2,000 in the event to raise funds for the charities Time is Precious and Cancer Research UK. The event was repeated in 2015 with the same results.

=== Television and media ===
In 2009, Basshunter was a guest of television shows Red Bull Rivals and Never Mind the Buzzcocks. Starting in 2010, Basshunter took part in the seventh series of British Channel 4's Celebrity Big Brother as a housemate and finished in fourth place. He also appeared in the Swedish television game show Fångarna på fortet and in the British quiz show Weakest Link in 2010. In 2011 Basshunter's profile on Facebook was the most followed page among Swedish musicians with over 1,7 million followers. In 2015 his profile dropped to 4th place with over 2.9 million followers. In a 2017 Twitter poll, 92% of 57,814 voters said they would like Basshunter to become Prime Minister of the United Kingdom; 8% supported Theresa May.

=== Video games and films ===
Basshunter finished second place in a Swedish StarCraft tournament. He played Counter-Strike at semi-professional level and his clan won two tournaments in Sweden. He appeared during the Danmarks Bedste Gamer in 2008 and during The Gathering in 2019. After achieving commercial success, he could not publish songs as free downloads and started producing vlogs for YouTube. He initially planned to release a continuation of LOL album titled either ROFL or KTHXBYE for free but was unable to after signing with a record label. In 2011, Basshunter appeared in the film Playing with Arnold, in which he invites people to play the video game Mortal Online. Basshunter appeared in Arash's music video for "Melody". In 2021, he appeared in a promotional video, titled Basshunter Dota Revival for the Netflix series Dota: Dragon's Blood, performing "DotA" whilst playing Dota 2. In 2023, he said he no longer plays DotA due to reaction time at his age.

== Legal issues ==
On 10 December 2010, Scotland's Fife Constabulary charged Basshunter over a sexual assault allegation made by two female fans during a party at a nightclub in Kirkcaldy. He was released on bail. His manager said the allegations were "totally untrue". Basshunter pleaded not guilty to two charges of sexual assault against the two women at a hearing at the town's court on 12 January 2011. On 14 June 2011, he was found not guilty, with the sheriff describing his accusers as "neither credible nor reliable" and their testimony as "riddled with inconsistencies and improbabilities".

== Personal life ==
During their time together on the British reality television show Celebrity Big Brother in 2010, Basshunter and Kazakhstani-born Russian model Ekaterina Ivanova began an intimate relationship. He began dating Tina Makhia Khayatsadeh in 2014, and they were married on 19 January 2017 at the Dubai Polo & Equestrian Club in the presence of his brother Joakim, his manager Henrik Uhlmann, Iranian-Swedish singer Arash, Polish singer Margaret, Swedish diplomat Jan Thesleff, Warner Music Sweden chief executive officer Jonas Siljemark. The couple divorced after a year. He has stated he did not enjoy life as a married man and described the need to numb his emotions with work and alcohol.

Basshunter has Tourette syndrome and has described himself as a spontaneous person, though he has also said he has a sensitive side.

== Awards and nominations ==
During his career, Basshunter has won several awards including Musikförläggarnas pris (2006) and NRJ Radio Award (2007). His debut album LOL was nominated for Emma, Grammis and won the European Border Breakers Award. Single "Boten Anna" was nominated for Rockbjörnen and won Eurodanceweb Award and Telia awards. Basshunter's song "Now You're Gone" won an Eska Music Award and was nominated for an MTV Europe Music Award. "Every Morning" was nominated for International Dance Music Award.

== Discography ==
- The Bassmachine (2004)
- LOL (2006)
- Now You're Gone – The Album (2008)
- Bass Generation (2009)
- Calling Time (2013)
