= Carl-Johan Westregård =

Swedish director and visual effects artist

Carl-Johan Westregård (born 7 November 1984) is a Swedish film director and visual effects artist. His short film Cams premiered at the 71st Venice International Film Festival and was awarded the Special Jury Prize in the Lab Competition of the 2015 Clermont-Ferrand International Short Film Festival.

== Videography ==
=== As lead artist ===
List of music videos as director
Title	Year	Artist(s)	Ref.
"Boten Anna"	2006	Basshunter	
"Vi sitter i Ventrilo och spelar DotA"	2006	Basshunter	
