= Gebroeders Ko =

Dutch musical duo

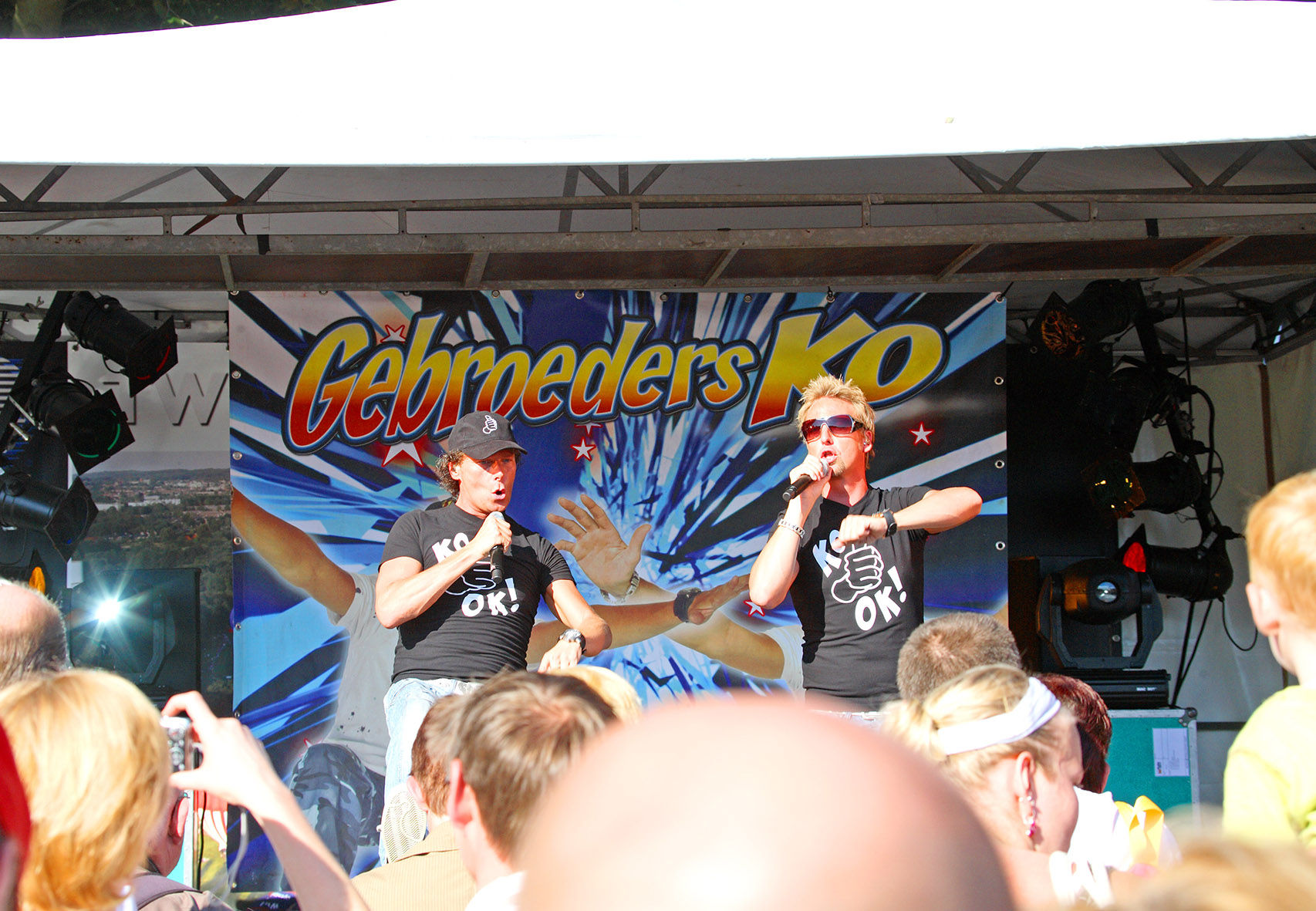
Gebroeders Ko, 2008.

Gebroeders Ko is a Dutch musical duo, consisting of the brothers Ton and Gerard Koopmans. Their name literally means "The Ko Brothers" and they are known for their Dutch spoofs of "Boten Anna" by Basshunter and "Dragostea Din Tei" by O-Zone.

Their 2007 single "Duiken in de zee" is based on the melody of Funiculì, Funiculà, a famous Italian song written by Luigi Denza in 1880.

They have made a single "Vuvuzela" named after the South African instrument vuvuzela for the 2010 FIFA World Cup which was held in South Africa.

Songs of Gebroeders Ko not only became famous in the Netherlands but also within the German Mallorca scenery. German versions recorded by Mickie Krause were hits in all German speaking countries.

== Discography ==
=== Albums ===
==== Studio albums ====
List of studio albums with selected chart positions
Title	Album details	Peak chart positions
Title	Album details	NLD
Villa fiesta	Released: 2003; Label: Berk Music; Format: CD	45
Gorgelende kelen	Released: 2004; Label: Berk Music; Format: CD	37
Vet Coole Pepernoten	Released: 2006; Label: Berk Music; Format: CD	—
Feestje bouwen	Released: 22 January 2010; Label: Berk Music; Format: CD	92
"—" denotes a recording that did not chart or was not released in that territory.

==== Compilation albums ====
List of compilation albums with selected chart positions
Title	Album details	Peak chart positions
Title	Album details	NLD
Knallers	Released: 2006; Label: Berk Music; Format: CD+DVD	36
Dubbel Ko	Released: 2008; Label: Berk Music; Format: CD	92
Dag Sinterklaasje	Released: 22 October 2009; Label: Berk Music Productions; Format: Digital download	—
Ko & Ko - De Grootste Hits	Released: 2011; Label: Berk Music; Format: 2×CD	—
Sinterklaas Hits	Released: 4 October 2013; Label: Berk Music Productions; Format: Digital download	—
"—" denotes a recording that did not chart or was not released in that territory.

==== Video albums ====
List of video albums with selected chart positions
Title	Album details	Peak chart positions
Title	Album details	NLD
Toeter Enzo!	Released: 2005; Label: Berk Music; Format: DVD	—
Feestje bouwen!	Released: 2009; Label: Berk Music; Format: DVD	23
"—" denotes a recording that did not chart or was not released in that territory.

=== Singles ===
==== As lead artist ====
List of singles as lead artist with selected chart positions
Title	Year	Peak chart positions	
Title	Year	NLD	BEL (FL)
"Broodje frikandel"	2006	8	—
"Daar word ik niet vrolijk van!!" (feat. Rob Geus)	2006	66	—
"Boten Anna"	2006	3	8
"Sinterklaas boot (Boten Anna)"	2006	2	—
"RoeKoeKoe"	2007	32	—
"Arend Kan Alles"	2007	—	—
"Zwaai maar dag Sinterklaasje"	2007	18	—
"Duiken in de zee"	2007	12	—
"Wienerschnitzel"	2008	57	—
"Vreemdgaan doet iedereen"	2008	21	—
"Schatje, mag ik je foto?"	2008	10	—
"De Knippieten"	2008	84	—
"Nie prate nie & nie zinge nie"	2008	7	—
"Wil jij wat van mij drinken"	2009	17	—
"Vuvuzela"	2009	13	—
"Geef mij de sleutel van jouw voordeur"	2010	3	—
"Helikopter"	2010	11	—
"Helikopter (Karnavalesk)"	2011	10	—
"Wunderbar!" (feat. Walter & Hüber)	2011	6	—
"Vandaag gaat het gebeuren"	2011	—	—
"Sinterklaas in een raket" (with Joris en Boris)	2011	6	—
"Één bitterbal"	2012	14	—
"Oranje springt" (feat. Factor12)	2012	9	—
"Toeter op m'n waterscooter 2012"	2012	92	—
"De blauwe stier" (feat. DJ Willem de Wijs & Feest DJ Bas & Factor 12)	2012	4	—
"Koning pils"	2013	6	—
"Ik ben verliefd, maar niet op jou"	2013	25	—
"Ich liebe Ananas"	2013	—	—
"Niet uit Volendam"	2013	52	—
"Drink als een prins" (with La Bamba)	2014	7	—
"Voor oranje"	2014	35	—
"Wat heb jij een lekker lijf"	2014	61	—
"Wat heb jij een lekker lijf (Goldfinger Remix)"	2014	69	—
"Ik wil alleen maar jou"	2015	—	—
"Logeren"	2015	—	—
"Bij ons Omi's"	2015	—	—
"Wij gaan op wintersport"	2015	—	—
"Kom maar in mijn kano"	2016	—	—
"Het leven is als een frikandel"	2016	—	—
"Haar naam is Lola"	2016	—	—
"Daar komt ie weer Daan" (and Stichting Kielegat)	2016	—	—
"Daar komt ie weer aan Daan"	2016	—	—
"Wij slaan nooit een feestje over"	2017	—	—
"Zomerzon"	2017	—	—
"Mijn Stamcafe"	2017	—	—
"Dochter van de Groenteboer" (ft. Gerard Joling)	2018	—	—
"Gij ben aan de beurt"	2018	—	—
"Gij ben aan de beurt (Barry Fest Remix)"	2018	—	—
"Een atje voor de sfeer" (feat. Nickelbass)	2018	—	—
"Oktoberfest (Polka Version)"	2018	—	—
"Schatje mag ik je foto (Dr. Rude & 2nd Bass Remix)"	2019	—	—
"Oh wat is dit mooi"	2019	—	—
"Met de neus omhoog"	2019	—	—
"Waar is de paracetamol"	2019	—	—
"Tringeling 2.0"	2020	—	—
"BBQ"	2021	—	—
"Ja wie niet springt (die moet betalen)"	2021	—	—
"Ja wie niet springt (die moet betalen) [Special Krew Remix]"	2022	—	—
"Happy Days Are Here Again"	2022	—	—
"—" denotes a recording that did not chart or was not released in that country.

==== As featured artist ====
List of singles as featured artist, with selected chart positions
Title	Year	Peak chart positions
Title	Year	GER
"Wijdoen het licht wel uit" (Fritske)	2007	—
"Schatzi, schenk mir ein Foto!" (Mickie Krause)	2011	27
"Helikopter" (Markus Becker)	2011	52
