= Welcome to Rainbow =

Single by Basshunter
- Released: 1 April 2006
- Length: 18:53
- Label: Self-released

Basshunter singles chronology
"The Big Show" (2004)	"Welcome to Rainbow" (2006)	"Boten Anna" (2006)

Audio sample
- Welcome to Rainbow (Hardstyle Remix): file; help

Audio video
- "Welcome to Rainbow" Now You're Gone – The Album version on YouTube

"Welcome to Rainbow" is the song by Swedish musician Basshunter. It was self-released as single by Basshunter on 1 April 2006. "Welcome to Rainbow" comprises four tracks, which were re-released on subsequent Basshunter studio albums.

== Background and release ==
Basshunter announced the release of "Welcome to Rainbow" on 20 December 2005. Ultimately he self-released it in Sweden on 1 April 2006. Basshunter wrote the lyrics and music; Fredrik Jansson mastered the songs. The artwork was produced by Djb Design.

The single contains four tracks which last 18 minutes and 53 seconds. The first two tracks are "Welcome to Rainbow" and its hardstyle remix, which is the longest track on this release lasting five minutes and 29 seconds. The remaining two tracks, "Evil Beat" and "Boten Anna", are a bonus tracks. "Evil Beat" is the shortest track at three minutes and 30 seconds.

Basshunter initially published his song "Boten Anna" online in March 2006. Within twenty-four hours, the song was downloaded an estimated 37,000 times. With this success, Basshunter received several proposals from music labels. In April 2006, he signed with Extensive Music and Warner Music Sweden, and on 9 May 2006, a shorter version of "Boten Anna" was released as a single. It was later included on Basshunter's second studio album LOL (2006). According to information published on 8 June 2006, the song had been downloaded an estimated over one million times. "Evil Beat" was renamed "The Beat" and released as a reissue on LOL. New versions of "Welcome to Rainbow" and its hardstyle remix (renamed "Hardstyle Drops"), alongside the single version of "Boten Anna" appear on his fourth studio album Now You're Gone – The Album (2008). In 2020 a fragment of the "Welcome to Rainbow" was played on the radio programme P3 Musikdokumentär broadcast by Sveriges Radio.

== Track listing ==
CD-R
No.	Title	Writer(s)	Length
1.	"Welcome to Rainbow" (Original Mix)	Jonas Altberg	5:06
2.	"Welcome to Rainbow" (Hardstyle Remix)	Altberg	5:29
3.	"Evil Beat" (Bonus Track)	Altberg	3:30
4.	"Boten Anna" (Bonus Track)	Altberg	4:48
Total length:			18:53

== Personnel ==
Credits

- Basshunter – music and lyrics
- Fredrik Jansson – mastering
- Djb Design – artwork

== Release history ==
Country	Date	Format	Label
Sweden	1 April 2006	CD-R	Self-released
Denmark	12 June 2006	Unknown	Unknown
