= Pocket TV (series) =

British YouTube television series

Pocket TV is a British music and entertainment show made by Sony Ericsson and shot in HD. Series one launched in June 2009 and ran for 13 weeks on YouTube. The show achieved over 2.5 million views. The first series was presented by Matt Edmondson and Jameela Jamil. They hosted segments which included Face Invaders, Quiz my pants and live sessions. The show gave viewers the opportunity to submit ideas and to host Citizen Journalist features including Underground Rebel Bingo Club, The Hide & Seek festival and Welsh music club night Swaparama.

== Series 2 ==
The second series of Pocket TV ran for 13 weeks starting April 2010. It was presented by Matt Edmondson and available on YouTube, MSN and the PlayStation Network in the United Kingdom and Ireland. In July 2010, Channel 4 purchased the rights to broadcast the show on T4 and 4Music, starting from August 2010.
