= Home (Basshunter song) =

Single by Basshunter
- Released: 27 September 2019
- Genre: Progressive house
- Length: 3:03
- Label: Artistars; PowerHouse; Roton; Teta Records; Warner Music Russia; Warner Music Sweden; Yeni Dünya Müzik
- Songwriters: Cedric Lorrain; Javier Gonzalez; Basshunter; Linnea Deb; Robert Uhlmann; Thomas G:son
- Producer: Jakob Redze

Basshunter singles chronology
"Masterpiece" (2018)	"Home" (2019)	"Angels Ain't Listening" (2020)

Audio sample
- file; help

Lyric video
- "Home" on YouTube

"Home" is a song by Swedish musician Basshunter. The single was released on 27 September 2019 by Artistars, PowerHouse, Roton, Teta Records, Warner Music Russia, Warner Music Sweden and Yeni Dünya Müzik. "Home" was written by Cedric Lorrain, Javier Gonzalez, Basshunter, Linnea Deb, Robert Uhlmann and Thomas G:son, and produced by Jakob Redze. The single peaked at number 5 on British Commercial Pop chart.

== Background and release ==
After almost five years since the release of "Elinor", Basshunter released his new single "Masterpiece" on 18 October 2018. On 20 August 2019 Basshunter announced that a new single would be released soon and revealed that its name was "Home". On 14 October Basshunter played the song live in a nightclub in Edinburgh and later announced that the new single would be released in two weeks.

"Home" was released on 27 September 2019 by Artistars, PowerHouse, Roton, Teta Records, Warner Music Russia, Warner Music Sweden and Yeni Dünya Müzik. The audio was published by Warner Music Sweden the next day. The song is three minutes and three seconds long. The idea for the song originated during Powerhouse's yearly song writing camp held in Dubai. "Home" was written by Cedric Lorrain, Javier Gonzalez, Basshunter, Linnea Deb, Robert Uhlmann and Thomas G:son, and produced by Jakob Redze with vocals by Linnea Deb. A lyric video for "Home" directed by Jay Vasquez was published by Basshunter on 10 October 2019. Animated film depicts Basshunter's positive outlook on life without negativity and revenge. "Angels Ain't Listening" is the next single released on 29 May 2020.

== Reception ==
The release of "Home" was covered by the media. An editor from Scandipop said that the song is a throwback to the bounce music of the 2000s, elevated by a pop chorus followed by a huge instrumental post-chorus; the song was also included on Scandipop's Best New Pop playlist on Spotify. Mandy Rogers from EQ Music emphasized that "Home" is made in Basshunter's style, is produced like europop music, and is softer in comparison to his earlier songs. Football journalist Richard Buxton said that the song "could've done with a bit more work". The release of Basshunter's new single was also spotted by Allstarz.ee, Official Charts, Radio Eska, Top 40 and Top Playlists. The track was also added to the Swedish top download and stream playlist on 4 October 2019.

== Track listing ==
Digital download, streaming (27 September 2019)
No.	Title	Length
1.	"Home"	3:03

== Personnel ==
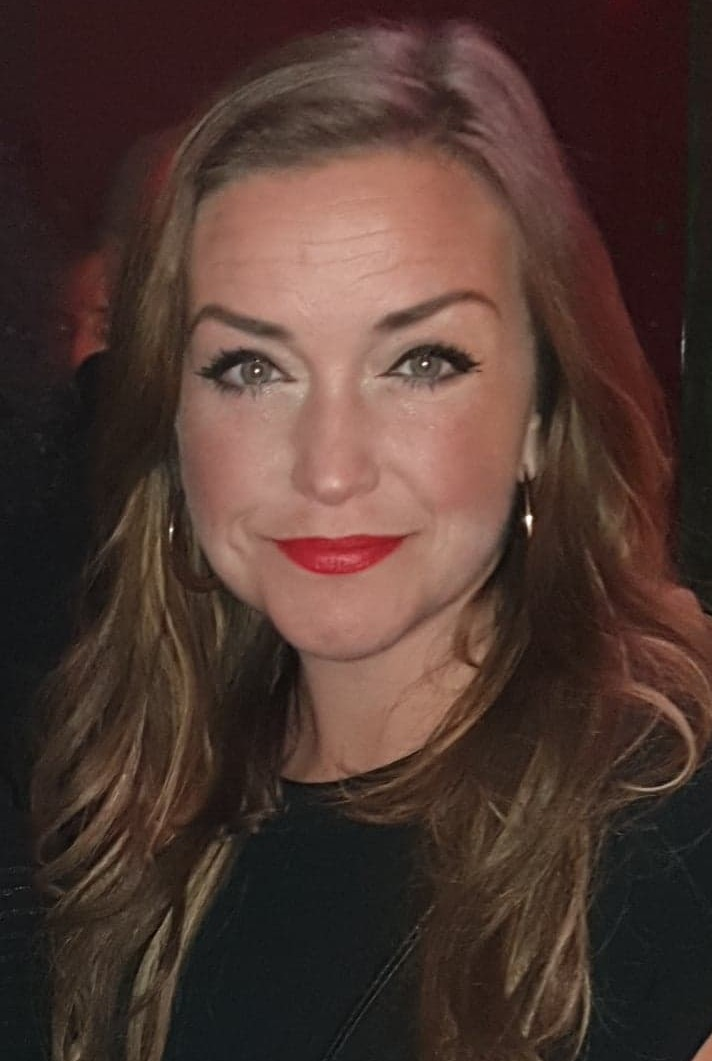
Linnea Deb has made vocals on "Home".

Credits

- Composer, lyricist – Cedric Lorrain, Javier Gonzalez, Basshunter, Linnea Deb, Robert Uhlmann, Thomas G:son
- Vocalist – Linnea Deb

== Charts ==
Weekly chart performance for "Home"
Chart (2019)	Peak position
United Kingdom (Commercial Pop)	5

== Release history ==
Date	Format	Label
27 September 2019	Digital download; streaming	Artistars; PowerHouse; Roton; Teta Records; Warner Music Russia; Warner Music Sweden; Yeni Dünya Müzik
4 October 2019	Digital download	Down2Earth Music
