= Northern Light (song) =

Single by Basshunter

from the album Calling Time
- Released: May 2012
- Recorded: 2011–2012
- Genre: Dance
- Length: 2:50 (radio edit)
- Label: All Around the World; 3Beat Productions; Extensive Music; Ultra; Warner Dance Labels; Roton; Magic
- Songwriters: Basshunter; Minna Benne Elo; Marcus Wickstrom
- Producer: Basshunter

Basshunter singles chronology
"Fest i hela huset" (2011)	"Northern Light" (2012)	"Dream on the Dancefloor" (2012)

Music video
- "Northern Light" on YouTube

"Northern Light" is a song by Swedish musician Basshunter, which appears on his fifth studio album, Calling Time.

== Music video ==
Music video was directed by Alex Herron and uploaded by All Around the World on 27 April 2012.

== Reception ==
Lucy Jones from NME mentioned "Northern Light" by Basshunter as one of the songs inspired by northern lights.

== Live performances ==
Basshunter perform "Northern Light" on 12 May 2012 at Maspalomas Pride 2012, his performance was recorded and released on the box set various artists. Artist singing "Northern Light" and "Boten Anna" on 4 July 2012 at Allsång på Skansen in Stockholm.

== Track listing ==
- Promo CD (May 2012)
1. "Northern Light" (Radio Edit) – 2:50
2. "Northern Light" (Original Mix) – 3:10
3. "Northern Light" (Club Mix) – 5:18
4. "Northern Light" (Almighty Remix Edit) – 3:30
5. "Northern Light" (Almighty Remix) – 6:07
6. "Northern Light" (Almighty Remix Dub) – 6:07
7. "Northern Light" (PJ Harmony Remix Edit) – 4:18
8. "Northern Light" (PJ Harmony Remix) – 6:04
- Promo CD (2012)
1. "Northern Light" (Original Mix) – 3:10
2. "Northern Light" (Radio Edit) – 2:50
3. "Northern Light" (Club Mix) – 5:18
4. "Northern Light" (PJ Harmony Remix) – 4:18
5. "Northern Light" (Almighty Remix) – 3:30
6. "Northern Light" (Almighty Remix Edit) – 6:07
7. "Northern Light" (Almighty Remix Dub) – 6:07
8. "Northern Light" (PJ Harmony Remix Edit) – 4:04
- Digital download (2 October 2012)
1. "Northern Light" (KleptoMaddox Dubstep Remix) – 3:46
- Remixes
1. "Northern Light" (Original Mix) – 3:10
2. "Northern Light" (De Rossi Radio Mix) – 2:49
3. "Northern Light" (De Rossi Club Mix) – 5:18
4. "Northern Light" (PJ Harmony Remix) – 4:18
5. "Northern Light" (Almighty Remix) – 3:30
6. "Northern Light" (Almighty Remix Edit) – 6:07
7. "Northern Light" (Almighty Remix Dub) – 6:07
8. "Northern Light" (PJ Harmony Remix Edit) – 4:04

== Charts ==
Weekly chart performance for "Northern Light"
Chart (2012)	Peak position
United Kingdom (Commercial Pop Top 30)	7
United Kingdom (Upfront Club Top 40)	14

== Release history ==
Country	Date	Format	Label
United Kingdom	May 2012	Promo CD	3Beat Productions
Sweden	2012	Promo CD	Warner Dance Labels
United States	2 October 2012	Digital download	Ultra Records
