= Shut Up Chicken =

Single by El Capon
- Released: 10 January 2020
- Length: 2:30
- Label: Jo&Co; Kontor Records
- Songwriters: Basshunter; Claydee; Thomas Jules; Ilkay Sencan

"Shut Up Chicken" is a song by El Capon, released as a single on 10 January 2020 by Jo&Co. "Shut Up Chicken" was written by Basshunter, Claydee, Thomas Jules and Ilkay Sencan. It was written during a writing session of the PowerHouse label in Dubai.

A music video for "Shut Up Chicken" was directed by Fabrice Begotti and was published on El Capon channel on 10 January 2020. "Shut Up Chicken" received support from David Guetta, Lost Frequencies, Hardwell and other artists. El Capon performed song during the Les Douze Coups de midi and La Chanson de l'année on TF1.

== Track listing ==
Digital download (10 January 2020)
| No. | Title | Length |
|---|---|---|
| 1. | "Shut Up Chicken" (Radio Edit) | 2:30 |

Digital download – Remixes (5 June 2020)
| No. | Title | Length |
|---|---|---|
| 1. | "Shut Up Chicken" (Laureano Remix) | 2:47 |
| 2. | "Shut Up Chicken" (Antrox Remix) | 2:58 |
| 3. | "Shut Up Chicken" (Benji of Sweden Remix) | 3:36 |
| 4. | "Shut Up Chicken" (Just Ben Remix) | 3:30 |
| 5. | "Shut Up Chicken" (Extended Mix) | 4:38 |

== Charts ==
=== Weekly charts ===
Weekly chart performance for "Shut Up Chicken"
| Chart (2020–2021) | Peak position |
|---|---|
| Belgium (Ultratip Bubbling Under Wallonia) | 22 |
| France (Classement Radio) | 59 |
| Poland (Airplay – Top) | 37 |
| Russia (Top City & Country Radio Hits) | 9 |

=== Year-end charts ===
Yearly chart performance for "Shut Up Chicken"
| Chart (2020) | Position |
|---|---|
| CIS (Tophit) | 78 |
