= Masterpiece (Basshunter song) =

Single by Basshunter
- Released: 19 October 2018
- Genre: Big room house
- Length: 2:46
- Label: PowerHouse; Extensive Music LJT; Ultra Records; Warner Music Sweden
- Songwriters: Alex Argento; Basshunter; Robert Uhlmann
- Producers: Alex Argento; Basshunter; Robert Uhlmann

Basshunter singles chronology
"Elinor" (2013)	"Masterpiece" (2018)	"Home" (2019)

Audio sample
- file; help

Lyric video
- "Masterpiece" on YouTube

"Masterpiece" is a song by Swedish musician Basshunter. The single was released on 19 October 2018 by PowerHouse, Extensive Music LJT, Ultra Records and Warner Music Sweden. It is notable for including in-game audio from the multiplayer online battle arena League of Legends. "Masterpiece" was written and produced by Alex Argento, Basshunter and Robert Uhlmann.

== Background and release ==
Basshunter announced on 3 January 2018 that a new single would be released soon. Four days later, he published a fragment of the song played in the studio. In June and July, in interviews for Westmeath Independent and The Overtake, Basshunter revealed that the single would be titled "Masterpiece". Basshunter announced on 3 October that the single would be released by Ultra Records on 19 October 2018. A trailer for the song was published on 11 October 2018.

"Masterpiece" was released on 19 October 2018 by PowerHouse, Extensive Music LJT, Ultra Records and Warner Music Sweden. A lyric video for "Masterpiece" was published by Ultra Music on the same day. Warner Music Sweden announced a Stream & Steam contest in which the winner would receive a Steam gift card.

Basshunter played "Masterpiece" as the closing song at shows. His manager Scott Simons said that the reaction from the audience was overwhelmingly positive. Basshunter said that "Masterpiece" is different from his previous songs "Boten Anna" and "Vi sitter i Ventrilo och spelar DotA", for which he is known in Sweden. In 2019 Den Sorte Skole played "Masterpiece" live during Smukfest in Skanderborg. In 2021 Basshunter played the song live during Øresound Festival in Copenhangen.

The song uses in-game audio of League of Legends' characters Sona and Brand. Basshunter claimed this was to draw attention to the importance of gamers at the early stages of his career. He has also played League of Legends.

The song has a tempo of 132 beats per minute and is written in the key of F minor. "Masterpiece" was written and produced by Alex Argento, Basshunter and Robert Uhlmann.

== Reception ==
The release of "Masterpiece" was covered by media including Aftonbladet, CelebMix, Festivalrykten, Gaffa, Hänt, Hallandsposten, Mynewsdesk, Nyheter24, Official Charts Company, Top 40, and Veckorevyn. The song was named one of the best releases of the week by editors of the Turkish Apple Music store. Masterpiece charted on DJ list in Germany. It also become the seventh best-selling song of the week in the Euro Dance/Pop Dance category, and fifteenth in the EDM category, in the Juno Download store.

== Track listing ==
Digital download, streaming (19 October 2018)
No.	Title	Length
1.	"Masterpiece"	2:46

Digital download (15 December 2018)
No.	Title	Length
1.	"Masterpiece (Remix)" (featuring Basshunter)	2:51

== Personnel ==
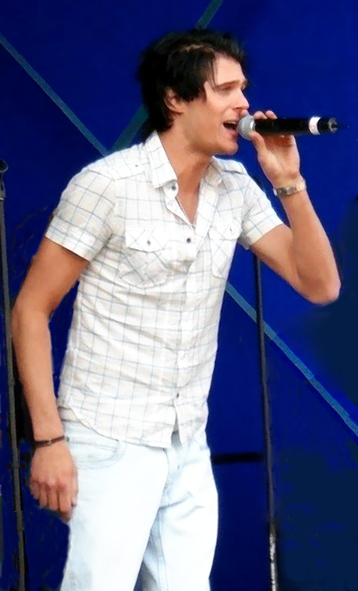
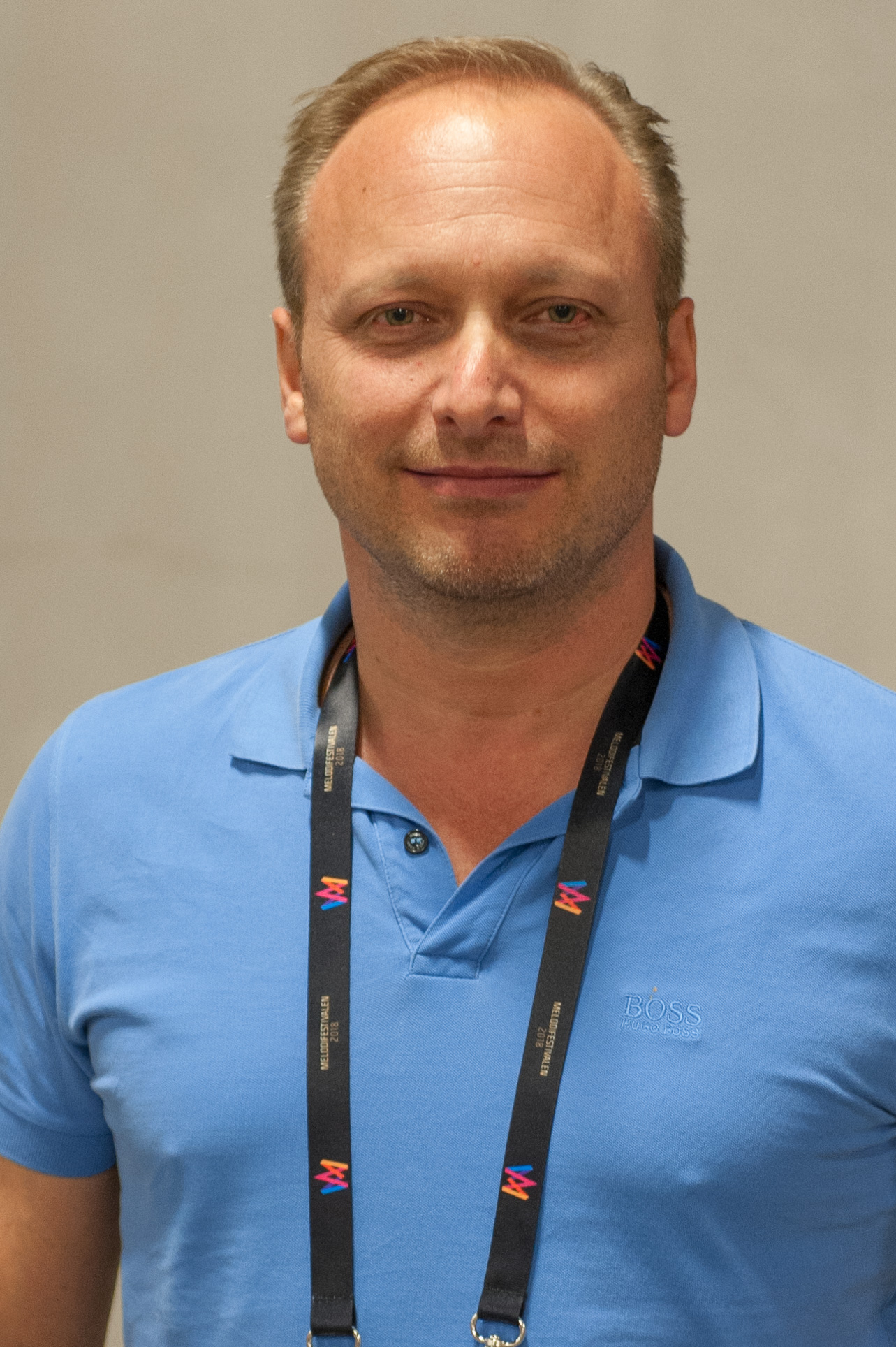
Swedish musician Basshunter (left) and Swedish music producer Robert Uhlmann written and produced "Masterpiece" with Alex Argento.

Credits

- Alex Argento – writer, producer
- Basshunter – writer, producer
- Robert Uhlmann – writer, producer, mastering engineer, mixing engineer

== Charts ==
2018 weekly chart performance for "Masterpiece"
Chart (2018)	Peak position
Germany (Dance-Charts Top 100)	42
Germany (Deutsche-DJ-Playlist)	25

2019 weekly chart performance for "Masterpiece"
Chart (2019)	Peak position
Germany (Dance50 Chart)	28
Germany (Die Deutschen Disco Chart)	3
Germany (Deutsche Pop Chart)	3
Germany (Die Offiziellen Deutschen Party & Schlager Chart)	39

== Release history ==
Date	Format	Label
19 October 2018	Digital download; streaming	PowerHouse; Extensive Music LJT; Ultra Records; Warner Music Sweden
15 December 2018	Digital download; streaming	Init
