= Elinor (song) =

Single by Basshunter
- Released: 20 November 2013
- Genre: Dance
- Length: 3:09
- Label: Rush Hour; Ultra Records
- Songwriter: Basshunter
- Producer: Basshunter

Basshunter singles chronology
"Calling Time" (2013)	"Elinor" (2013)	"Masterpiece" (2018)

Audio video
- "Elinor" on YouTube

Elinor is a song written and produced by Swedish musician Basshunter, released as a single on 20 November 2013, by Rush Hour.

== Background ==
On 26 July 2013, Basshunter announced he was retiring from singing to focus on DJing, producing, and songwriting, however his sixth single "Calling Time" from the album of the same name, was released on 27 September 2013. "Elinor" was released on 20 November 2013 by Rush Hour, being released as a single by Ultra Records on 17 December, and is a 3 minute and nine second-long dance song with a tempo of 145 beats per minute in the key of A minor. "Elinor" was written and produced by Basshunter. In 2016, Basshunter returned to recording and his next single "Masterpiece" was released on 19 October 2018, almost five years after "Elinor" was released.

In 2016, during an interview with Basshunter, Per Kågström from Göteborgs-Posten said it is strange that Basshunter sings many of his songs in Swedish abroad. Basshunter replied that the audience knows the lyrics anyway. In 2021 Basshunter played "Elinor" live during the Øresound Festival in Copenhangen. also playing in the Trädgår'n arena in Gothenburg and editor from Göteborgs-Posten considered this to be the best aspect of the Basshunter concert.

== Track listing ==
Digital download (20 November 2013), streaming
No.	Title	Writer(s)	Producer(s)	Length
1.	"Elinor"	Jonas Altberg	Altberg	3:09
