= Calling Time (song) =

Single by Basshunter

from the album Calling Time
- Released: 27 September 2013
- Genre: Eurodance
- Label: Balloon Records; Central Station; Magic Records; Mas Label; Empo
- Songwriters: Basshunter; Scott Simons
- Producers: Basshunter; Scott Simons

Basshunter singles chronology
"Crash & Burn" (2013)	"Calling Time" (2013)	"Elinor" (2013)

Music video
- "Calling Time" on YouTube

"Calling Time" is a song by Swedish musician Basshunter, which appears on his five studio album about this same title. The single was released on 27 September 2013.

== Background and release ==
Basshunter performed "Calling Time" in June 2011. In 2012 the video promoting the album about this same title, Basshunter in Magaluf !! – Featuring – Dream on the Dance Floor include "Calling Time" has been released. In March 2013, Basshunter uploaded demo of the "Calling Time". Song has been released on Calling Time on 13 May. On 24 June the release of single has been confirmed. The video promoting album, Basshunter – Calling Time // Album Snippet Mix released on 30 July included fragment of song. The single has been released on 27 September, as sixth single from album.

== Track listing ==
- Digital download (27 September 2013)
1. "Calling Time" (Album Edit) – 3:03
2. "Calling Time" (Extended Mix) – 4:03
3. "Calling Time" (Dawson & Creek Remix) – 5:04
4. "Calling Time" (Josh Williams Mix) – 6:30
5. "Calling Time" (Nitra M Remix) – 4:38

== Release history ==
Country	Date	Format	Label
Austria, Germany	27 September 2013	Digital download	Balloon Records
Poland	9 October 2013	Digital download	Magic Records
Australia, New Zealand	25 October 2013	Digital download	Central Station
Mexico	12 November 2013	Digital download	Mas Label and Empo

== Music video ==
Music video has been confirmed on 24 June 2013. On 7 July 2013, the music video was shot at Project X Boat Party.

Music video was directed by Gareth Evans and uploaded by Basshunter on 6 August.
