= Calling Time =

Studio album by Basshunter
- Released: 13 May 2013
- Genre: EDM; trance; eurodance; dance-pop
- Length: 58:42
- Label: Gallo Record Company; Warner Music Sweden; Broma 16; Rush Hour

Basshunter chronology
The Early Bedroom Sessions (2012)	Calling Time (2013)

Singles from Calling Time
- 1. "Saturday" Released: 5 July 2010; 2. "Fest i hela huset" Released: 20 April 2011; 3. "Northern Light" Released: May 2012; 4. "Dream on the Dancefloor" Released: 18 November 2012; 5. "Crash & Burn" Released: 20 June 2013; 6. "Calling Time" Released: 27 September 2013

Calling Time is the fifth studio album by Swedish musician Basshunter. It was released on 13 May 2013.

== Background and release ==
Basshunter started working on the album in October 2010. It was announced that the album will feature the single "Saturday", released 5 July 2010. It was initially planned that the album would be released in early 2011. In April 2011, the Basshunter recorded with the participants of the Swedish edition of Big Brother, "Fest i hela huset". In the same month, it was announced that Basshunter was working with Kerry Katona on a new song entitled "You're Not Alone". During live performances in June 2011, Basshunter performed two songs from the album: "Calling Time" and "Dream on the Dancefloor". In July, the artist announced that the album will be a mix of different genres of music, including trance.

In early 2012, Basshunter released demos preluding the album, which included early versions of "Dirty" (titled as "Dirty Dancefloor"), and "Lawnmower to Music" (titled as "The Art of Transformation"). The "I Will Never Turn Around", "All the People" and "My Flesh and Blood" tracks that were uploaded online never made it to the final track listing of the album. On 21 April 2012, Basshunter premiered the single, "Northern Light". In July 2012, Bashunter announced that the album will feature new versions of track "Sandra (I Don't Wanna Be Alone)" and "Elinor" and the new song "Open Your Eyes". On 18 November 2012, the single, "Dream on the Dancefloor" was released. In January 2013, Techno4ever.FM, Vol.1 compilation album was released including a track from the new album titled as "Far Far Away".

In February 2013, Basshunter recorded new songs with the members of Ultrabeat. In March 2013, he released four songs from the new album, which included the demo version of "Calling Time" and "Open My Eyes". Basshunter announced the album release would be postponed because he wanted to do something new and different from before, and to get to new fans. In early May 2013, the album's cover and the title was revealed. Basshunter announced that it he had recorded over 30 tracks and demos and had to select the final 15 that would feature on the album.

== Track listing ==
Calling Time
No.	Title	Writer(s)	Producer(s)	Length
1.	"Dirty" (featuring Sandra)	Jonas Altberg; Sandra Gundstedt	Jonas Altberg	2:53
2.	"Crash & Burn"	Adam Baptiste; Altberg	Altberg	3:09
3.	"Dream on the Dancefloor" (Radio Edit)	Altberg; Scott Simons; Paul Kominek	Altberg; Simons	3:12
4.	"Calling Time"	Altberg; Simons	Altberg; Simons	3:07
5.	"Far Away"	Eric Vyskocil; Paul Hutsch	Altberg	3:42
6.	"Rise My Love"	Altberg	Altberg	2:33
7.	"I've Got You Now"	Altberg	Altberg	3:11
8.	"You're Not Alone"	Altberg; Maja	Altberg; Chris Delay	2:57
9.	"Wake Up Beside Me" (featuring Dulce María)	Altberg; Dulce María	Altberg; Dulce María	2:41
10.	"Northern Light" (Original Mix)	Altberg; Marcus Wickstrom; Minna Benne Elo	Altberg; Scott Rosser (add.)	2:49
11.	"Saturday"	Engelina Larson; Erick Morillo; Mark Quashie; Mich Hansen; Thomas Troelsen	Cutfather; Thomas Trolsen; Wez Clarke (add.); Robert Uhlmann (vocal); Sarah West (add. vocal)	3:02
12.	"Fest i hela huset" (featuring Sweden Big Brother House)	Altberg; The Big Brother Theme	Altberg	2:51
13.	"Lawnmower to Music"	Altberg	Altberg	4:21
14.	"Pitchy"	Altberg	Altberg	2:16
15.	"I Came Here to Party"	Baptiste; Altberg; Najah	Altberg	2:48
16.	"Far Away" (Josh's Big Room Remix) (bonus track)	Vyskocil; Hutsch; Josh Williams (add.)	Altberg	4:56
17.	"Dream on the Dancefloor" (Rude Dog Remix) (bonus track)	Altberg; Simons; Kominek	Altberg; Simons; Rude Dog (add.)	5:10
18.	"Northern Light" (Candlelight Version) (bonus track)	Altberg; Wickstrom; Elo	Altberg; Rosser (add.)	3:09
Total length:				58:54

Calling Time – UK and Ireland version
No.	Title	Length
11.	"Open Your Eyes"	3:00

Calling Time – South African version
No.	Title	Writer(s)	Producer(s)	Length
1.	"Saturday"	Larson; Morillo; Quashie; Hansen; Troelsen	Cutfather; Trolsen; Clarke (add.); Uhlmann (vocal); West (add. vocal)	3:00
2.	"Dream on the Dancefloor" (Radio Edit)	Altberg; Simons; Kominek	Altberg; Simons	3:12
3.	"Crash & Burn"	Baptiste; Altberg	Altberg	3:09
4.	"Wake Up Beside Me" (featuring Dulce María)	Altberg; María	Altberg; María	2:41
5.	"Calling Time"	Altberg; Simons	Altberg; Simons	3:07
6.	"Far Away"	Vyskocil; Hutsch	Altberg	3:42
7.	"I've Got You Now"	Altberg	Altberg	3:11
8.	"You're Not Alone"	Altberg; Maja	Altberg; Delay	2:57
9.	"Rise My Love"	Altberg	Altberg	2:33
10.	"Pitchy Track"	Altberg	Altberg	2:16
11.	"I Came Here to Party"	Baptiste; Altberg; Najah	Altberg	2:48
12.	"Dirty" (featuring Sandra)	Altberg; Gundstedt	Altberg	2:53
13.	"Lawnmower to Music"	Altberg	Altberg	4:21
14.	"Fest I Hela Huset" (featuring Sweden Big Brother House)	Altberg; The Big Brother Theme	Altberg	2:51
15.	"Northern Light" (Original Mix)	Altberg; Wickstrom; Elo	Altberg; Rosser (add.)	2:49
16.	"Far Away" (Josh's Big Room Remix) (bonus track)	Vyskocil; Hutsch; Williams (add.)	Altberg	4:56
17.	"Dream on the Dancefloor" (Rude Dog Remix) (bonus track)	Altberg; Simons; Kominek	Altberg; Simons; Rude Dog (add.)	5:10
18.	"Northern Light" (Candlelight Version) (bonus track))	Altberg; Wickstrom; Elo	Altberg; Rosser (add.)	3:09

Notes

- "Saturday" is replaced by "Open Your Eyes" on the UK and Ireland versions of the album.

== Charts ==
Weekly chart performance for Calling Time
Chart (2013)	Peak position
US Dance/Electronic Albums	25

== Release history ==
Release dates for Calling Time
Region	Date	Format
South Africa	13 May 2013	CD, Digital download
Sweden	22 July 2013	Digital download
Ireland	23 July 2013	Digital download
Netherlands	23 July 2013	Digital download
Russia	23 July 2013	Digital download
United Kingdom	23 July 2013	Digital download
Germany	23 July 2013	Digital download
Australia	16 August 2013	CD, Digital download
United States	17 September 2013	Digital download
