= Dream on the Dancefloor =

Single by Basshunter

from the album Calling Time
- Released: 18 November 2012
- Genre: Dance
- Length: 3:12 (Radio Edit); 4:55 (Extended Ver.)
- Label: All Around the World; 3Beat Productions; Roster Music; Magic Records
- Songwriters: Scott Simons; Eric Turner; Basshunter
- Producers: Basshunter; Scott Simons

Basshunter singles chronology
"Northern Light" (2012)	"Dream on the Dancefloor" (2012)	"Crash & Burn" (2013)

Music video
- "Dream on the Dancefloor" on YouTube

"Dream on the Dancefloor" is a song by Swedish musician Basshunter, which appears on his fifth studio album, Calling Time.

== Background ==
On 13 July 2012, a fragment of the demo version of "Dream on the Dancefloor" was previewed in BBC Radio 1. The song heavily samples "L'amour toujours" by Gigi D'Agostino.

== Music video ==
Music video was directed by Gareth Evans and uploaded by All Around the World on 28 September 2012.

== Reception ==
In 2017 Rebecka Ljung from Aftonbladet described cover of "L'amour toujours" by Moon City Boys as a challenge to "Dream on the Dancefloor" by Basshunter.

== Live performances ==
Basshunter performed "Dream on the Dancefloor" in 2011 at Youth Beatz, which was witnessed by around 11,000 spectators. The artist also performed the song on 12 May 2012 at Maspalomas Pride 2012, where his performance was recorded and released in a box set among various artists.

== Track listing ==
- Digital download (18 November 2012)
1. "Dream on the Dancefloor" (Radio Edit) – 3:12
2. "Dream on the Dancefloor" (Extended Mix) – 4:54
3. "Dream on the Dancefloor" (Hi Def Radio Edit) – 3:01
4. "Dream on the Dancefloor" (Hi Def Remix) – 5:12
5. "Dream on the Dancefloor" (Rudedog Radio Edit) – 2:53
6. "Dream on the Dancefloor" (Rudedog Remix) – 5:10
- Digital download (12 February 2013)
1. "Dream on the Dancefloor" (Radio Edit) – 3:11
2. "Dream on the Dancefloor" (Hi Def Radio Edit) – 3:01
3. "Dream on the Dancefloor" (Rudedog Radio Edit) – 2:53
4. "Dream on the Dancefloor" (Extended Mix) – 4:54
5. "Dream on the Dancefloor" (Hi Def Remix) – 5:12
6. "Dream on the Dancefloor" (Hi Def Dub Mix) – 5:12
7. "Dream on the Dancefloor" (Rudedog Remix) – 5:09
8. "Dream on the Dancefloor" (Rudedog Instrumental Mix) – 5:04

== Charts ==
Weekly chart performance for "Dream on the Dancefloor"
Chart (2012/2013)	Peak position
United Kingdom (Commercial Pop Top 30)	6

== Release history ==
Country	Date	Format	Label
United Kingdom	18 November 2012	Digital download	3Beat Productions
Spain	13 February 2013	Digital download	Roster Music
Mexico	5 November 2013	Digital download	Mas Label
