= Crash & Burn (Basshunter song) =

Single by Basshunter

from the album Calling Time
- Released: 20 June 2013
- Genre: Dance; pop
- Length: 3:12 (Radio Edit)
- Label: Broma 16; Rush Hour; Magic Records; Extensive Music; Roster Music; Ultra Records
- Songwriters: Adam Baptiste; Basshunter
- Producer: Basshunter

Basshunter singles chronology
"Dream on the Dancefloor" (2012)	"Crash & Burn" (2013)	"Calling Time" (2013)

Music video
- "Crash & Burn" on YouTube

"Crash & Burn" is a song by Swedish musician Basshunter, which appears on his fifth studio album, Calling Time.

== Background ==
Song has a tempo of 140 beats per minute and is written in the key of A minor.

== Track listing ==
- Digital download (20 June 2013)
1. "Crash & Burn" – 3:09
2. "Crash & Burn" (Extended Mix) – 4:54
3. "Crash & Burn" (Josh Williams Remix) – 6:54
4. "Crash & Burn" (Basshunter Remix) – 3:29
5. "Crash & Burn" (Instrumental) – 3:09
- Digital download (22 July 2013)
1. "Crash & Burn" – 3:09
- Digital download (2 August 2013)
1. "Crash & Burn" – 3:09
2. "Crash & Burn" (Extended Mix) – 4:54
3. "Crash & Burn" (Josh Williams Remix) – 6:54
4. "Crash & Burn" (Basshunter Remix) – 3:29

== Release history ==
Country	Date	Format	Label
Russia, Armenia, Lithuania, Moldova, Ukraine	20 June 2013	Digital download	Broma 16
Netherlands, Argentina, Armenia, Austria, Belgium, Bolivia, Botswana, Brazil, Bulgaria, Chile, Columbia, Costa Rica, Cyprus, Czech Republic, Dominican Republic, Ecuador, El Salvador, Estonia, France, Germany, Greece, Guatemala, Guinea-Bissau, Honduras, Hong Kong, Hungary, India, Indonesia, Ireland, Italy, Japan, Kenya, Latvia, Lithuania, Luxembourg, Malta, Mozambique, Netherlands, Nicaragua, Niger, Nigeria, Panama, Paraguay, Peru, Philippines, Portugal, Puerto Rico, Republic of China, Singapore, Slovakia, Slovenia, Switzerland, Thailand, Turkey, Uganda, United Kingdom, Uruguay, Venezuela, Vietnam	20 June 2013<	Digital download	Rush Hour
Poland	1 July 2013	Digital download	Magic Records
New Zealand	22 July 2013	Digital download	Extensive Music
United States, Canada	30 July 2013	Ultra Records	
Spain	30 July 2013	Digital download	Roster Music
Sweden, Denmark, Finland, Norway	6 August 2013	Digital download	Warner Music Sweden
Mexico	22 October 2013	Digital download	+Mas Label, Empo
Sweden	2013	Promo CD	Warner Dance Labels

== Music video ==
Music video was directed by Farzad Bayat and uploaded by Basshunter on 24 June 2013.

== Charts ==
=== Weekly charts ===
Weekly chart performance for "Crash & Burn"
Chart (2013)	Peak position
Denmark (Dancechart)	43
Denmark (Hypechart)	3
Russia (Top Hit Weekly Audience Choice)	49
Russia (Top Hit Weekly General)	45
Russia (Top Hit Weekly Moscow)	51
Russia (Top Hit Weekly Russia)	48
Russia (Top Hit Weekly St. Petersburg)	31
United Kingdom (Commercial Pop Top 30)	30

=== Year-end charts ===
Yearly chart performance for "Crash & Burn"
Chart (2013)	Position
CIS (TopHit)	136
Russia Airplay (TopHit)	177

== Live performances ==
Basshunter performed "Crash & Burn" on 13 July 2013 at Europa Plus Live in Moscow, where there was an estimated 300,000 spectators. It was noted that millions watched his act on TV.
