= Mange Makers =

Swedish musical group

- Origin: Stockholm, Sweden
- Genres: Techno; house
- Years active: 2011–present
- Labels: Universal Music
- Members: Didrik Rastbäck; Max Henriksson; Peter Bacall (BACALL); 2011-2014, 2021-
- Past members: Max Christensson

Mange Makers is a Swedish music group composed of Peter Balazs (stage name Bacall) as video & music producer 2011–2014, Max Christensson as dancer, Max Henriksson as beatbox and Didrik Rastbäck as vocals.

They released their first song "Fest hos Mange" ("Party at Mange's") on YouTube in 2011. The song was created as a joke to surprise Henriksson's and Rastbäck's friend named Mange, who was throwing a party, the group has however not revealed more about who Mange is. The song became a sensation in Sweden, reaching number 9 on the Swedish Singles Chart, topping the iTunes chart, and reaching 9 million views on YouTube. Their Christmas adaptation called "Jul hos Mange" also charted on the Swedish Singles Chart, reaching number 26.

Their next single was "Mange bjuder", which peaked at number two on the Swedish Singles Chart. It was followed up by "Drick den".

== Discography ==
=== Studio albums ===
Title	Album details
R3union	Released: 23 July 2021; Label: Party Makers; Format: Digital download, streaming

=== Singles ===
List of singles as lead artist
Title	Year	Peak position
Title	Year	SWE
"Fest hos Mange"	2011	9
"Jul hos Mange"	2011	26
"Mange bjuder"	2011	2
"Drick den"	2012	9
"Mange för en dag"	2013	60
"Inte en krona"	2013	47
"Vakna"	2014	—
"Mange kommer hem till dig"	2015	— (Note: "Mange kommer hem till dig" did not enter the Swedish Singles Chart, but peaked at number three on the Swedish Heatseeker chart.)
"Bättre förr"	2016	—
"Ballar Ur (Hall of Fame)"	2021	52
"Norrlandsguld"	2021	—
"Rakt in"	2022	—
"Pastavatten (Remix)" (Sommarkatten)	2022	—
"Legenden om Mange" (feat. Heno.)	2022	—
"—" denotes a recording that did not chart or was not released in that country.

=== Music videos ===
List of music videos as lead artist
Title	Year	Ref.
"Fest hos Mange"	2011	
"Mange bjuder"	2011	
"Drick den"	2012	
"Mange för en dag"	2012	
"Inte en krona"	2013	
"Vakna"	2014	
"Mange kommer hem till dig"	2015	
"Bättre förr"	2016	
"Ballar Ur"	2021	
"Norrlandsguld"	2021	(Note: The music video for "Norrlandsguld" was taken down from YouTube due to a potential trademark infringement lawsuit from the Swedish Football Association.)
"Utslängd"	2021	
