= Alina Pușcău =

Romanian model, actress and singer (born 1981)

- Born: 17 November 1981 (age 44); Bucharest, Romania
- Occupations: Model; actress; singer
- Years active: 1998–present
- Modeling information
- Height: 1.77 m (5 ft 9 1/2 in)
- Hair color: Brown
- Eye color: Green
- Agency

Alina Pușcău (Romanian pronunciation: [aˈlina puʃˈkəw]; born 17 November 1981) is a Romanian model, actress and singer. She started modeling after she was crowned the winner of the 1998 Elite Model Look. She has modeled for Victoria's Secret, GAP, JCPenney and Pepe Jeans. She has appeared on the cover of Playboy and released a debut single and music video titled "When You Leave (Numa Numa)", which is a cover of the English version of "Dragostea din tei".

== Discography ==
=== Studio albums ===
Title	Album details
Everybody Wants Me	Released: 2008; Label: Rat Records; Format: CD
Starlit Skies	Released: 2024; Label: Water Melon Studios; Format: CD, Digital release

=== Singles ===
Title	Year	Peak chart positions	Album
Title	Year	US	Album
"When You Leave (Numa Numa)"	2008	— (Note: "When You Leave (Numa Numa)" did not enter the Billboard Hot 100, but peaked at number 6 on the Hot Dance Airplay chart.)	Everybody Wants Me
"Red Light"	2010	—	Non-album single
"—" denotes a recording that did not chart or was not released in that country.

=== Music videos ===
Title	Year	Director(s)	Ref.
"When You Leave (Numa Numa)"	2008	Brett Ratner; Fatima Robinson	
"Red Light"	2011	Unknown	

== Filmography ==
Title	Year	Role	Notes
Shallow Hal	2001	Night club goers #1	
Conan the Barbarian	2011	Lara	
Illusive Fields	2012	—N/a	Short
Dracula: The Dark Prince	2013	Camelia	
X/Y	2014	Hannah	
Vigilante Diaries	2016	Marina	
Lycan	2017	Anna	
Number 14	TBA	Rebecca	Short

== See also ==
- List of music released by Romanian artists that has charted in major music markets
