= Saturday (Basshunter song) =

Single by Basshunter

from the album Calling Time
- Released: 18 July 2010
- Recorded: 2010
- Genre: Dance-pop
- Length: 3:02
- Label: Dance Nation
- Songwriters: Erick Morillo; Mark Quashie; Cutfather; Thomas Troelsen; Engelina
- Producers: Cutfather; Thomas Troelsen

Basshunter singles chronology
"I Promised Myself" (2009)	"Saturday" (2010)	"Fest i hela huset" (2011)

Music video
- "Saturday" on YouTube

"Saturday" is a song by Swedish musician Basshunter. It was released in the United Kingdom on 18 July 2010 as the lead single from his forthcoming fifth studio album. The song samples Reel 2 Real's "I Like to Move It". "Saturday" peaked at number twenty-one on the UK Singles Chart and number five on the UK Dance Chart. In Ireland, it peaked at number thirty-seven.

== Background and production ==
"Saturday" was written by Danish songwriters Cutfather, Thomas Troelsen and Engelina, and produced by Cutfather, Thomas Troelsen, and Wez Clarke. It samples the beat and melody from Reel 2 Real's "I Like to Move It", written by Erick Morillo and Mark Quashie.

On 14 May 2010, it was officially announced that "Saturday" would be the first single from Basshunter's forthcoming fourth studio album. It premiered on BBC Radio 1 with Scott Mills that same night.

Basshunter said of the song: "It's about Saturdays in general: going out with friends, drinking, clubbing, dancing, meeting girls and then hopefully doing something else when the sun goes down."

== Composition ==
The song is composed in the key of A minor and is set in time signature of common time with a fast tempo of 128 beats per minute. At the bridge, it transposes to A Dorian (Relative key of E minor). After the bridge, it transposes back to A minor.

== Reception ==
Professional ratings
Review scores
Source	Rating
BBC	3/5 stars
Digital Spy	3/5 stars

Pete Cashmore from The Guardian described the single as "entirely aggregational Euroguff". Robert Copsey of Digital Spy gave the song three out of five stars and wrote: "The production has a hint of RedOne-ness to it, and the chorus features a suspiciously Natalie Horler-esque vocal, but this change of tack still feels fundamentally Basshunter." The BBC's Fraser McAlpine also gave it three stars, commenting that "this represents a development in the Basshunter sound. Where once he seemed to be making dance tracks to sing to, now he seems to be writing with a full song in mind".

== Music video ==
The music video was choreographed by Mihran Kirakosian, directed by Alex Herron and filmed by Ketil Dietrichson. The video discontinues the fictional love story between Basshunter and Aylar Lie; a feature of all previous Basshunter music videos. This was due to his jealousy over Aylar Lie's new relationship. He described her boyfriend as ‘a problem’

Instead it features Basshunter singing in a night club surrounded by attractive dancers. He is also shown controlling the girls with a holographic computer, which is a possible reference to Basshunter's personal interest in computer games, and an echo of the music video "DotA", Basshunter's second single, which is based on playing computer games.

== Live performances ==
Basshunter performed "Saturday" on Big Brother's Little Brother on 3 July 2010, and a day later as part of Channel 4's music event T4 on the Beach.

== Chart performance ==
"Saturday" debuted on the Irish Singles Chart at number thirty-seven on 23 July 2010. Two days later it debuted at number twenty-one on the UK Singles Chart, marking Basshunter's seventh Top 40 single in the UK and fifth most successful single to date, as well as reaching number five on the UK Dance Chart.

Music for "Saturday" charted at number one in Polish Video Chart. Based on Nielsen data reported between 1 September 2010 and 1 August 2011, Basshunter tracks were notable in digital downloads in Poland.

== Track listing ==
1. "Saturday" (Radio Edit) – 3:03
2. "Saturday" (Digital Dog Edit) – 3:14
3. "Saturday" (Almighty Edit) – 3:39
4. "Saturday" (Extended Mix) – 5:22
5. "Saturday" (Digital Dog Remix) – 6:05
6. "Saturday" (Almighty Remix) – 6:59
7. "Saturday" (Mark Breeze Remix) – 5:50
8. "Saturday" (Payami Remix) – 4:43

== Personnel ==
- Songwriting – Erick Morillo, Mark Quashie, Mich Hansen, Thomas Troelsen, Engelina Larsen
- Production – Cutfather, Thomas Troelsen
- Additional production and mixing – Wez Clarke
- Vocal production – Robert Uhlmann

== Charts ==
=== Weekly charts ===
Weekly chart performance for "Saturday"
Chart (2010)	Peak position
CIS Airplay (TopHit)	6
Europe (European Hot 100 Singles)	59
Ireland (IRMA)	37
New Zealand (Recorded Music NZ)	14
Poland (Video Chart)	1
Russia Airplay (TopHit)	4
Slovakia Airplay (ČNS IFPI)	91
UK Singles (OCC)	21
UK Dance (OCC)	5
UK Indie (OCC)	2
US Dance Singles Sales (Billboard)	9

=== Year-end charts ===
Yearly chart performance for "Saturday"
Chart (2010)	Position
CIS (TopHit)	46
Russia Airplay (TopHit)	46

== Certifications ==
Certifications and sales for "Saturday"
Region	Certification	Certified units/sales
New Zealand (RMNZ)	Gold	7,500^{*}
^{*} Sales figures based on certification alone.

== Release history ==
Region	Date	Label	Format
United Kingdom	18 July 2010	Dance Nation	Digital download
United Kingdom	19 July 2010	Dance Nation	CD single
United States	27 July 2010	Dance Nation	CD single, digital download
