= Fest i hela huset =

Single by Basshunter vs Big Brother

from the album Calling Time
- Language: Swedish
- Released: 20 April 2011
- Recorded: 2011
- Length: 2:50
- Label: Warner Music Sweden
- Songwriters: Basshunter; Big Brother (Note: According to ACE Repertory data, "Fest i hela huset" was written by Basshunter, Simon Danielsson, Gurkan Gasi, Sara Jönsson, and Sonia Kamau.)
- Producer: Basshunter

Basshunter singles chronology
| "Saturday" (2010) | "Fest i hela huset" (2011) | "Northern Light" (2012) |

Audio video
- "Fest i hela huset" on YouTube

"Fest i hela huset" (transl. "Party in the house") is a song by Swedish musician Basshunter, recorded during the fifth season of the Swedish edition of the reality television franchise Big Brother. It was released as a single on 20 April 2011 by Warner Music Sweden and included on Basshunter's 2013 studio album Calling Time. The song was written by Basshunter and Big Brother contestants Simon Danielsson, Gurkan Gasi, Sara Jönsson and Sonia Kamau. Basshunter also produced. It peaked at number five on the Swedish singles chart and was number 70 on the year-end chart. The Big Brother episode featuring Basshunter was watched by 202,000 viewers.

== Background and release ==
Big Brother is a reality competition television franchise in which contestants live in a house, continuously monitored and isolated from the outside world. On 8 April 2011, it was announced that Basshunter would appear on Swedish Big Brother to record a song with the show's contestants. Basshunter had previously appeared as a contestant on the seventh season of the British series Celebrity Big Brother.

Before Basshunter entered the Big Brother house on 11 April, his manager stated that he liked contestant Gurkan Gasi. When Basshunter entered the house, he identified Gasi as an "obvious" candidate to sing. The assignment room was transformed into a studio where Basshunter conducted auditions and asked contestants about their creativity, strengths, and weaknesses. None of the contestants had worked with music professionally. Basshunter said the contestants impressed him, though he was initially unsure about their ability to succeed. After Basshunter selected the contestants, the song was scheduled to be released on 14 April. The song was written by Basshunter and Big Brother contestants Simon Danielsson, Gurkan Gasi, Sara Jönsson, and Sonia Kamau; Basshunter was responsible for the production. Simon Danielsson became the winner of Big Brother after 106 days.

The title of the song, "Fest i hela huset", was revealed on 12 April. The song premiered during the 17 April episode of Big Brother. The show's organisers planned for Basshunter to appear in the Big Brother house for the song's premiere, but Basshunter cancelled due to a scheduling conflict.

The song, which has a runtime of 2:50, was released commercially in Sweden on 20 April for digital download and streaming. This was followed by a two-track CD single released on 11 May. A three-track digital-only version that included the track alongside an instrumental version and ClubKid remix was then released to various countries on 23 May. "Fest i hela huset" was Basshunter's first single since "Saturday", which was released on 5 July 2010. The song was followed in Basshunter's singles chronology by "Northern Light" on 21 May 2012, and both tracks were included in Basshunter's 2013 studio album Calling Time.

== Reception and chart performance ==
The Big Brother episode featuring Basshunter was watched by 202,000 viewers, an increase of 20,000 compared to the previous week. One of the vocalists, Annie Almén, praised the song's danceable beat, while Big Brother press officer Erik Sidung described the song as fantastic. On 6 May 2011, "Fest i hela huset" entered the Swedish singles chart at number 16, spending 18 weeks on the chart and peaking at number five. The song also entered the Swedish year-end chart for 2011 at number 70.

On 30 March 2012, Top Cats released the single "Sad But True" for the following season of Big Brother. It featured the show's contestants, who performed as backing vocalists. Viewers criticised the song for the limited participation of Big Brother contestants and said that Basshunter's "Fest i hela huset" was more appropriate for the program.

== Track listing ==
Digital download (20 April 2011), streaming
| No. | Title | Writer(s) | Producer(s) | Length |
|---|---|---|---|---|
| 1. | "Fest i hela huset (Basshunter vs. BigBrother)" | Jonas Altberg; BigBrother 2011 | Altberg | 2:50 |

CD single (11 May 2011)
| No. | Title | Writer(s) | Producer(s) | Length |
|---|---|---|---|---|
| 1. | "Fest i hela huset (Single Version)" | Annie Almen; Gurkan Gasi; Sara Jönsson; Simon Danielsson; Sonia Kamau | Basshunter | 2:51 |
| 2. | "Fest i hela huset (Instrumental)" | Annie Almen; Gurkan Gasi; Sara Jönsson; Simon Danielsson; Sonia Kamau | Basshunter | 2:45 |
| Total length: | | | | 5:36 |

Digital download (23 May 2011), streaming
| No. | Title | Writer(s) | Producer(s) | Length |
|---|---|---|---|---|
| 1. | "Fest i hela huset (Basshunter vs. BigBrother)" | Altberg; BigBrother 2011 | Unknown | 2:50 |
| 2. | "Fest i hela huset (ClubKid Remix) [Basshunter vs. BigBrother]" | Altberg; BigBrother 2011 | Unknown | 3:50 |
| 3. | "Fest i hela huset (Instrumental) [Basshunter vs. BigBrother]" | Altberg; BigBrother 2011 | Unknown | 2:45 |
| Total length: | | | | 9:25 |

== Charts ==
=== Weekly charts ===
Weekly chart performance for "Fest i hela huset"
| Chart (2011) | Peak position |
|---|---|
| Sweden (Sverigetopplistan) | 5 |

=== Year-end charts ===
Yearly chart performance for "Fest i hela huset"
| Chart (2011) | Position |
|---|---|
| Sweden (Sverigetopplistan) | 70 |

== Release history ==
Release dates and formats for "Fest i hela huset"
| Country | Date | Version | Format | Label | Ref. |
|---|---|---|---|---|---|
| Sweden | 20 April 2011 | Single | Digital download, streaming | Warner Music Sweden | |
| Sweden | 11 May 2011 | Single | CD single | Warner Music Sweden | |
| Various | 23 May 2011 | Single | Digital download, streaming | Warner Music Sweden | |
