= Boten Anna =

2006 single by Basshunter

Single by Basshunter

from the album LOL
- Language: Swedish
- Released: 9 May 2006
- Recorded: March 2006
- Genre: Eurodance, trance
- Length: 3:28
- Label: Warner Music Sweden
- Songwriter: Basshunter
- Producer: Basshunter

Basshunter singles chronology
"Welcome to Rainbow" (2006)	"Boten Anna" (2006)	"Vi sitter i Ventrilo och spelar DotA" (2006)

Music video
- "Boten Anna" (original version) on YouTube

Music video
- "Boten Anna" (2nd version) on YouTube

"Boten Anna" ("Anna the Bot") is a song by Swedish musician Basshunter, from his first studio album, LOL. Following the single's release in 2006, Basshunter gained popularity in his native Sweden, as well as Finland, Denmark, Iceland, Norway, Poland and the Netherlands. The song topped hit charts and, on 3 May 2006, was named Norway's official Russ-song of the year. It was also the most popular song at The Gathering LAN party 2006. An English version titled "Now You're Gone", sung by Sebastian Westwood, using unrelated lyrics, was released in December 2007.

In 2023, Basshunter collaborated with Victor Leksell on "Ingen kan slå (Boten Anna)". It peaked on the Swedish singles chart at number four.

== Lyrics and composition ==
The Swedish lyrics of "Boten Anna" tell the story of a female Internet Relay Chat user who the vocalist believes is a bot but later finds out to be a beautiful woman, although she will always remain a bot in his eyes. The song is based on an actual experience of Basshunter. At the beginning of 2006 he created #basshunter.se channel in QuakeNet with the help of a fan. The fan created a bot with administrative capabilities; when this happened, Basshunter saw a new user with administrative capabilities named "Anna" enter the channel, and thought this was the bot. One day in March, Basshunter returned home after playing at the club La Cocaracha in Halmstad. He and his friends played the computer game Counter-Strike while they were connected to the chat program mIRC. Basshunter typed a command into the command line to the bot to kick himself out of the channel. His drunk friend had taken control of the bot and kicked everyone out of the channel except for the two of them. Channel users started laughing, and it turned out that Anna was his friend's girlfriend.

The artist stated that the song is easy to understand and sing, even when the person singing does not speak the Swedish language. The Swedish word "bot" ("bot") was frequently mistaken for "boat" ("båt"). The double meaning of the word "kanal" – which can refer to an IRC channel, as well as a water canal, added to the confusion.

"Boten Anna" has a tempo of 140 beats per minute and is written in the key of A minor.

== Release ==
Basshunter recorded "Boten Anna" in March 2006 in one night over the course of six hours. He made it available on his website for free download. The song was downloaded an estimated 37,000 times within twenty-four hours of its release. With this success, Basshunter received several proposals from managers and music labels. Swedish DJ and party organizer Joakim Jarny contacted Basshunter via Internet Relay Chat and Jarny was soon overwhelmed by hundreds of requests from club owners in Sweden, Norway and Denmark who wanted Basshunter to perform at their clubs. Jarny contacted his friend Henrik Uhlmann at Extensive Music and in April 2006, Basshunter signed with Extensive Music and Warner Music Sweden. On 9 May 2006, "Boten Anna" was officially released as a single. According to information published on 8 June 2006, the song had been downloaded an estimated over one million times. In that year, Basshunter moved to Malmö, where the headquarters of Extensive Music are located. "Boten Anna" was included on Basshunter's second studio album LOL. Basshunter said that it is impossible to record a whole album in style of "Boten Anna", or it would take him a very long time, and he wanted to show that he is able to mix different styles. Basshunter said that he wanted to continue recording Swedish songs until he had six or seven songs in Swedish which satisfied him and then he wanted to translate them into the English language.

== Music video ==
Three days were allotted for the production of the music video for "Boten Anna". The music video to the song deliberately plays on double meanings. It shows Basshunter riding a pedal boat in Malmö. The music video features the text-based chat system for instant messaging mIRC.

== Reception ==
Professional ratings
Review scores
Source	Rating
Findance.com	8/10 stars

An editor from Sundsvalls Tidning compared "Boten Anna" to the songs "Hej hej Monika" by Nic & the Family and "Axel F" by Crazy Frog. Christopher Lembke from Ystads Allehanda said that "Crazy" by Gnarls Barkley is the only good song which can compete with "Boten Anna" for radio listeners' favor this summer. Brynjar Mår from FM957 recommended the song and said that "Boten Anna" is a hilarious dance song and has an addictive melody. Uffe Jørgensen from B.T. that "Boten Anna" consists of equal parts Swedish sense of pop and hard-hitting beats reminiscent of 90s hits such as "Mr. Vain" by Culture Beat. In 2010, Danish musician Henrik Marstal described "Boten Anna" as a model summer hit and explained that in the past, the summer hit was something that people bet on a lot and it was a matter of having a song that could hit the mark and live for a single summer. Tom Jerry Boman in his ranking of summer hits for Mitt i described "Boten Anna" as the most unlikely summer torment of all time but he noted it is both festive and gives nerds a certain amount of fresh feeling. In 2018, Finnish singer Nelli Matula admitted in the publication Ilta-Sanomat that she did not know that the song is not about a boat, but instead about a bot. This caused discussion of the lyrics and Anna Abreu, Laura Friman and Kimmo Sainio also admitted that they did not understand the lyrics.

In 2007, Birgitte Söndergaard and Johan Andersson danced to the song on the Swedish television series Let's Dance. This year also saw the release of the computer game Singstar Pop Hits, the Scandinavian version of which includes the song "Boten Anna". "Boten Anna" was played in 2015 during The Gathering LAN party. In 2019, "Boten Anna" was ranked seventh in a Gaffa poll for the song that is the biggest summer torment. The 2022 song "Vandraren" by Daniela Rathana was inspired by "Boten Anna". On 20 November 2023, "Boten Anna" was the fourth most streamed Swedish language song on Spotify with 99 million streams. According to data published on 4 June 2024, "Boten Anna" was still the fourth most streamed Swedish language song in Spotify with over 107 million streams.

== Chart performance ==
"Boten Anna" entered the Swedish singles chart at number three on 8 June 2006 and peaked in its ninth week at number one. It was certified Platinum and became the fourth single of the year to be certiied. The song sold 60,000 copies in Sweden. In Denmark, "Boten Anna" debuted at number two on 23 June then peaked at number one the next week and spent a total of 14 consecutive weeks at number one. It was sold in 27,000 downloads, 23,000 ringtones and 11,000 units of streaming, music video and bundle downloads (including the album) in 2006. "Boten Anna" was certified triple Platinum in the beginning of 2007. "Boten Anna" entered the Dutch singles chart on 29 July and it peaked at second place on 19 August, where it spent six consecutive weeks at number two. On 16 and 23 September, Basshunter's "Boten Anna" was at second place while the Gebroeders Ko version was at third. "Boten Anna" peaked at number one on the Swedish and Norwegian ringtones chart. In December, "Boten Anna" entered the Austrian singles chart and peaked at number two in 2007. The song spent 39 weeks on the chart and was certified Gold. "Boten Anna" charted at number 30 on the European Hot 100 Singles.

== Track listing ==
- CD single (9 May 2006)
1. "Boten Anna" (Radio Mix) – 3:29
2. "Boten Anna" (Club Mix) – 5:26
- CD single (4 September 2006)
1. "Boten Anna" (Radio Edit) – 3:29
2. "Boten Anna" (Club Remix) – 5:26
3. "Boten Anna" (DJ Micro Spankin Club Remix) – 5:30
4. "Boten Anna" (Backslash Fluffy Style Remix) – 4:40
5. "Boten Anna" (SkillsToPayTheBills Remix) – 4:34
6. "Boten Anna" (Instrumental) – 3:20

== Charts ==
=== Weekly charts ===
2006 weekly chart performance for "Boten Anna"
Chart (2006)	Peak position
Belgium (Ultratip Bubbling Under Flanders)	6
Denmark (Tracklisten)	1
Europe (European Hot 100 Singles)	30
Finland (Suomen virallinen lista)	4
Netherlands (Dutch Top 40)	1
Netherlands (Single Top 100)	2
Norway (VG-lista)	3
Sweden (Sverigetopplistan)	1

2007 weekly chart performance for "Boten Anna"
Chart (2007)	Peak position
Austria (Ö3 Austria Top 40)	2
Czech Republic Airplay (ČNS IFPI)	17
Germany (GfK)	9
Spain (Promusicae)	20
Switzerland (Schweizer Hitparade)	45

=== Year-end charts ===
2006 yearly chart performance for "Boten Anna"
Chart (2006)	Position
Denmark (IFPI Danmark)	2
Netherlands (Dutch Top 40)	12
Netherlands (Single Top 100)	9
Sweden (Sverigetopplistan)	4

2007 yearly chart performance for "Boten Anna"
Chart (2007)	Position
Austria (Ö3 Austria Top 40)	10
Europe (European Hot 100 Singles)	97
Germany (Official German Charts)	29

== Certifications and sales ==
Certifications and sales for "Boten Anna"
Region	Certification	Certified units/sales
Austria (IFPI Austria)	Gold	15,000^{*}
Denmark (IFPI Danmark)	3× Platinum	27,000
Finland	—	8,044
Sweden (GLF)	Platinum	60,000
Summaries
Europe	—	500,000
^{*} Sales figures based on certification alone.

== Awards ==
Awards for "Boten Anna"
Award	Year	Category	Result	Ref.
Eurodanceweb Award	2006	Best Dance Track of the Year	Won	
Gaygalan Award	2007	Swedish Song of the Year	Nominated	
P3 Guld	2007	Song of the Year	Nominated	
Rockbjörnen	2006	Swedish Song of the Year	Nominated	
Russ.no	2006	Russ Song of the Year	Won	
Telia	2007	Best Ringtone of the Year	Won	

== Gebroeders Ko version ==
"Boten Anna"

Single by Gebroeders Ko
- Released: 7 July 2006
- Length: 3:16
- Label: Berk Music
- Songwriters: Adrie van den Berk; Ronald van Grootel
- Producers: Adrie van den Berk; Ronald van Grootel

Gebroeders Ko singles chronology
"Daar word ik niet vrolijk van!!" (2006)	"Boten Anna" (2006)	"Sinterklaas boot (Boten Anna)" (2006)

Music video
- "Boten Anna" on YouTube

=== Background ===
Dutch duo Gebroeders Ko recorded a bootleg version of "Boten Anna", which was released on 7 July 2006. This version tells about a boat named Anna. Basshunter treated the song as a tribute. On 17 November, "Sinterklaas boot (Boten Anna)" version was released.

=== Track listing ===
CD single (7 July 2006)
No.	Title	Writer(s)	Producer(s)	Length
1.	"Boten Anna"	Gebroeders Ko, Adrie van den Berk, Ronald van Grootel	Gebroeders Ko, Adrie van den Berk, Ronald van Grootel	3:17
2.	"Boten Anna (Lange Boot Versie)"	Gebroeders Ko, Adrie van den Berk, Ronald van Grootel	Gebroeders Ko, Adrie van den Berk, Ronald van Grootel	4:45
3.	"Severnavl"	Gerard Koopmans, Ton Koopmans	Gebroeders Ko	2:49

=== Chart performance ===
In the Netherlands, the spoof of the song entered the chart on 22 July 2006 at number 48 and peaked at number 3 on 16 and 23 September. The song became the 14th best-selling single of the year. In Belgian Flanders, the song entered on 21 November and peaked at number eight on 16 December. In November, another spoof of the song by Gebroeders Ko, charted in the Dutch chart. "Sinterklaas Boot (Boten Anna)" entered the Dutch chart on 4 November and peaked at number two on 2 December. This version of "Boten Anna" is about the boat of Sinterklaas.

=== Charts ===
Weekly chart performance for "Boten Anna"
Chart (2006)	Peak position
Belgium (Ultratop 50 Flanders)	8
Netherlands (Dutch Top 40)	6
Netherlands (Dutch Top 40) Sinterklaas boot (Boten Anna)	7
Netherlands (Single Top 100)	3
Netherlands (Single Top 100) Sinterklaas boot (Boten Anna)	2

=== Year-end charts ===
Yearly chart performance for "Boten Anna"
Chart (2006)	Position
Belgium (Ultratop Flanders)	83
Netherlands (Dutch Top 40)	45
Netherlands (Single Top 100)	14
Netherlands (Single Top 100) Sinterklaas boot (Boten Anna)	65

== "Now You're Gone" ==
An English version of "Boten Anna" titled "Now You're Gone", sung by Sebastian Westwood using unrelated lyrics by DJ Mental Theo's Bazzheadz which was originally released in 2006, became the music to a video by Basshunter with the same title in November 2007. The video and the track were met with worldwide chart success and became the most requested record in summer holiday resorts around Europe in early 2008. As people returning from their holidays wanted to hear it again, TV channels in the UK were inundated with requests for the video. On 13 January 2008, "Now You're Gone" entered number one in the UK Singles Chart and spent five weeks at the top of the chart, ending Leon Jackson's three-week run with "When You Believe". In the sixth week after the song's release, it was knocked off the top by Welsh singer Duffy, with her song "Mercy".

== "Ingen kan slå (Boten Anna)" ==
"Ingen kan slå (Boten Anna)"

Single by Basshunter and Victor Leksell
- Released: 23 June 2023
- Length: 2:09
- Label: Iconic Music Sweden
- Songwriters: Basshunter; Victor Leksell; Pontus Persson
- Producers: Basshunter; Pontus Persson; Robert Uhlmann

Basshunter singles chronology
"End the Lies" (2022)	"Ingen kan slå (Boten Anna)" (2023)

Victor Leksell singles chronology
"Fånga mig när jag faller" (2023)	"Ingen kan slå (Boten Anna)" (2023)	"Stor man" (2023)

Audio
- "Ingen kan slå (Boten Anna)" on YouTube

=== Background ===
The previous Basshunter single, "End the Lies", released on 2 September 2022, was a collaboration with Italian duo Alien Cut. In 2023, Basshunter collaborated with Victor Leksell on "Ingen kan slå (Boten Anna)". The previous Leksell single "Fånga mig när jag faller" was released on 28 April, and reached number three on Swedish singles chart. "Ingen kan slå (Boten Anna)" was written by Basshunter and Victor Leksell, and produced by Basshunter, Pontus Persson and Robert Uhlmann. Leksell was in talks with Basshunter about working together and originally Basshunter was supposed to remix his 2020 song "Svag", but instead of it they recorded "Ingen kan slå (Boten Anna)". "Ingen kan slå (Boten Anna)" was recorded during one weekend in Dubai's studio. Basshunter praised Viktor Leksell and described him as a very talented person. Viktor Leksell said that the song goes well with other songs on his set list, and that he will play it live. However, Liselott Lindberg from LiveNews.se noticed that Leksell did not play the song during Lollapalooza in Stockholm. Basshunter said that while he does not have any concert scheduled in Sweden during the summer, he stated that it is possible for him to perform it during Leksell's summer festival tour. The next Leksell single "Stor man" is a collaboration with Danish singer Tobias Rahim and was released on 7 July. On 28 July, Victor Leksell sang the song at the Amaze Festival in Smögen.

=== Reception and chart performance ===
Tali da Silva from Sveriges Television stated that Victor Leksell made a joke about the original lyrics by singing about the boat at the beginning. Karin Pihl from Göteborgs-Posten described "Ingen kan slå (Boten Anna)" as a slickly produced version with "silly, buttery vocals and without the brain-dead gaming charm". On 30 June 2023, "Ingen kan slå (Boten Anna)" entered the Swedish singles chart at number 10. Lars Nylin from Musikindustrin described it as the strongest news of the week and Karl Batterbee from Scan Magazine described it as welcome surprise.. It peaked the next week at fourth. In the third week on the chart for "Ingen kan slå (Boten Anna)", Victor Leksell's next single "Stor man" debuted on 15th position on Swedish chart. "Ingen kan slå (Boten Anna)" is the first Basshunter single to enter the Swedish chart since "Fest i hela huset" from 2011. The song spent 13 weeks on the chart.

=== Track listing ===
Digital download, streaming (23 June 2023)
No.	Title	Length
1.	"Ingen kan slå (Boten Anna)"	2:09

=== Personnel ===
Credits

- Writer – Basshunter, Victor Leksell, Pontus Persson
- Producer – Basshunter, Pontus Persson, Robert Uhlmann

=== Charts ===
Weekly chart performance for "Ingen kan slå (Boten Anna)"
Chart (2023)	Peak position
Sweden (Sverigetopplistan)	4

== Other versions ==
In 2006, the company JME Data used "Boten Anna" with different lyrics for an advertisement. An Israeli band called Hovevey Zion (חובבי ציון) spoofed "Boten Anna" with their popular single, "Rotze banot" (רוצה בנות, meaning "I Want Girls"). "Dicke Anna" by Kid Bob was released on 20 April 2007. It charted on the singles chart in Austria and Germany. In 2010, Swedish band Torgny Melins released their studio album Dansbandsnatt, which cointaned a cover of "Boten Anna". Dansbandsnatt peaked at number two on the Swedish albums chart. In 2021, "Boten Anna" was covered by electronic music act Finnish Millennium Project.

== See also ==
- List of number-one singles of the 2000s (Sweden)
- List of number-one songs of the 2000s (Denmark)
- List of number-one singles of 2007 (Finland)
- List of Dutch Top 40 number-one singles of 2006
