= List of songs recorded by Basshunter =

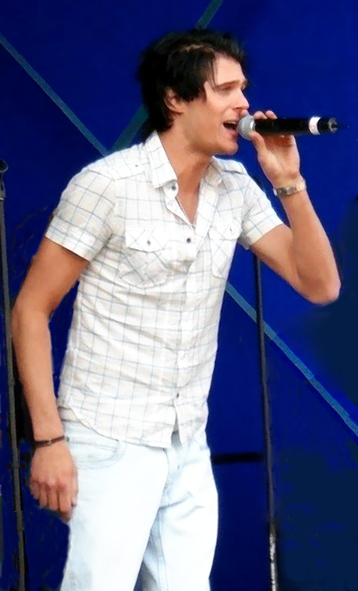
Basshunter performing live in Halmstad, 20 April 2008

Basshunter is a Swedish singer, record producer and DJ. He has recorded over 100 songs for five studio albums and two compilation albums. (Note: According to Swedish magazine Filter, in 2004, Basshunter had already composed up to 300 songs.) His first album, The Bassmachine, was released on 25 August 2004. He made his music available for free as internet downloads on platforms such as chat channels and gaming websites. In 2006, he signed with Extensive Music and Warner Music Sweden. The Old Shit—a compilation album of Basshunter's unreleased tracks—and The Bassmachine were made available to buy on his website in 2006. Basshunter's second studio album, LOL, was released on 28 August 2006. This was followed by the singles "Vi sitter i Ventrilo och spelar DotA" and "Vifta med händerna", on which Basshunter collaborated with Patrik & Lillen. He then worked with PJ Harmony, producing "Utan stjärnorna", (Note: According to ACE Repertory data, "Utan stjärnorna" was written by Basshunter and Ali Payami. On the later 2006 release of LOL at "Without Stars" it indicates that Basshunter solely wrote and produced the song.) "Var är jag" (Note: According to ACE Repertory data, "Var är jag" was written by Basshunter and Ali Payami.) and "Festfolk [2006 Remix]". (Note: According to ACE Repertory data, "Festfolk" [2006 Remix] was written by Basshunter and Ali Payami.)

In 2007, Basshunter collaborated with DJ Mental Theo's Bazzheadz on "Now You're Gone". In 2008, he released a cover version of "Please Don't Go" by KC and the Sunshine Band and "All I Ever Wanted", followed by his third studio album, Now You're Gone, on 14 July. For the album, Basshunter worked with Scott Simons and Robert Uhlmann, who produced most of the songs. Simons also wrote "Dream Girl" and "In Her Eyes". The album's deluxe edition contained a bonus single, "Walk on Water", and was released in 2009. Francis Hill co-wrote "Bass Creator" and "Camilla". A single, "Angel in the Night", and cover of "I Miss You" by Westlife were later released.

Basshunter again worked with Simons on "Every Morning" and "I Promised Myself", the first single from Bass Generation, released on 28 September 2009. He continued working with Hill, who wrote "I Still Love", and Uhlmann, who produced "Plane to Spain" and "Day & Night". Hill and Simons co-wrote "Can You". Simons also co-wrote "I Can't Deny" and "Numbers"; he and Basshunter wrote and produced "On Our Side". A compilation album, The Early Bedroom Sessions, was released on 3 December 2012. The 23-track album consists of songs from The Old Shit and The Bassmachine, plus seven additional tracks comprising early single releases and previously unreleased songs.

Basshunter's fourth studio album, Calling Time, was released on 13 May 2013. Its tracklisting included four songs that had been released as singles over the preceding three years: "Saturday", "Northern Light", "Dream on the Dancefloor" and "Fest i hela huset", a track that Basshunter had recorded with contestants on the fifth season of the reality television series Big Brother. Two further songs from Calling Time were released as singles: "Crash & Burn" in June 2013, and the album's title track in September that year. The remaining songs included collaborations with the singers Dulce María—who featured on "Wake Up Beside Me"—and Sandra Gee, who provided vocals on the track "Dirty".

== Released songs ==
Key
†	Written or produced by Basshunter
‡	Single
*	Promotional single
+	Compilation album song
^	Cover version
Non-album single	Released as a single, but did not appear on an album
Non-album song	Did not appear on an album

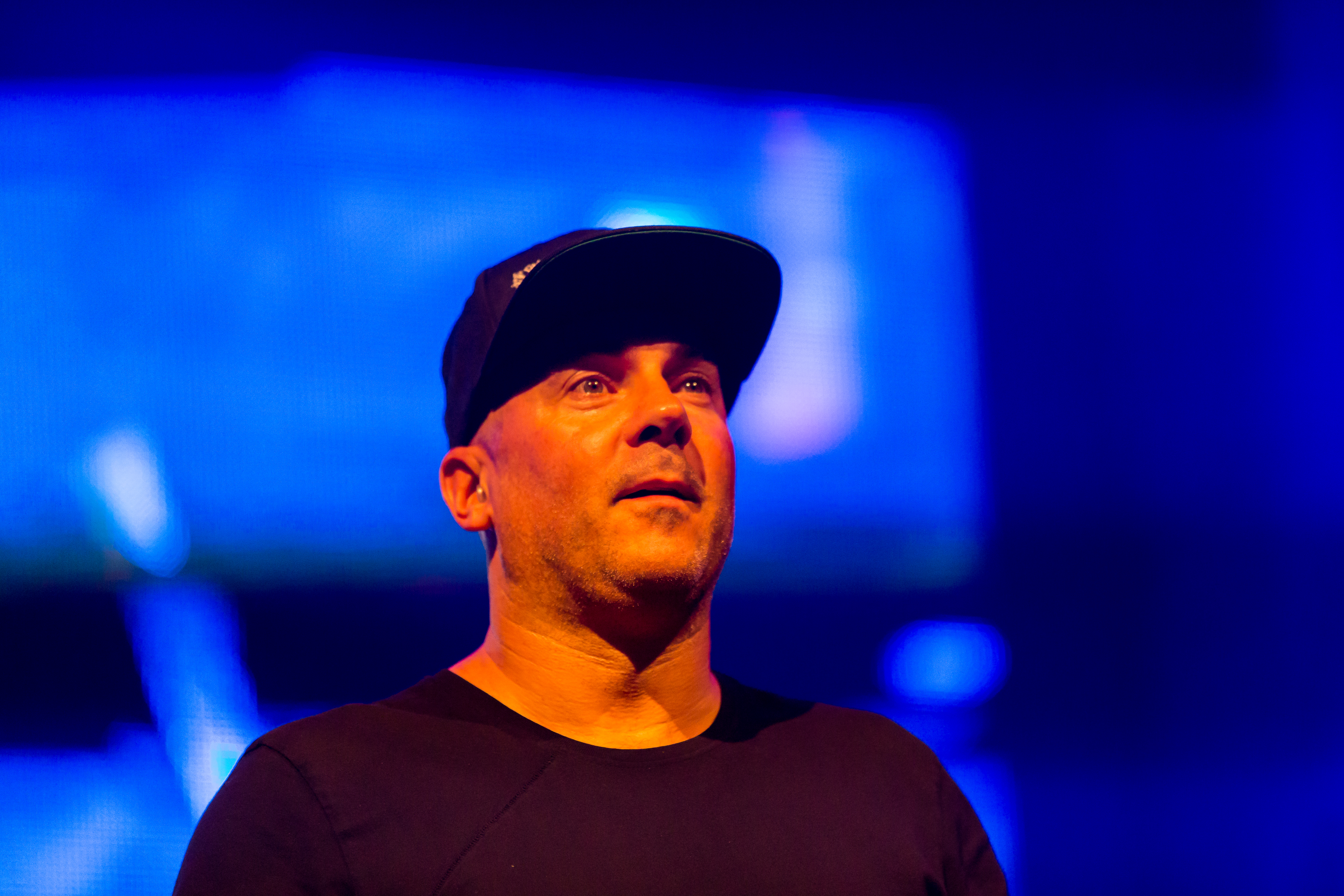
DJ Mental Theo's Bazzheadz collaborated with Basshunter on "Now You're Gone".

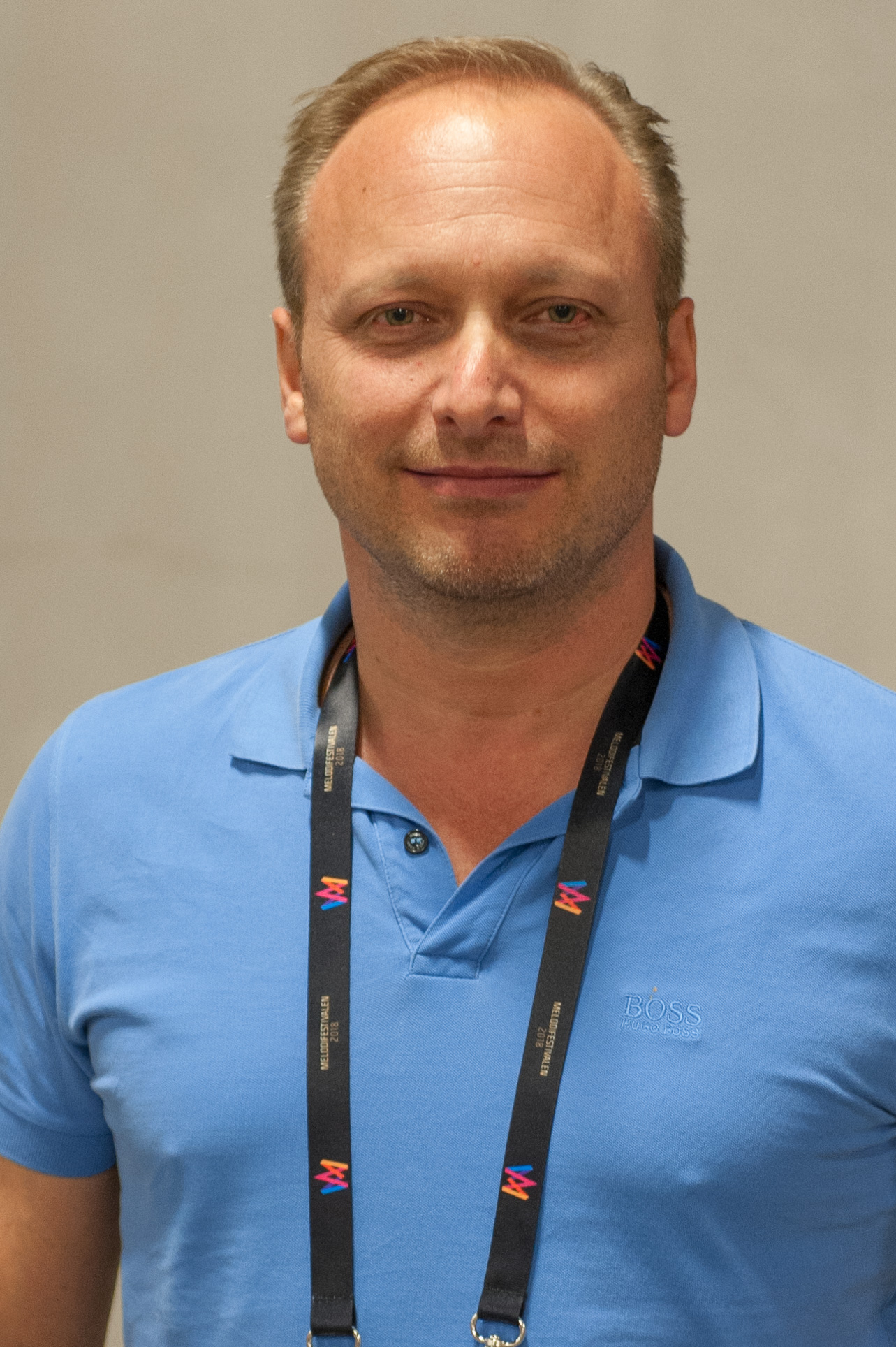
As of 2022, Robert Uhlmann has produced 16 songs with Basshunter.

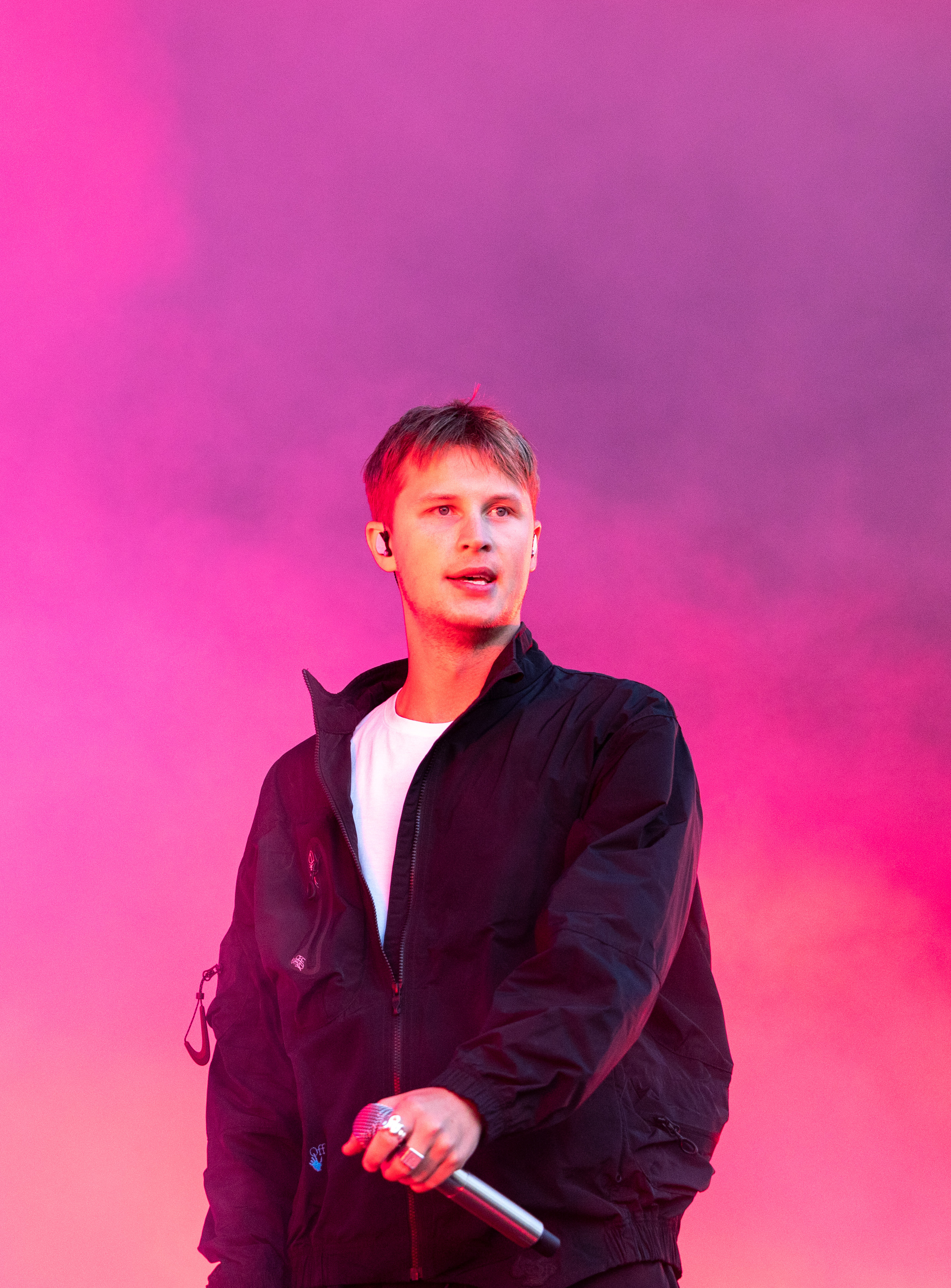
Victor Leksell collaborated with Basshunter on "Ingen kan slå (Boten Anna)".

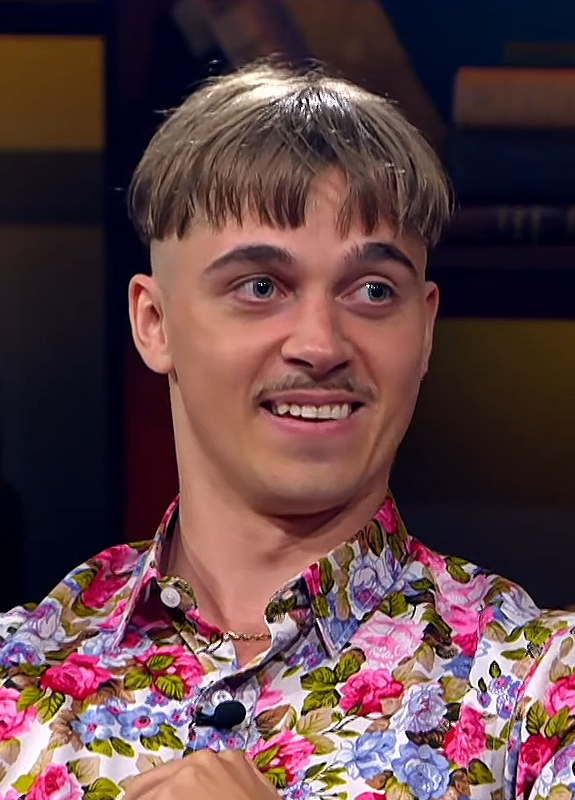
Basshunter collaborated with Käärijä on "Ja eller nej".

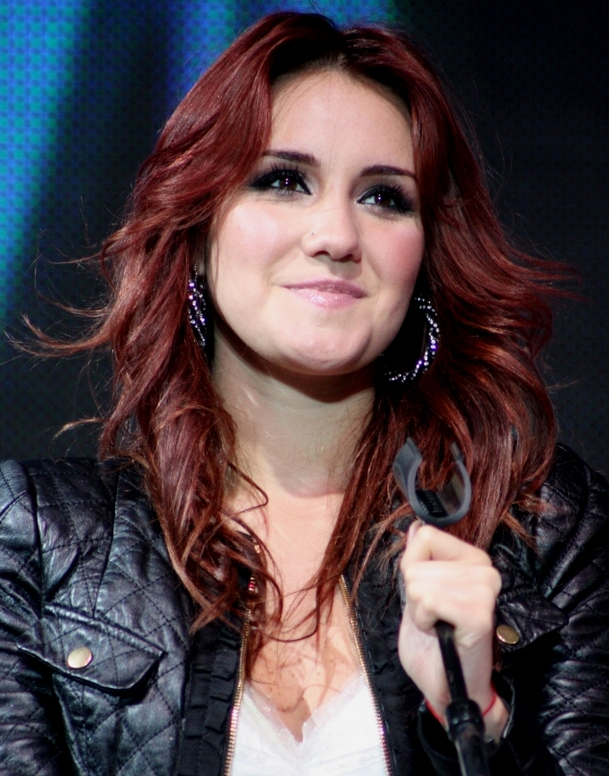
Dulce María featured on "Wake Up Beside Me".

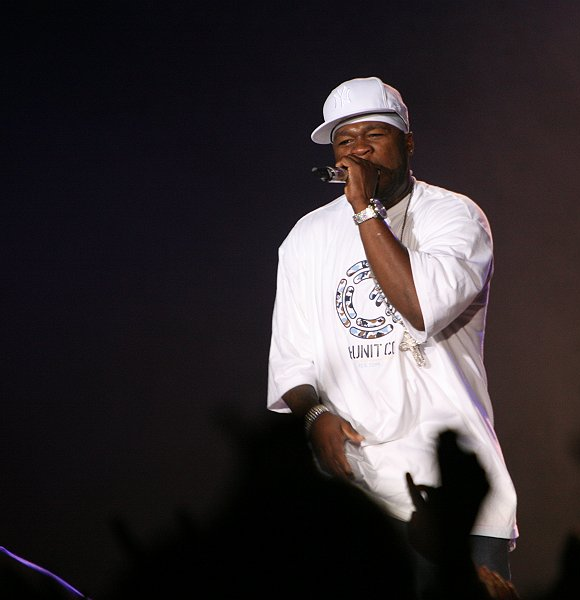
"In da Club" was first recorded by 50 Cent.

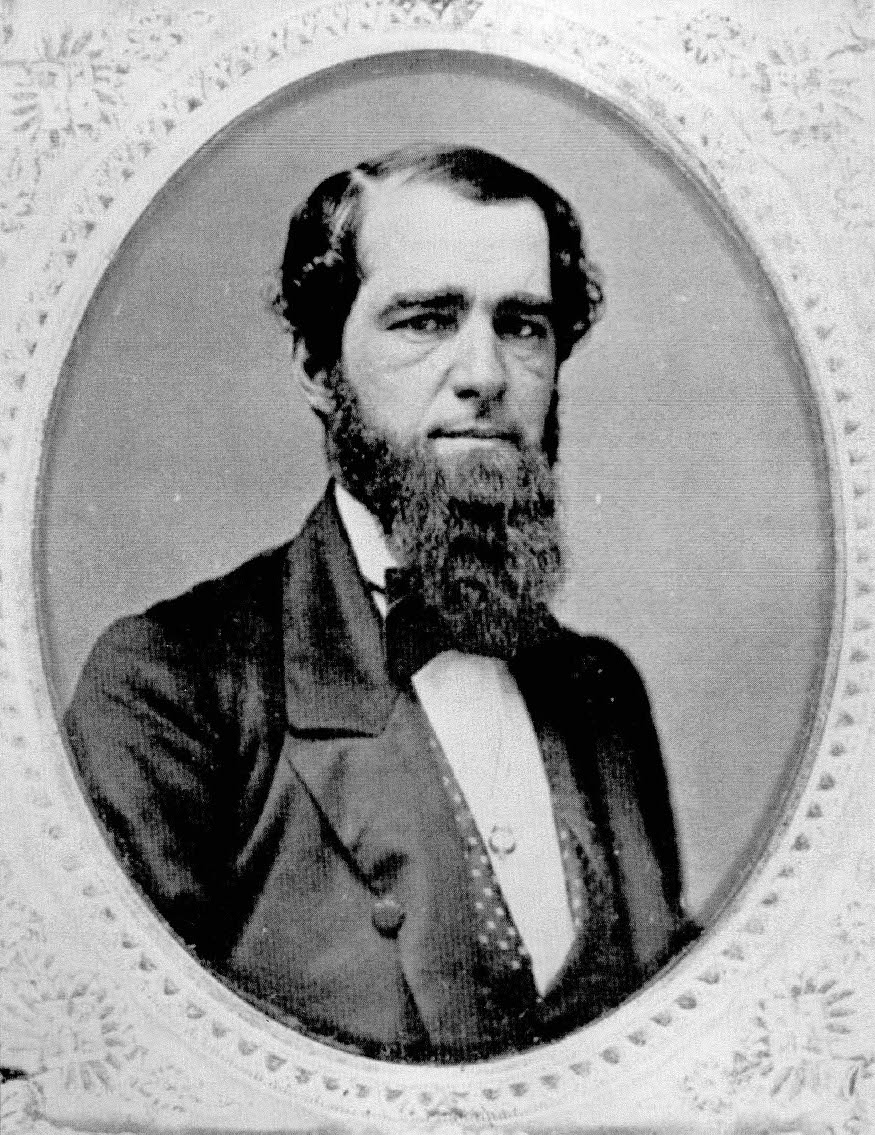
Basshunter covered James Lord Pierpont's "Jingle Bells" in 2006.

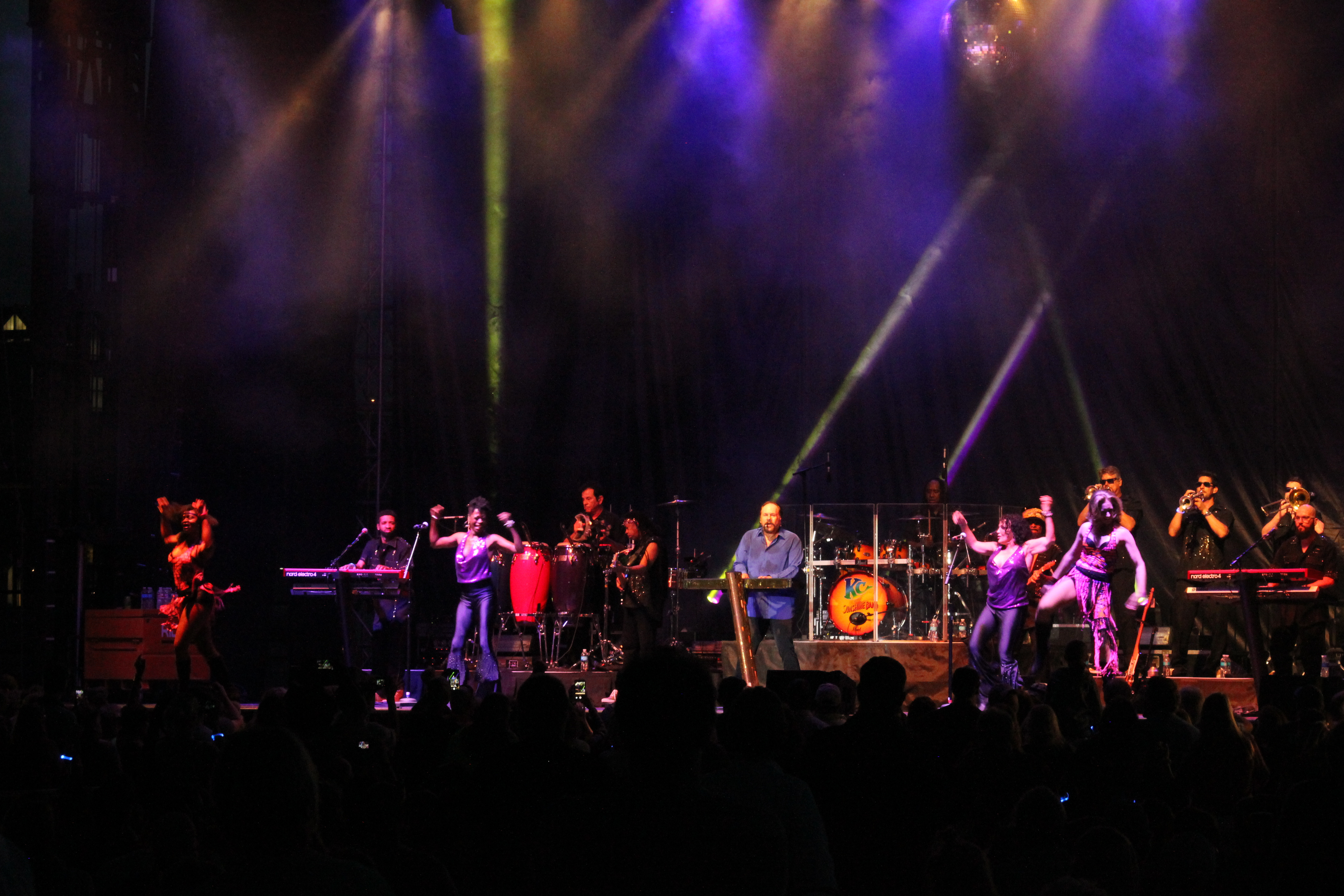
KC and the Sunshine Band originally recorded "Please Don't Go".

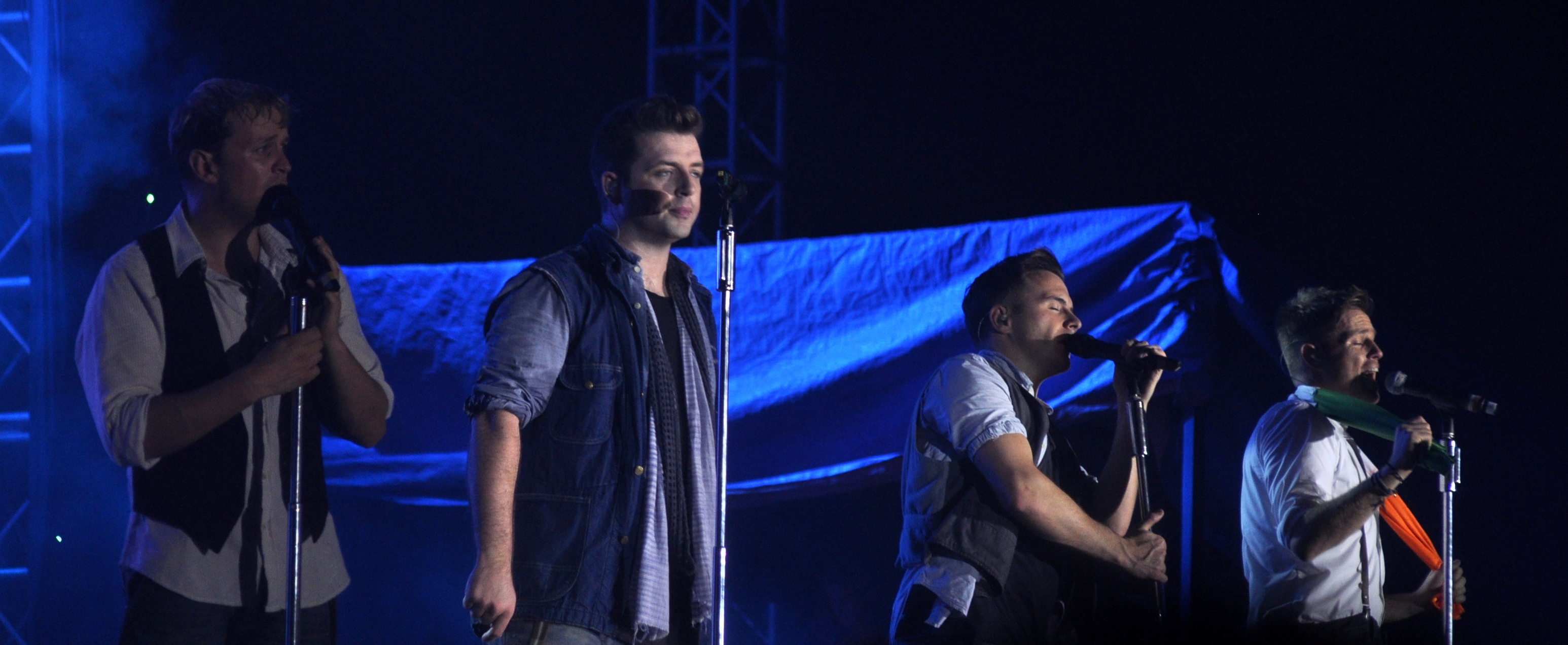
Basshunter included a version of Westlife's "Miss You" on Now You're Gone – The Album.

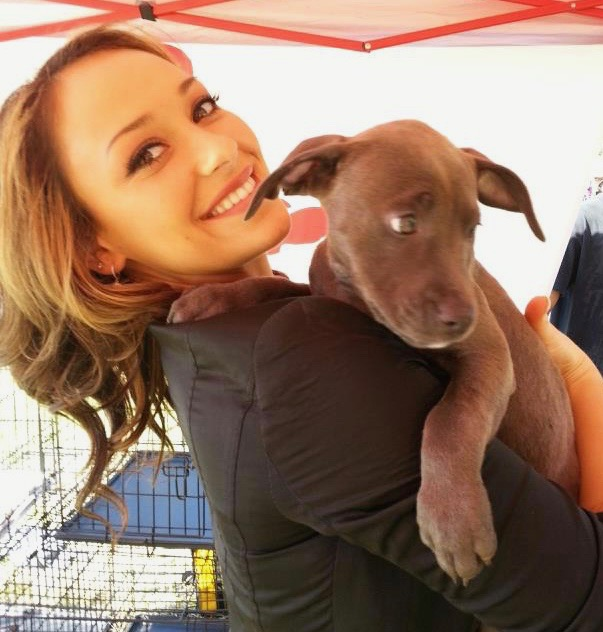
Basshunter covered Kaci's "Will Learn to Love Again" in 2009.

Name of song, artist(s), writer(s), producer(s), album and year of release
Title	Artist(s)	Writer(s)	Producer(s)	Album	Year	Ref.
"Al final" ‡	Basshunter featuring Dani Mata	Basshunter †	Unknown	Disco Estrella Vol. 12	2009	
"All I Ever Wanted" ‡	Basshunter	David Le Roy; Jean Christophe Belval; Scott Simons	Basshunter; Robert Uhlmann; Scott Simons	Now You're Gone – The Album	2008	
"Angel in the Night" ‡	Basshunter	Basshunter †	Basshunter; Robert Uhlmann; Scott Simons	Now You're Gone – The Album	2008	
"Angels Ain't Listening" ‡	Basshunter	Basshunter; Jimmy Joker; Thomas G:son; Bilal Hajji	Jimmy Joker	Non-album single	2020	
"Bass Creator"	Basshunter	Basshunter; Francis Hill	Basshunter; Robert Uhlmann; Scott Simons	Now You're Gone – The Album	2008	
"Bass Worker"	Basshunter	Basshunter †		The Bassmachine	2004	
"The Bassmachine"	Basshunter	Basshunter †		The Bassmachine	2004	
"Beer in the Bar"	Basshunter	Basshunter †	Unknown	LOL (Note: Released on 2008 release of LOL album.)	2008	
"Between the Two of Us"	Basshunter	Basshunter †		LOL (Note: Released on the later 2006 release of LOL album.)	2006	
"The Big Show"	Basshunter	Basshunter †		The Bassmachine	2004	
"Boten Anna" ‡ (Note: Basshunter recorded "Boten Anna" also in German. Both versions contains two lines in English.)	Basshunter	Basshunter †		LOL (Note: Originally released on single "Welcome to Rainbow" was later included on the LOL album in modified version and Now You're Gone – The Album as bonus track.)	2006	
"Calling Time" ‡	Basshunter	Scott Simons; Basshunter		Calling Time	2013	
"Camilla" (Note: Basshunter recorded "Camilla" in Swedish and English.)	Basshunter	Basshunter; Francis Hill (Note: Refers to English version released on Now You're Gone – The Album, Basshunter solely written 2007 Swedish version and this version from second CD of Bass Generation.)	Basshunter; Robert Uhlmann; Scott Simons (Note: Refers to English version released on Now You're Gone – The Album. Swedish version released on second CD of Bass Generation was produced by Basshunter and Robert Uhlmann.)	Now You're Gone – The Album	2008	
"Can You"	Basshunter	Basshunter; Scott Simons; Francis Hill	Basshunter †	Bass Generation	2009	
"The Celtic Harmony & the Chilling Acid"	Basshunter	Basshunter †		The Old Shit	2006	
"Contact by Bass"	Basshunter	Basshunter †		The Bassmachine	2004	
"Counterstrike the Mp3" (Note: Basshunter published "Counterstrike the Mp3" as "Counter Strike" on VK.)	Basshunter	Basshunter †		The Old Shit	2006	
"Crash & Burn" ‡	Basshunter	Adam Baptiste; Basshunter	Basshunter †	Calling Time	2013	
"Day & Night"	Basshunter	Basshunter; Scott Simons	Basshunter; Robert Uhlmann	Bass Generation	2009	
"Dirty"	Basshunter featuring Sandra	Basshunter; Sandra Gundstedt	Basshunter †	Calling Time	2013	
"Don't Walk Away"	Basshunter	Basshunter †	Basshunter; Scott Simons	Bass Generation	2009	
"DotA"	Basshunter	David Le Roy; Jean Christophe Belval	Basshunter	Non-album single	2007	
"Dream Girl"	Basshunter	Scott Simons	Basshunter; Scott Simons; Robert Uhlmann	Now You're Gone – The Album	2008	
"Dream on the Dancefloor" ‡	Basshunter	Scott Simons; Eric Turner; Basshunter (Note: According to ACE Repertory and BMI Repertoire data, "Dream on the Dancefloor" was written by Scott Simons, Basshunter, Eric Turner and Robert Uhlmann.)	Basshunter; Scott Simons	Calling Time	2012	
"Elinor" ‡ (Note: Basshunter published "Elinor" as "All in Elinor" on SoundCloud.)	Basshunter	Basshunter †		Non-album single	2013	
"End the Lies" ‡	Basshunter and Alien Cut	Christian Zangaro; David Jassy; Davide Maresca; Fabio Adamo; Basshunter; Robert Uhlmann	Basshunter; Robert Uhlmann; Alien Cut	Non-album single	2022	
"Every Morning" ‡	Basshunter	Basshunter; Scott Simons	Basshunter †	Bass Generation	2009	
"Evil Beat" (Note: "Evil Beat" was released as "The Beat" on the later 2006 release of LOL album.)	Basshunter	Basshunter †		LOL (Note: Originally released as "Evil Beat" on single "Welcome to Rainbow".)	2006	
"Far Away" ^	Basshunter	Paul Hutsch; Eric Vyskocil	Basshunter †	Calling Time	2013	
"Far from Home"	Basshunter	Basshunter †		Bass Generation	2009	
"Fest folk"	Basshunter	Basshunter †		The Bassmachine	2004	
"Fest i hela huset" ‡	Basshunter versus Big Brother	Basshunter; Big Brother (Note: According to ACE Repertory data, "Fest i hela huset" was written by Basshunter, Simon Danielsson, Gurkan Gasi, Sara Jönsson and Sonia Kamau.)	Basshunter †	Calling Time	2011	
"Festfolk" [2006 Remix]	Basshunter	Basshunter; PJ Harmony		LOL	2006	
"Go Down Now" +	Basshunter	Basshunter †		The Early Bedroom Sessions (Note: Originally included on single "Angel in the Night".)	2008	
"Hallå där" ‡ (Note: Released as "Hello There" on the later 2006 release of LOL album.)	Basshunter	Basshunter †		LOL	2006	
"Här kommer Lennart"	Basshunter	Basshunter †		The Old Shit	2006	
"Hardstyle Drops"	Basshunter	Basshunter †		Now You're Gone – The Album (Note: Originally released as "Welcome to Rainbow" (Hardstyle Remix) on single "Welcome to Rainbow" was released on the later release of Now You're Gone – The Album.)	2006	
"Home" ‡	Basshunter	Cedric Lorrain; Javier Gonzalez; Basshunter; Linnea Deb; Robert Uhlmann; Thomas G:son	Jakob Redze	Non-album single	2019	
"I Came Here to Party"	Basshunter	Basshunter; Adam Baptiste; Najah	Basshunter †	Calling Time	2013	
"I Can Walk on Water I Can Fly" *	Basshunter	Basshunter †	Unknown	Non-album song	2007	
"I Can Walk on Water"	Basshunter	Basshunter †	Basshunter; Robert Uhlmann	Now You're Gone – The Album	2008	
"I Can't Deny"	Basshunter featuring Lauren	Basshunter; Scott Simons	Basshunter †	Bass Generation	2009	
"I Know U Know"	Basshunter	Basshunter †		Bass Generation	2009	
"I Miss You" ‡ ^	Basshunter	Rami Jacobi; Jake Schulze	Basshunter; Scott Simons; Robert Uhlmann	Now You're Gone – The Album	2008	
"I Promised Myself" ‡ ^	Basshunter	Nick Kamen	Basshunter; Scott Simons	Bass Generation	2009	
"I Still Love"	Basshunter	Basshunter; Francis Hill	Basshunter †	Bass Generation	2009	
"I Will Learn to Love Again" ^	Basshunter featuring Stunt	Diane Warren	Basshunter; Scott Simons	Bass Generation	2009	
"I'm Your Basscreator"	Basshunter	Basshunter †		LOL	2006	
"I've Got You Now"	Basshunter	Basshunter †		Calling Time	2013	
"In da Club 2004" (Note: Original 50 Cent's "In da Club" was written by 50 Cent, Dr. Dre and Mike Elizondo.)	Basshunter	Unknown		Non-album song	2004	
"In Her Eyes"	Basshunter	Basshunter; Scott Simons	Basshunter; Scott Simons; Robert Uhlmann	Now You're Gone – The Album	2008	
"Ingen kan slå (Boten Anna)" ‡	Basshunter, Victor Leksell	Basshunter; Victor Leksell (Note: According to ACE Repertory data, "Ingen kan slå (Boten Anna)" was written by Basshunter, Victor Leksell and Pontus Persson.)	Basshunter; Pontus Persson; Robert Uhlmann	Non-album single	2023	
"Ja eller nej" ‡	Käärijä x Basshunter	Aleksi Nurmi; Käärijä; Sonny Kylä-Liuhala	Aleksi Nurmi; KiRo	Non-album single	2026	
"Jingle Bells" ‡ ^ (Note: Original "Jingle Bells" was written by James Lord Pierpont.)	Basshunter	Basshunter †		LOL (Note: Released on the later 2006 release of LOL album as bonus track.)	2006	
"Lawnmover to Music" (Note: "Lawnmover to Music" was released as "From Lawnmower to Music" on the later release of Calling Time album. Basshunter published "Lawnmover to Music" as "From Lawnmover to Music Master" on YouTube.)	Basshunter	Basshunter †		Calling Time	2013	
"Life Speaks to Me" ‡	Basshunter	Basshunter; Mohombi; Lucky Luke; Sickotoy	Lucky Luke; Alexandru Cotoi	Non-album single	2021	
"Love You More" ^	Basshunter	Lucia Holm; Paul Carnell	Basshunter; Scott Simons; Robert Uhlmann	Now You're Gone – The Album	2008	
"Mange kommer hem till dig" ‡	Mange Makers	Basshunter; Max Christensson; Max Henriksson; Didrik Rastbäck; Wrethov	Unknown	Non-album single	2015	
"Masterpiece" ‡	Basshunter	Alex Argento; Basshunter; Robert Uhlmann (Note: According to ACE Repertory data, "Masterpiece" was written by Vasileios Alexis, Basshunter and Robert Uhlmann.)		Non-album single	2018	
"Megamix" *	Basshunter	Unknown		Non-album song	2008	
"Mellan oss två"	Basshunter	Basshunter †		LOL	2006	
"MoonTrip"	Basshunter	Basshunter †		The Old Shit	2006	
"The Night"	Basshunter	Basshunter †		The Old Shit	2006	
"Northern Light" ‡ (Note: Basshunter published music video to "Northern Light" as "Northern Lights" on YouTube.)	Basshunter	Basshunter; Minna Benne Elo; Marcus Wickström	Basshunter †	Calling Time	2012	
"Now You're Gone" ‡	Basshunter (Note: Featured participation of Mental Theo was mentioned in the later releases of "Now You're Gone" single.)	Basshunter; DJ Mental Theo's Bazzheadz	Basshunter; Robert Uhlmann (Note: Robert Uhlmann not credited on the special version of LOL album.)	LOL (Note: Originally released on 2008 release of LOL album it was released on Now You're Gone – The Album.)	2007	
"Numbers"	Basshunter	Basshunter; Scott Simons	Basshunter †	Bass Generation (Note: "Numbers" is a hidden track.)	2009	
"On Our Side"	Basshunter	Basshunter; Scott Simons		Bass Generation	2009	
"Open Your Eyes" (Note: Basshunter published demo version of "Open Your Eyes" as "Open My Eyes" on SoundCloud.)	Basshunter	Basshunter †		Calling Time (Note: Released on British and Irish version of album.)	2013	
"Pitchy" (Note: "Pitchy" was released as "Pitchy Track" on the later release of Calling Time album.)	Basshunter	Basshunter †		Calling Time	2013	
"Plane to Spain"	Basshunter	Basshunter †	Basshunter; Robert Uhlmann	Bass Generation	2009	
"Please Don't Go" ‡ ^	Basshunter	Harry Wayne Casey; Richard Finch	Basshunter; Robert Uhlmann; Scott Simons	Now You're Gone – The Album	2008	
"Professional Party People"	Basshunter	Basshunter †		LOL	2006	
"Rainbow Stars" +	Basshunter	Basshunter †		The Early Bedroom Sessions	2012	
"Rise My Love"	Basshunter	Basshunter †		Calling Time	2013	
"Russia Privjet" *	Basshunter	Basshunter † (Note: Modified version of "Russia Privjet" released on Now You're Gone – The Album was produced by Basshunter and Robert Uhlmann.)		LOL (Note: Originally released on the later 2006 release of LOL album and modified version was included on the Now You're Gone – The Album.)	2006	
"Saturday" ‡	Basshunter	Erick Morillo; Mark Quashie; Cutfather; Thomas Troelsen; Engelina	Cutfather; Thomas Troelsen	Calling Time	2010	
"Sitter i luren och väntar på Adam Alsing" +	Basshunter	Basshunter	Unknown	Mix Megapol 1	2008	
"Smells Like Blade"	Basshunter	Basshunter †		The Old Shit	2006	
"Stay Alive"	Basshunter	Basshunter †		The Old Shit	2006	
"Storm of Fantasy"	Basshunter	Basshunter †		The Old Shit	2006	
"Strand Tylösand"	Basshunter	Basshunter †		LOL	2006	
"Sverige"	Basshunter	Basshunter †		LOL	2006	
"Syndrome de Abstenencia" *	Basshunter	Basshunter †		The Bassmachine	2004	
"T-Rex [Jurassic Park]"	Basshunter	Basshunter †		The Old Shit	2006	
"Train Station"	Basshunter	Basshunter †		The Bassmachine	2004	
"Trance Up" + (Note: "Trance Up" (Short Extended Mix) was released on promotional single "Syndrome de Abstenencia".)	Basshunter	Basshunter †		The Early Bedroom Sessions	2012	
"Transformation Bass"	Basshunter	Basshunter †		The Bassmachine	2004	
"The True Sound"	Basshunter	Basshunter †		The Bassmachine	2004	
"Try to Stop Us" +	Basshunter	Basshunter †		The Early Bedroom Sessions	2012	
"Utan stjärnorna" (Note: "Utan stjärnorna" released as "Without Stars" on the later 2006 release of LOL album was released as "Without Stars" (Swedish Version) on second CD of Bass Generation.)	Basshunter	Basshunter; PJ Harmony		LOL	2006	
"Var är jag" (Note: "Var är jag" was released as "GPS" on the later 2006 release of LOL album.)	Basshunter	Basshunter; PJ Harmony		LOL	2006	
"Vi sitter i Ventrilo och spelar DotA" ‡ (Note: "Vi sitter i Ventrilo och spelar DotA" contains few lines in English.)	Basshunter	David Le Roy; Jean Christophe Belval (Note: Basshunter wrote Swedish lyrics.)	Basshunter †	LOL (Note: Modified version of "Vi sitter i Ventrilo och spelar DotA" containing spoken issue from beginning of the music video for "Vi sitter i Ventrilo och spelar DotA" was included on the Now You're Gone – The Album as bonus track titled "DotA".)	2006	
"Vifta med händerna" ‡ (Note: Released as "Throw Your Hands Up" on the later 2006 release of LOL album.)	Basshunter versus Patrik & Lillen	Basshunter † (Note: According to ACE Repertory data, "Vifta med händerna" was written by Basshunter, Patrik Lindberg and Emil Wahlström.)		LOL	2006	
"Wacco Will Kick Your Ass" + *	Basshunter	Basshunter †		The Early Bedroom Sessions	2005	
"Waiting for the Moon"	Basshunter	Basshunter †		The Old Shit	2006	
"Wake Up Beside Me"	Basshunter featuring Dulce María	Basshunter; Dulce María		Calling Time	2013	
"Walk on Water" ‡	Basshunter	Basshunter †		Now You're Gone – The Album (Note: "Walk on Water" was released on Deluxe Edition of album.)	2009	
"The Warpzone"	Basshunter	Basshunter †		The Bassmachine	2004	
"We Are the Waccos"	Basshunter	Basshunter; PJ Harmony		LOL	2006	
"Welcome to Rainbow"	Basshunter	Basshunter †		Now You're Gone – The Album (Note: Originally released as a single, "Welcome to Rainbow" was released on the later release of Now You're Gone – The Album.)	2006	
"Why"	Basshunter	Basshunter †		Bass Generation	2009	
"Wizard Elements" +	Basshunter	Basshunter †		The Early Bedroom Sessions	2012	
"You're Not Alone"	Basshunter	Basshunter; Maja	Basshunter; Chris Delay	Calling Time	2013	

== Unreleased songs ==
Name of song, artist(s), writer(s), producer(s), year of publication or announcement and note
Title	Artist(s)	Writer(s)	Producer(s)	Year	Note	Ref.
"Boten Adam"	Basshunter	Adam Alsing; Basshunter	Unknown	Unknown (Note: The song become one of the most downloaded ringtones in Sweden in October 2006.)	Registered at ACE Repertory.	
"Hard Dance"	Basshunter	Unknown		2013	Demo published on SoundCloud.	
"I'm So in Love with You"	Basshunter	Basshunter	Unknown	Unknown	Registered at ACE Repertory.	
"The Indian"	Basshunter	Unknown		2016	Published on VK.	
"Jag älskar dig"	Basshunter	Basshunter	Unknown	Unknown	Registered at ACE Repertory.	
"Musikhjälpen"	Basshunter	Basshunter	Unknown	2008	Song recorded for Musikhjälpen.	
"Shine Like the Northern Light"	Basshunter	Unknown		2012	Published on VK.	
"Shut the Fuck Up"	Basshunter	Unknown		2016	Published on VK.	
"Tetris"	Basshunter	Basshunter	Unknown	Unknown	Registered at ACE Repertory. Published on VK.	
"Tour"	Basshunter	Unknown	Basshunter	2016	Announced during interview.	
"Trance Megamix 2005"	Basshunter	Basshunter	Unknown	Unknown	Registered at ACE Repertory.	
