= Bass Generation =

Studio album by Basshunter
- Released: 28 September 2009
- Recorded: 2009
- Genre: Eurodance
- Length: 46:13
- Label: Hard2Beat; Warner Music Sweden; Ultra (United States)
- Producer: Basshunter

Basshunter chronology
Now You're Gone – The Album (2008)	Bass Generation (2009)	The Early Bedroom Sessions (2012)

Singles from Bass Generation
- 1. "Every Morning" Released: 21 September 2009; 2. "I Promised Myself" Released: 30 November 2009

Bass Generation is the fourth studio album by Swedish musician Basshunter. It was first released on 28 September 2009, a week after the album's lead single "Every Morning". The album reached No. 2 in New Zealand and No. 7 in South Africa.

== Background ==
In early 2009, Basshunter started the process of recording the album. A comment was posted on his official website in April that he was "back in the studio to do some work on the new album." On 1 July 2009, it was announced that Basshunter would be releasing a brand new single titled "Every Morning" on 21 September with the new album, Bass Generation, being released one week later on 28 September. On 1 September 2009, the official album artwork and track listing was posted on Hard2Beat.com. On 15 September, it was revealed on Basshunter's official Bebo profile that the album would also be released as a two-disc set.

He received a lot of requests to create a new "Tetris" song, so he recorded "Plane to Spain" which is one of his favourite songs from the album. At first he thought of making it instrumental, but it wouldn't be that salable.

== Release ==
In early September 2009, before the album was released the song "Numbers" was released to the public as a free download via Basshunter's official Bebo profile. The album release date was eventually moved up a week for unknown reasons to 28 September 2009, along with the single "Every Morning", which was released on 21 September 2009.

== Promotion ==
To promote the album, the Basshunter Album Artwork Competition was set up on 10 August 2009, in which fans could design and upload their own cover art for the "Bass Generation" album to Basshunters Bebo profile. The winners artwork would be signed, framed and presented to them by Basshunter at the Bass Generation tour. The winning entry was revealed on 11 September 2009.

=== Bass Generation Tour ===
Basshunter also set out on the Bass Generation Tour in October 2009 in support of the album. The 10 date UK tour was announced on 1 July 2009. Tickets went on sale 3 July 2009.

=== Tour dates ===
Date	City	Venue
United Kingdom
14 October 2009	Bristol	O_{2} Academy Bristol
15 October 2009	Manchester	Manchester Apollo
16 October 2009	Birmingham	O_{2} Academy Birmingham
17 October 2009	Sheffield	O_{2} Academy Sheffield
19 October 2009	Edinburgh	Edinburgh Picture House
20 October 2009	Aberdeen	Music Hall
21 October 2009	Glasgow	O_{2} Academy Glasgow
22 October 2009	Newcastle	O_{2} Academy Newcastle
24 October 2009	London	O_{2} Shepherd's Bush Empire
25 October 2009	Norwich	University of East Anglia
Ireland
26 December 2009	Castlebar	Royal Theatre & Event Centre
27 December 2009	Dublin	The Academy

== Singles ==
- "Every Morning", was the first single released from the album. It was released on 21 September 2009. The song was first performed at the UK Dance Nation Tour in April 2009. The first radio play of the track was on the BBC Radio 1 Switch program on 19 July 2009. The song is about a former girlfriend of Basshunter's. It has so far reached the top 20 in the UK and New Zealand. Its accompanying music video was filmed on location in Majorca. It premiered on 12 August 2009.
- Before the album release, "Numbers" was confirmed to be the second single. But in November it was changed. "I Promised Myself", is the second single released from the album. The single was released on 30 November, the music video has already been released.
- According to a commercial from Hard2Beat, "Why" was set to be the third single. In April 2010 "Day & Night" was added to radio stations across the UK. In May 2010 it was announced that there will not be a third single from Bass Generation and a new song, which was named "Saturday" was released in July.

== Reception ==
Professional ratings
Review scores
Source	Rating
AllMusic	3/5 stars
The Daily Reveille	B+

Editor from Arbetarbladet said that "Every Morning" has wonderful lyrics and is unfortunately among the better on the album. Erika Hobart from Seattle Weekly described Bass Generation as sleeker than previous Basshunter albums, but also added that it will impress club visitors more than music critics.

== Chart performance ==
Bass Generation debuted at number 16 on the UK Albums Chart with sale of 15,046 copies.

== Track listing ==
Bass Generation
No.	Title	Writer(s)	Producer(s)	Length
1.	"Every Morning"	Jonas Altberg; Scott Simons	Altberg	3:18
2.	"I Promised Myself"	Nick Kamen	Altberg; Simons	2:37
3.	"Why"	Altberg	Altberg	3:11
4.	"I Will Learn to Love Again" (featuring Stunt)	Diane Warren	Altberg; Simons	3:06
5.	"Don't Walk Away"	Altberg	Altberg; Simons	3:01
6.	"I Still Love"	Altberg; Francis Hill	Altberg	3:33
7.	"Day & Night"	Altberg; Simons	Altberg; Robert Uhlmann	2:55
8.	"I Can't Deny" (featuring Lauren)	Altberg; Simons	Altberg	3:07
9.	"Far from Home"	Altberg	Altberg	4:10
10.	"I Know U Know"	Altberg	Altberg	2:45
11.	"On Our Side"	Altberg; Simons	Altberg; Simons	3:54
12.	"Can You"	Altberg; Simons; Hill	Altberg	2:24
13.	"Plane to Spain"	Altberg	Altberg; Uhlmann	3:41
14.	"Every Morning" (Michael Mind Edit)	Altberg; Simons	Altberg	2:57
15.	"Numbers" (hidden track)	Altberg; Simons	Altberg	3:20

Bass Generation – Bonus disc
No.	Title	Writer(s)	Length
1.	"Now You're Gone" (featuring DJ Mental Theo's Bazzheadz) (DJ Alex Extended Mix)	Altberg; Theo Nabuurs	5:43
2.	"All I Ever Wanted" (Ultra DJ's Remix)	David Le Roy; Jean Christophe Belval; Simons	5:35
3.	"Angel in the Night" (Headhunters Remix)	Altberg	5:33
4.	"I Miss You" (Hyperzone Remix)	Rami Jacobi; Jacob Schulze	5:35
5.	"Please Don't Go" (Bad Behaviour Remix)	Harry Wayne Casey; Richard Finch	6:45
6.	"Walk on Water" (Ultra DJ's Remix)	Altberg	5:19
7.	"Every Morning" (Raindropz! Remix)	Altberg	4:54
8.	"Camilla" (Swedish version)	Altberg	3:22
9.	"Without Stars" (Swedish version)	Altberg	3:51

Bass Generation – iTunes bonus video
No.	Title	Writer(s)	Length
24.	"Every Morning" (music video)	Altberg; Simons	3:33

Notes

- "Numbers" is not included on digital versions.

== Charts ==
=== Weekly charts ===
Weekly chart performance for Bass Generation
Chart (2009)	Peak position
Danish Albums (Hitlisten)	39
European Albums (Billboard)	58
French Albums (SNEP)	41
Ireland (IRMA)	16
New Zealand (RMNZ)	2
Switzerland (Swiss Hitparade)	73
South Africa (Radio Sonder Grense)	7
United Kingdom (OCC)	16
UK Dance Albums (OCC)	3
UK Independent Albums (OCC)	4
US Top Heatseekers Albums	34
US Dance/Electronic Albums	15

== Certifications ==
Certifications and sales for Bass Generation
Region	Certification	Certified units/sales
United Kingdom (BPI)	Gold	100,000^{‡}
^{‡} Sales+streaming figures based on certification alone.

== Release history ==
Release dates for Bass Generation
Region	Date
New Zealand	28 September 2009
United Kingdom	28 September 2009
