= Tetris (disambiguation) =

Tetris is a tile-matching puzzle video game released in 1985.

Tetris may also refer to:

== Games ==
- List of Tetris variants
  - Tetris (Spectrum HoloByte), a 1988 version for personal computer systems that became the first commercial release of the game
  - Tetris (Atari Games), a 1988 version developed by Atari Games, released for arcade and the NES
  - Tetris (Game Boy video game), a 1989 version released for the Game Boy
  - Tetris (NES video game), a 1989 version released for the Nintendo Entertainment System
  - Tetris (Electronic Arts), a 2006 version released by Electronic Arts for multiple platforms
  - Tetris (2008 video game), a 2008 video game released by PopCap Games for PC, PlayStation Network, Wii, and Nintendo DS
  - Tetris: Axis, also known as Tetris in some regions, a 2011 version released for the Nintendo 3DS

== Film ==
- Tetris - The Movie, a proposed sci-fi adventure movie based on the game
- Tetris (film), a 2023 biopic about the game's development and release

== Music ==
- Tetris theme
- "Tetris" (Doctor Spin song), a 1992 composition based on the game's main theme
- "Tetris", an unreleased song by Basshunter

== See also ==
- Tetoris, a 2024 song by Hiiragi Magnetite
