= Aylar Lie =

Iranian-Norwegian TV personality and poker player (born 1984)

- Born: 12 February 1984 (age 42); Tehran, Iran
- Other name: Sharareh Dianati
- Occupations: TV personality; actress; poker player
- Website: instagram.com/aylarlieofficial/

Aylar Lie (Persian: آیلار لی; born 12 February 1984) is an Iranian-born Norwegian TV personality and professional poker player. She has worked as a music video actress, appearing in several of Swedish musician Basshunter's music videos, and appeared in several TV reality shows. She became famous after participating in the Norwegian Big Brother.

== Early life ==
Aylar Lie was born in 1984 in Tehran, Iran, and moved to Norway when she was 3 years old. After arriving in Norway, her parents separated and Aylar was placed in the custody of the child protective services. After a few years, she was taken into the foster care system. Aylar had moved 18 times before she began elementary school, and until finally she found foster parents. Her biological mother moved to the United States, while her father remained in constant struggle with the Norwegian authorities. Aylar was kidnapped to Iran in 2000, but managed to escape and got back to Norway in March 2002.

She is fluent in Norwegian, Persian, and English.

== Career ==
=== Actress and model ===
Lie started out as a pornographic actress. She starred in 8 adult movies produced summer 2002. When she competed in the finals of the Miss Norway pageant in 2004, she was disqualified from the contest when it was discovered that she had starred in adult films; candidates in the pageant must not have been pictured naked in any commercial production or publication. Her adult film career has made her the target of much criticism, but she used the all the media attention to create a living for herself as a TV personality in Norway.

In a July 2010 interview, Lie stated that she "sorely regrets" having engaged in pornographic acting. She explained that the choice was made while she was going through a difficult time of her life, and she wished she could "erase that from [her] past". She also denied that she was banned from entering her native Iran because of her pornographic background.

Her plans for 2006 included the promotion of her hand-picked team of models, called Team Aylar. The members of Team Aylar originally included Elita Löfblad, Charlotte Fredriksen, Linni Meister, Cathrine Aschim, and Lisa Marie Winther.

=== Appearances ===
In 2010, Lie participated in the 6th season of Skal vi danse?, the Norwegian version of the British dance contest series Strictly Come Dancing.

She was signed to the record label Hard2Beat, after which she released the single "Some People", which features Ocean Drive and DJ Oriska.

== Personal life ==
She started dating Dr. Ozerk Ozan in 2007.

== Filmography ==
=== Feature films ===
List of films, roles and notes
Title	Year	Role	Ref.
Dådyr	2009	Actress	
Yohan: The Child Wanderer	2010	Raya	

=== Music videos ===
- 2006: Sunblock – "First Time"
- 2007: Basshunter – "Now You're Gone"
- 2007: Yousef feat. Aylar – "Mamacita"
- 2008: Basshunter – "All I Ever Wanted"
- 2008: Basshunter – "Angel in the Night"
- 2008: Basshunter – "I Miss You"
- 2009: Basshunter – "Every Morning"
- 2009: Basshunter – "I Promised Myself"
- 2009: Basshunter – "Jingle Bells"
- 2010: Arash feat. Timbuktu, Aylar & Yag – "Dasa Bala"
- 2010: Aylar Lie feat. Ocean Drive – "Some People"
- 2012: Basshunter – "Northern Light"
- 2012: Arash feat. Sean Paul – "She Makes Me Go"

== Television ==
(all Norwegian television appearances except where indicated)

- 2005: Først & sist (guest)
- 2005: Big Brother Norge Sverige (guest appearance / joint Norwegian/Swedish program)
- 2005: Aylar – Ett år i rampelyset (meaning Aylar – A Year in the Spotlight) (as herself)
- 2007: Rikets røst
- 2009: Helt ærlig (guest)
- 2009: 4-stjerners middag halv åtte (participant)
- 2010: Sommertid (guest)
- 2010: Skal vi danse (Dancing with a star) with Åsleik Engmark (finished runners-up)
- Kompani Karlsen
- 2016: Master Chef (finished in the semi final)
- 2017: Farmen (she won the record breaking battle in versus Kari Jaquesson)

== Discography ==
=== Singles ===
==== As lead artist ====
List of singles as lead artist
Title	Year	Album
"Boys Boys Boys"	2006	Non-album single

==== As featured artist ====
List of singles as featured artist
Title	Year	Album
"Mamacita" (Yousef)	2007	Non-album singles
"Some People" (Ocean Drive)	2010	Non-album singles

=== Other songs ===
==== As featured artist ====
List of other songs as featured artist
Title	Year	Album
"Dasa Bala" (Arash feat. Timbuktu, Yag)	2013	Broken Angel. New and the Best

== See also ==
- List of Iranian women models and beauty pageant titleholders
