= Every Morning =

"Every Morning" may refer to:

- "Every Morning" (Sugar Ray song), 1999
- "Every Morning" (Basshunter song), 2009
- "Every Morning", a song by Crash Test Dummies from I Don't Care That You Don't Mind
- "Every Morning", a song by The Cranberries from Wake Up and Smell the Coffee
- "Every Morning", a poem by Suman Pokhrel
