= List of number-one singles of 2008 (Ireland) =

This is a list of the Irish Recorded Music Association's Irish Singles Chart Top 50 number-ones of 2008.

Issue date	Song	Artist	ref
3 January	"When You Believe"	Leon Jackson	
10 January	"Piece of Me"	Britney Spears	
17 January	"Piece of Me"	Britney Spears	
24 January	"Now You're Gone"	Basshunter	
31 January	"Now You're Gone"	Basshunter	
7 February	"Now You're Gone"	Basshunter	
14 February	"Now You're Gone"	Basshunter	
21 February	"Now You're Gone"	Basshunter	
28 February	"Mercy"	Duffy	
6 March	"The Ballad of Ronnie Drew"	U2, The Dubliners, Kíla and A Band of Bowsies	
13 March	"The Ballad of Ronnie Drew"	U2, The Dubliners, Kíla and A Band of Bowsies	
20 March	"Mercy"	Duffy	
27 March	"Low"	Flo Rida featuring T-Pain	
3 April	"The Munster Song"	Glen Keating and Greg Ryan	
10 April	"The Galway Girl"	Sharon Shannon and Mundy	
17 April	"The Galway Girl"	Sharon Shannon and Mundy	
24 April	"The Galway Girl"	Sharon Shannon and Mundy	
1 May	"The Galway Girl"	Sharon Shannon and Mundy	
8 May	"The Galway Girl"	Sharon Shannon and Mundy	
15 May	"4 Minutes"	Madonna featuring Justin Timberlake	
22 May	"Take A Bow"	Rihanna	
29 May	"Take A Bow"	Rihanna	
5 June	"Take A Bow"	Rihanna	
12 June	"Take A Bow"	Rihanna	
19 June	"Forever"	Chris Brown	
26 June	"On Wings"	Leanne Moore	
3 July	"Forever"	Chris Brown	
10 July	"All I Ever Wanted"	Basshunter	
17 July	"All I Ever Wanted"	Basshunter	
24 July	"All Summer Long"	Kid Rock	
31 July	"All Summer Long"	Kid Rock	
7 August	"All Summer Long"	Kid Rock	
14 August	"All Summer Long"	Kid Rock	
21 August	"I Kissed a Girl"	Katy Perry	
28 August	"I Kissed a Girl"	Katy Perry	
4 September	"I Kissed a Girl"	Katy Perry	
11 September	"I Kissed a Girl"	Katy Perry	
18 September	"Sex on Fire"	Kings of Leon	
25 September	"Sex on Fire"	Kings of Leon	
2 October	"So What"	Pink	
9 October	"So What"	Pink	
16 October	"About You Now"	The Saw Doctors	
23 October	"So What"	Pink	
30 October	"Hero"	The X Factor Finalists 2008	
6 November	"Hero"	The X Factor Finalists 2008	
13 November	"Hero"	The X Factor Finalists 2008	
20 November	"Run"	Leona Lewis	
27 November	"Run"	Leona Lewis	
4 December	"Run"	Leona Lewis	
11 December	"Run"	Leona Lewis	
18 December	"Hallelujah"	Alexandra Burke	
25 December	"Hallelujah"	Alexandra Burke	

== See also ==
- 2008 in music
- List of artists who reached number one in Ireland
