= List of best-selling singles and albums of 2008 in Ireland =

This is a list of the best selling singles, albums and as according to IRMA. Further listings can be found here.

== Top selling singles ==
1. "The Galway Girl" - Sharon Shannon & Mundy
2. "Hallelujah" - Alexandra Burke
3. "Low" – Flo Rida feat. T-Pain
4. "Now You're Gone" – Basshunter feat. DJ Mental Theo's Bazzheadz
5. "I Kissed a Girl" – Katy Perry
6. "All Summer Long" – Kid Rock
7. "Rockstar" – Nickelback
8. "Take a Bow" – Rihanna
9. "American Boy" – Estelle feat. Kanye West
10. "Hero" - The X Factor Finalists 2008

== Top selling albums ==
1. Only by the Night – Kings of Leon
2. The Script – The Script
3. Spirit – Leona Lewis
4. The Circus – Take That
5. The Priests – The Priests
6. Viva La Vida or Death and All His Friends – Coldplay
7. Good Girl Gone Bad – Rihanna
8. Mamma Mia! The Movie Soundtrack – Mamma Mia! film cast
9. Rockferry – Duffy
10. Back to Black – Amy Winehouse

Notes:

- *Compilation albums are not included.
