= Miss You (Westlife song) =

1999 song by Westlife

Song by Westlife

from the album Westlife
- Released: 1 November 1999
- Recorded: 1998–99
- Genre: Pop
- Length: 3:53
- Label: BMG; RCA
- Songwriters: Jake Schulze; Rami Yacoub
- Producers: Jake Schulze; Rami Yacoub

"Miss You" is a popular song written by Jake Schulze and Rami Yacoub. It was originally recorded as a ballad, by the Irish boy band Westlife, but was never released as a single. In 2008, it was remade as a dance track by Swedish musician Basshunter becoming a hit single for him as "I Miss You" in 2008, notably in the United Kingdom, Germany and Sweden.

== Westlife song ==
The original song "Miss You" appeared on Irish boy band Westlife's 1999 debut album, Westlife. Although the album produced five different singles "Swear It Again", "If I Let You Go", "Flying Without Wings", the double A-side "I Have a Dream" / "Seasons in the Sun" all in 1999 and "Fool Again" and a remake of "More Than Words" both released in 2000, the song "Miss You" was never released as a single. The Westlife version heavily uses the sound of Irish instruments such as Fiddles and Bagpipes, making up a strong Irish sound. Moreover, the version is structured starting very soft and low until raising to soaring melody, leaving an anthem-like feel.

== Basshunter version ==
"I Miss You"

Single by Basshunter

from the album Now You're Gone – The Album
- Released: 14 December 2008
- Genre: Eurodance; electronic rock
- Length: 2:42 (radio edit); 3:47 (album version)
- Label: Hard2Beat
- Songwriters: Rami Jacobi; Jake Schulze
- Producers: Basshunter; Scott Simons; Robert Uhlmann

Basshunter singles chronology
"Russia Privjet (Hardlanger Remix)" (2008)	"I Miss You" (2008)	"Walk on Water" (2009)

Music video
- "I Miss You" on YouTube

Nearly a decade later, the Swedish musician Basshunter made a cover version of the song as a dance track retitling it as "I Miss You". Basshunter's track "I Miss You" featured lead vocals by the UK singer Lauren Dyson. It appeared on his 2008 album, Now You're Gone – The Album. The track was released as his fifth single from the album following "Now You're Gone" released in 2007, "All I Ever Wanted", Please Don't Go, a cover of KC and the Sunshine Band and "Angel in the Night" all in 2008. The Basshunter single was released on 14 December 2008 and peaked at number 32 on the UK Singles Chart. The song also charted in Germany and Sweden.

=== Music video ===
The music video was added to Hard2Beat's YouTube channel on 5 November 2008 and features a Christmas theme.

=== Chart performance ===
Professional ratings
Review scores
Source	Rating
BBC	3/5 stars

"I Miss You" entered the UK Singles Chart at number 86 on 14 December 2008 and peaked at number 32 week later. "I Miss You" debuted at number 46 on Swedish singles chart on 13 February 2009 and peaked at number 45 in its the last fourth week on chart. In Ireland it didn't enter the Irish singles chart but reached number one on the dance chart.

=== Track listing ===
- 2-track CD single
1. "I Miss You" (Radio Edit)
2. "Basshunter Megamix"
- Maxi CD single
1. "I Miss You" (Radio Edit)
2. "I Miss You" (Fonzerelli Edit)
3. "I Miss You" (Album Edit)
4. "I Miss You" (Fonzerelli Remix)
5. "I Miss You" (Headhunters Remix)
6. "I Miss You" (Video) + other bonus content

=== Personnel ===
Credits

- Rami Jacobi – writer
- Jake Schulze – writer
- Basshunter – producer
- Scott Simons – producer
- Robert Uhlmann – producer
- Lauren Dyson – vocalist

=== Charts ===
2008 weekly chart performance for "I Miss You"
Chart (2008)	Peak position
European Hot 100 Singles (Billboard)	87
UK Singles (Official Charts)	32

2009 weekly chart performance for "I Miss You"
Chart (2009)	Peak position
CIS Airplay (TopHit)	108
Germany (GfK)	70
Ireland (Dance Chart)	1
Sweden (Sverigetopplistan)	46
