= New Zealand top 50 albums of 2009 =

Albums in New Zealand

This is a list of the top-selling albums in New Zealand for 2009 from the Official New Zealand Music Chart's end-of-year chart, compiled by Recorded Music NZ.

== Chart ==
Key
‡ – Album of New Zealand origin

Rank	Artist	Title
1	Susan Boyle	I Dreamed a Dream
2	Taylor Swift	Fearless
3	Lady Gaga	The Fame
4	Gin Wigmore	Holy Smoke^{‡}
5	The Black Eyed Peas	The E.N.D
6	Stan Walker	Introducing^{‡}
7	Fat Freddy's Drop	Dr Boondigga and the Big BW^{‡}
8	Kings of Leon	Only by the Night
9	Ronan Keating	Songs for My Mother
10	Michael Jackson	Michael Jackson's This Is It (album)
11	Pink	Funhouse
12	Various	Hannah Montana: The Movie
13	Green Day	21st Century Breakdown
14	Basshunter	Now You're Gone – The Album
15	Beyonce	I Am... Sasha Fierce
16	Michael Jackson	The Essential Michael Jackson
17	Eminem	Relapse
18	Various	Twilight
19	Fleetwood Mac	The Very Best of Fleetwood Mac
20	Rod Stewart	Soulbook
21	Michael Bublé	Crazy Love
22	Muse	The Resistance
23	Foo Fighters	Greatest Hits
24	Pearl Jam	Backspacer
25	Dave Dobbyn	Beside You: 30 Years of Hits^{‡}
26	Vera Lynn	We'll Meet Again: The Very Best of Vera Lynn
27	U2	No Line on the Horizon
28	Michael Jackson	Number Ones
29	Jason Mraz	We Sing. We Dance. We Steal Things.
30	Shapeshifter	The System Is a Vampire^{‡}
31	Enya	The Very Best of Enya
32	Midnight Youth	The Brave Don't Run^{‡}
33	Lily Allen	It's Not Me, It's You
34	Ladyhawke	Ladyhawke^{‡}
35	Queen	Absolute Greatest
36	Miley Cyrus	The Time of Our Lives
37	The Priests	Harmony
38	Glee cast	Glee: The Music, Volume 1
39	Billy T. James	The Comic Genius Of Billy T James^{‡}
40	Paul Potts	Passione
41	Various	The Twilight Saga: New Moon
42	Paramore	Brand New Eyes
43	Smashproof	The Weekend^{‡}
44	Coldplay	Viva la Vida or Death and All His Friends
45	Various	The Boat That Rocked
46	Them Crooked Vultures	Them Crooked Vultures
47	Annie Lennox	The Annie Lennox Collection
48	Nickelback	Dark Horse
49	Duffy	Rockferry
50	T.I.	Paper Trail
