= The Early Bedroom Sessions =

Compilation album by Basshunter
- Released: 3 December 2012
- Genre: Electronic
- Length: 1:52:56
- Label: Rush Hour; Extensive Music; Ultra Records; 3Beat Productions
- Producer: Basshunter

Basshunter chronology
Bass Generation (2009)	The Early Bedroom Sessions (2012)	Calling Time (2013)

The Early Bedroom Sessions is a second compilation album of electronic music that was recorded by Swedish musician Basshunter. The album is composed of 23 tracks in Swedish and English taken from his earlier releases. It was first released digitally on the Rush Hour label from 3 December 2012 and was later released as a double CD album on Ultra Records on 29 January 2013.

== Release and reception ==
Professional ratings
Review scores
Source	Rating
AllMusic	3/5 stars

Basshunter's previous compilation album The Old Shit was released in 2006. On 27 October 2012 Basshunter announced he would release old material he recorded before he signed to a record label. In November Basshunter announced his tracks would be released in the United States that month. The compilation was released digitally on 3 December by Rush Hour and on 23 January 2013 Ultra Records released the album as a double CD package.

The album contains 23 tracks in Swedish and English and has a running time of 112 minutes and 56 seconds. "Bass Worker" is the opening track and "Wizard Elements" is the closing track. The longest song on the album is "Syndrome de Abstenencia", which runs for six minutes and 35 seconds. "The Bass Machine" is the shortest track, lasting two minutes and 24 seconds. Ten of the album's songs were originally released on previous studio album The Bassmachine (2004); seven songs are from The Old Shit (2006), one song "Go Down Now" was released on the single "Angel in the Night" (2008), "Trance Up" is from promotional single "Syndrome de Abstenencia" (2004), and the promotional single "Wacco Will Kick Your Ass" (2005). The tracks "Rainbow Stars", "Try to Stop Us" and "Wizard Elements" had not been released previously. Track "Counterstrike the Mp3" was dedicated to his Counter-Strike clan. "Wacco Will Kick Your Ass" is also dedicated for his Counter-Strike clan Waccos.

David Jeffries from AllMusic, who also reviewed Basshunter's album Bass Generation, said The Early Bedroom Sessions is dedicated to loyal fans because the tracks it includes are barely connected stylistically and because of problems with the availability of The Bassmachine and The Old Shit. Release of album was also covered by Swedish newspaper Hallandsposten.

== Track listing ==
CD1
No.	Title	Writer(s)	Producer(s)	Length
1.	"Bass Worker" (from The Bassmachine, 2004)	Jonas Altberg	Jonas Altberg	6:16
2.	"Contact By Bass" (from The Bassmachine, 2004)	Altberg	Altberg	3:09
3.	"Festfolk" (from The Bassmachine, 2004)	Altberg	Altberg	4:34
4.	"Go Down Now" (from "Angel in the Night", 2008)	Altberg	Altberg	5:08
5.	"Här kommer Lennart" (from The Old Shit, 2006)	Altberg	Altberg	3:19
6.	"Moon Trip" (from The Old Shit, 2006)	Altberg	Altberg	4:15
7.	"Rainbow Stars"	Altberg	Altberg	4:30
8.	"Smells Like Blade" (from The Old Shit, 2006)	Altberg	Altberg	4:30
9.	"Stay Alive" (from The Old Shit, 2006)	Altberg	Altberg	4:02
10.	"Syndrome de Abstenencia" (from The Bassmachine, 2004)	Altberg	Altberg	6:35
11.	"The Bass Machine" (from The Bassmachine, 2004)	Altberg	Altberg	2:24
12.	"The Big Show" (from The Bassmachine, 2004)	Altberg	Altberg	5:38

CD2
No.	Title	Writer(s)	Producer(s)	Length
1.	"The Celtic Harmony & the Chilling Acid" (from The Old Shit, 2006)	Altberg	Altberg	4:36
2.	"The Night" (from The Old Shit, 2006)	Altberg	Altberg	5:03
3.	"The True Sound" (from The Bassmachine, 2004)	Altberg	Altberg	5:25
4.	"The Warp Zone" (from The Bassmachine, 2004)	Altberg	Altberg	5:17
5.	"Train Station" (from The Bassmachine, 2004)	Altberg	Altberg	5:49
6.	"Trance Up" (from "Syndrome de Abstenencia", 2004)	Altberg	Altberg	6:34
7.	"Transformation Bass" (from The Bassmachine, 2004)	Altberg	Altberg	5:04
8.	"Try to Stop Us"	Altberg	Altberg	4:07
9.	"Wacco Will Kick Your Ass" (from "Wacco Will Kick Your Ass", 2005)	Altberg	Altberg	6:04
10.	"Waiting for the Moon" (from The Old Shit, 2006)	Altberg	Altberg	4:58
11.	"Wizard Elements"	Altberg	Altberg	5:39
Total length:				1:52:56

== Release history ==
Date	Format	Label
3 December 2012	Digital download	Rush Hour
4 December 2012	Digital download	Extensive Music; Ultra Records
16 December 2012	Digital download	3Beat Productions
23 January 2013	2×CD	Ultra
