= Walk on Water (Basshunter song) =

Single by Basshunter

Single by Basshunter

from the album Now You're Gone – The Album
- Released: 5 April 2009
- Length: 2:55 (Radio Edit)
- Label: Hard2Beat Records; Warner Music Sweden
- Songwriter: Basshunter
- Producer: Basshunter

Basshunter singles chronology
"I Miss You" (2008)	"Walk on Water" (2009)	"Al final" (2009)

Music video
- "Walk on Water" on YouTube

"Walk on Water" is a song that was written, recorded and produced by Swedish musician Basshunter; it was released in 5 April 2009 and added to the Deluxe Edition of Now You're Gone – The Album. A music video for "Walk on Water" was released on 27 February 2009. The song peaked at number 76 on the UK singles chart.

== Description ==
Basshunter's previous single "I Miss You" was released on 14 December 2008. "Walk on Water" is 175 seconds long. Basshunter wrote and produced the song. "Walk on Water" was originally released in 2007 as promotional single titled "I Can Walk on Water I Can Fly". The re-recorded version titled "I Can Walk on Water" was released on 14 July 2008 on Now You're Gone – The Album. "I Can Walk on Water" was written by Basshunter, and was produced by Basshunter and Robert Uhlmann.

On 5 April 2009, Hard2Beat Records released the second re-recording of the song, which is titled "Walk on Water", as a five-track single that includes an extended mix and remixes by Ultra DJ's, Bass Slammers and 7th Heaven. "Walk on Water" was also included in the Deluxe Edition of Now You're Gone – The Album. Basshunter's next single was "Al final", a Spanish-language version of "Now You're Gone" with vocals from Dani Mata, which was released on 5 May the same year.

In 2021 Basshunter played "I Can Walk on Water" live during the Øresound Festival in Copenhangen.

== Music video ==
The music video for "Walk on Water" was uploaded to YouTube on 27 February 2009. Basshunter did not want Aylar Lie to appear in the music video this time. A fan edit of the music video was uploaded to YouTube on 3 March.

== Reception ==
Professional ratings
Review scores
Source	Rating
Digital Spy	2/5 stars

Antti Niemelä from Findance.com said "I Can Walk on Water" is catchy. The editor of the website Female First described Basshunter's vocals in "Walk on Water" as "poptastic". David Balls from Digital Spy said "Walk on Water" has the same eurodance sound as previous Basshunter singles, criticized the low originality of the song, which he found not very exciting. In 2015, Simon Sweetman from Stuff quoted the song as an example of Basshunter's egoism for his list of the top-10 most-egotistical musicians.

== Chart performance ==
On 11 April 2009, "Walk on Water" entered the UK singles chart at number 92. It rose to number 76 the following week, after which it left the chart.

== Track listing ==
Digital download (5 April 2009), streaming
No.	Title	Writer(s)	Producer(s)	Length
1.	"Walk on Water" (UK Radio Edit)	Jonas Altberg	Altberg	2:55
2.	"Walk on Water" (UK Extended Mix)	Altberg	Altberg	4:30
3.	"Walk on Water" (Ultra DJ's Remix)	Altberg	Altberg	5:20
4.	"Walk on Water" (Bass Slammers Remix)	Altberg	Altberg	5:51
5.	"Walk on Water" (7th Heaven Remix)	Altberg	Altberg	6:23
Total length:				24:59

Digital download (13 April 2009), streaming
No.	Title	Writer(s)	Producer(s)	Length
1.	"Walk on Water" (UK Radio Edit)	Altberg	Altberg	2:55
2.	"I Can Walk on Water"	Altberg	Altberg	3:44
Total length:				6:39

== Charts ==
Weekly chart performance for "Walk on Water"
Chart (2009)	Peak position
UK Singles (OCC)	76

== Release history ==
Country	Date	Format	Label
United Kingdom	5 April 2009	Digital download	Hard2Beat Records
Sweden	13 April 2009	Digital download	Warner Music Sweden
