= Fonzerelli =

- Also known as: Yer Man, Touch & Go, Startraxx, Brazen, Skelpt, Dr Dapper, The Tone Ranger, Digital Glitter
- Born: Aaron McClelland
- Origin: Northern Ireland, United Kingdom
- Genres: House, funky house, progressive house, progressive trance, alternative dance, nu-disco
- Occupations: Disc jockey, record producer
- Years active: 2000–present
- Labels: Mena Music, Big in Ibiza
- Website: facebook.com/djfonzerelli,menamusic.com, soundcloud.com/menamusic

Aaron McClelland, known as Fonzerelli, is a British DJ and record producer.

== Biography ==
His 2006 single, "Moonlight Party", charted in the Netherlands, Finland and Australia. Fonzerelli's remix of J. Majik & Wickaman's "Crazy World" is featured on the Grand Theft Auto IV soundtrack on Vladivostok FM.

Fonzerelli has also remixed for various UK artists and labels; most notably "Now You're Gone" and "All I Ever Wanted", featured on Basshunter's Platinum selling Now You're Gone – The Album. He also had his own productions and remixes played on Saturday nights on BBC Radio 1 than any other artist in 2006 and 2007, as DJ Judge Jules was a massive supporter of Fonzerelli's work on his Saturday warmup show.

His single "Dreamin' (Of A Hot Summers Night)" hit number 2 in the DMC Buzz Chart and number 6 in the Cool Cuts Chart.

Many of the world's major and influential labels have commissioned Fonzerelli remixes for acts such as Fedde Le Grand, J. Majik & Wickerman, Chanel, Sash!, Mauro Picotto, Beatfreakz and Tiësto featuring Maxi Jazz and Basshunter as well as original material for his own Mena Music label and Big in Ibiza.

Fonzerelli's debut single "Moonlight Party" was championed by Tiësto and soon became the number 1 selling download of 2006 on download store DJ Download.

== Discography ==
=== Charting singles ===
List of singles, with selected chart positions
Title	Year	Peak chart positions			
Title	Year	UK	AUS	FIN	NLD
"Moonlight Party"	2006	–	44	8	37
"Infinity"	2008	96	–	–	–
"Dreamin' (of a Hot Summers Night)"	2009	– (Note: "Dreamin' (of a Hot Summers Night)" did not crack the main UK singles chart, but landed at number 14 on the Official Independent Singles Breakers chart.)	–	–	–
