= Baby Alice =

Swedish Eurodance band

- Origin: Sweden
- Genres: Eurodance, Electronic
- Years active: 2005–Present
- Labels: Warner Music Sweden (2005–2008); Catchy Tunes. BROMA16, Black Lemon, Ultra Records
- Members: Andreas Svensson (2005–); Tim Åström (2005–); My Hoglund (2016-)
- Past members: Sandra Gundstedt (2005–2010); Hanna Adolfsson (2005–2009, 2016); Natalie Granath (2010–2015)
- Website: http://www.babyalice.se

Baby Alice is a Swedish Eurodance band formed in 2005, best known for their song "Piña Colada Boy." The band currently consists of Andreas Svensson, Tim Åström, and My Hoglund.

== History ==
From 2005 to 2009, Hanna Adolfsson was the lead singer in the songs while the stage singer was Sandra Gundstedt. They recorded "Pina Colada Boy" in 2008 and released it in 2010 under Ultra Records. Natalie Granath took over both vocals and stage performance in 2010.

In 2016, Hanna Adolfsson returned to Baby Alice and they released "Naked". Hanna left the group that year and My Höglund later joined as the lead vocalist. They released "WOFF", and later "Ice Cream" as singles in 2020. My Hoglund debuted as the lead singer of these songs, and "WOFF" received 2 million streams when released.

== Discography ==
Singles

- "Shake It" (2006)
- "Mr. DJ" (2007)
- "Pina Colada Boy" (2008)
- "Hurricane" (2009)
- "Heaven Is a Dancefloor" (2011)
- "Old school" (2015)
- "S.E.X. Y" (2015)
- "One World" (2015)
- "Naked" (2016)
- "ICE CREAM" (2020)
- "WOFF" (2020)
- "RAVER" (2023)
