= The Bassmachine =

Studio album by Basshunter
- Released: 25 August 2004
- Length: 51:00
- Label: Alex Music
- Producer: Basshunter

Basshunter chronology
The Bassmachine (2004)	LOL <(^^,)> (2006)

Singles from The Bassmachine
- 1. "The Big Show" Released: 27 October 2004

The Bassmachine is the debut studio album by Swedish musician Basshunter. It was released on 25 August 2004 by Alex Music. In 2005 a remastered version of this album was released, with better sound quality and volume. In 2006 album was released on Basshunter webpage as The Bass Machine. All tracks listed on the album were re-released on The Early Bedroom Sessions in 2012.

== Background and release ==
The release date was originally scheduled for July 2004. Before the release on 25 August by Alex Music album was available to pre-order. Sample of album from Alex Music contained unreleased track. Basshunter wrote and produced all tracks. On 21 September the promo single "Syndrome de Abstenencia" was released by Alex Music and the only single from album, "The Big Show" was self-released by Basshunter on 27 October. In 2005 a remastered version of this album was released, with better sound quality and volume.

The album contains ten tracks which last 51 minutes. "The Bassmachine" is the opening track and "Fest folk" is the closing track. The longest track on the album is "Syndrome de Abstenencia", which runs for six minutes and 34 seconds. Opening track is also the shortest track, lasting two minutes and 22 seconds. David Jeffries from AllMusic described The Bassmachine and The Old Shit as mostly instrumental albums with the pounding and the fury of pre-electronic dance music style of stadium techno which was called jumpstyle.

In 2005 "Syndrome de Abstenencia" (Original Mix) was released on compilation album Hard Trance Club Collection Vol. 1. In 2006 on the occasion of the release of the LOL <(^^,)> album, The Bassmachine album was released on Basshunter webpage as The Bass Machine. LOL <(^^,)> included 2006 remix of "Fest folk". English version of the song was released on the next version of album as "We Are the Waccos". All tracks from The Bassmachine and seven tracks from The Old Shit was re-released as part of The Early Bedroom Sessions album in 2012.

== Track listing ==
The Bassmachine
No.	Title	Writer(s)	Producer(s)	Length
1.	"The Bassmachine"	Jonas Altberg	Jonas Altberg	2:22
2.	"The Big Show"	Altberg	Altberg	5:36
3.	"The True Sound"	Altberg	Altberg	5:25
4.	"Train Station"	Altberg	Altberg	5:45
5.	"Contact by Bass"	Altberg	Altberg	3:53
6.	"Syndrome de Abstenencia"	Altberg	Altberg	6:34
7.	"The Warpzone"	Altberg	Altberg	5:34
8.	"Bass Worker"	Altberg	Altberg	6:14
9.	"Transformation Bass"	Altberg	Altberg	5:03
10.	"Fest folk"	Altberg	Altberg	4:34
Total length:				51:00

== Release history ==
Date	Format	Version	Label
25 August 2004	CD	Original	Alex Music
2005	CD	Remastered	Alex Music
Second half of 2005	Digital download	Remastered	Self-released
Second half of 2006	Digital download	Original	Self-released
