= Now You're Gone – The Album =

Studio album by Basshunter
- Released: 14 July 2008
- Genre: Eurodance
- Length: 58:49
- Labels: Hard2Beat; Warner Music Sweden; Ultra
- Producer: Basshunter

Basshunter chronology
The Old Shit (2006)	Now You're Gone – The Album (2008)	Bass Generation (2009)

Singles from Now You're Gone – The Album
- 1. "Now You're Gone" Released: 31 December 2007; 2. "Please Don't Go" Released: 19 May 2008; 3. "All I Ever Wanted" Released: 29 June 2008; 4. "Angel in the Night" Released: 6 October 2008 (UK); 5. "I Miss You" Released: 15 December 2008

Singles from Now You're Gone – The Album (Deluxe Edition)
- 1. "Walk on Water" Released: 5 April 2009

Now You're Gone – The Album is the third studio album by Swedish musician Basshunter. Released on 14 July 2008, it is his debut English language album, entering the UK Albums Chart at number one, and selling in excess of 329,717 copies in the United Kingdom making it platinum.

In New Zealand, the album peaked at number one in its fifth week, and was certified double platinum selling over 30,000 copies. The album spent a total of two weeks at number one.

== Reception ==
Professional ratings
Review scores
Source	Rating
AllMusic	3/5 stars
Digital Spy	1/5 stars
Dome.fi	2/5 stars
entertainment.ie	1/5 stars
Findance.com	4/10 stars
The Guardian	1/5 stars
musicserver.cz	1/10 stars
QX	3/5 stars

Ronny Larsson from QX noted that the English-language lyrics no longer refer to the data as they did on the LOL album, but still sings on about nonsense, adding that dance music lyrics are not too poetic. Leo Gold for EDM Sauce described “In Her Eyes” as one of the best Basshunter songs, noting that it stands out on the album and praising the vocal sample "Are you ready to party?!".

== Chart performance ==
On 20 July 2008, Now You're Gone – The Album debuted at number one on the UK Albums Chart with sale of 36,825 copies.

== Track listing ==
Now You're Gone – The Album track listing
No.	Title	Writer(s)	Producer(s)	Length
1.	"Now You're Gone" (feat. DJ Mental Theo's Bazzheadz)	Jonas Altberg; Theo Nabuurs	Altberg; Robert Uhlmann	2:40
2.	"All I Ever Wanted"	David Le Roy; Jean Christophe Belval; Scott Simons	Altberg; Uhlmann; Simons	2:58
3.	"Please Don't Go"	Harry Wayne Casey; Richard Finch	Altberg; Uhlmann; Simons	2:50
4.	"I Miss You"	Rami Yaacoub; Jake Schulze	Altberg; Simons; Uhlmann	3:47
5.	"Angel in the Night"	Altberg	Altberg; Uhlmann; Simons	3:23
6.	"In Her Eyes"	Altberg; Simons	Altberg; Simons; Uhlmann	3:14
7.	"Love You More"	Lucia Holm; Paul Carnell	Altberg; Simons; Uhlmann	3:52
8.	"Camilla"	Francis Hill; Altberg	Altberg; Uhlmann; Simons	3:16
9.	"Dream Girl"	Simons	Altberg; Simons; Uhlmann	4:28
10.	"I Can Walk on Water"	Altberg	Altberg; Uhlmann	3:46
11.	"Bass Creator"	Altberg; Hill	Altberg; Uhlmann; Simons	5:02
12.	"Russia Privjet"	Altberg	Altberg; Uhlmann	4:05

Now You're Gone – The Album – bonus tracks
No.	Title	Writer(s)	Length
13.	"Boten Anna"	Altberg	3:29
14.	"DotA"	Le Roy; Belval; Simons	3:22
15.	"Now You're Gone" (Fonzerelli Edit)	Altberg; Nabuurs	3:15
16.	"All I Ever Wanted" (Fonzerelli Edit)	Le Roy; Belval; Simons	2:34
Total length:			58:49

Now You're Gone – The Album – UK iTunes bonus tracks
No.	Title	Writer(s)	Length
1.	"Now You're Gone" (featuring DJ Mental Theo's Bazzheadz) (Video Edit)	Altberg	2:40
17.	"Welcome to Rainbow"	Altberg	5:09
18.	"Hardstyle Drops"	Altberg	5:31

Now You're Gone – The Album – UK iTunes deluxe edition bonus tracks
No.	Title	Writer(s)	Length
1.	"Now You're Gone" (featuring DJ Mental Theo's Bazzheadz) (Video Edit)	Altberg	2:40
4.	"I Miss You" (Radio Edit)	Altberg	2:45
5.	"Angel in the Night" (Radio Edit)	Altberg	2:56
10.	"Walk on Water" (UK Radio Edit)	Altberg	2:55
15.	"Now You're Gone" (featuring DJ Mental Theo's Bazzheadz) (Sound Selektaz Remix)	Altberg	5:35
16.	"All I Ever Wanted" (Ultra DJ's Remix)	Altberg	5:34
17.	"Angel in the Night" (Headhunters Remix)	Altberg	5:37
18.	"I Miss You" (Headhunters Remix)	Altberg	5:08
19.	"Walk on Water" (7th Heaven Remix)	Altberg	6:23
20.	"Please Don't Go" (Ultra DJ's Remix)	Altberg	4:39
21.	"Megamix" (music video)		4:45
22.	"Walk on Water" (music video)		3:02

Now You're Gone – The Album – Sweden iTunes bonus tracks
No.	Title	Writer(s)	Length
17.	"Welcome to Rainbow"	Altberg	5:09
18.	"Hardstyle Drops"	Altberg	5:31
19.	"Boten Anna" (DJ Micro Spankin Club Mix)	Altberg	5:30
20.	"Boten Anna" (Nightshifters Remix - Radio Edit)	Altberg	3:09
21.	"DotA" (PJ Harmony Saturday Remix)	Le Roy; Belval; Simons	5:09

== Charts ==
=== Weekly charts ===
2008 weekly chart performance for Now You're Gone – The Album
Chart (2008)	Peak position
Austria (Ö3 Austria)	17
Belgium (Ultratop Wallonia)	31
European Albums (Billboard)	6
Finland (Musiikkituottajat)	35
France (SNEP)	36
Ireland (IRMA)	2
Poland (ZPAV)	43
Sweden (Sverigetopplistan)	38
Switzerland (Swiss Hitparade)	32
United Kingdom (OCC)	1
UK Dance Albums (Official Charts)	1
US Top Heatseekers Albums (Billboard)	45
US Dance/Electronic Albums (Billboard)	14

2009 weekly chart performance for Now You're Gone – The Album
Chart (2009)	Peak position
New Zealand (RMNZ)	1

2010 weekly chart performance for Now You're Gone – The Album
Chart (2010)	Peak position
UK Independent Albums (Official Charts)	12

=== Year-end charts ===
Yearly chart performance for Now You're Gone – The Album
Chart (2008)	Position
United Kingdom (OCC)	45
Chart (2009)	Position
New Zealand (RMNZ)	14

== Certifications ==
Certifications and sales for Now You're Gone – The Album
Region	Certification	Certified units/sales
Denmark (IFPI Danmark)	Platinum	20,000^{‡}
New Zealand (RMNZ)	2× Platinum	30,000^{‡}
United Kingdom (BPI)	Platinum	376,017
Summaries
Europe	—	350,000
^{‡} Sales+streaming figures based on certification alone.

== Release history ==
Release dates for Now You're Gone – The Album
Region	Date
United Kingdom	14 July 2008
Europe	22 August 2008
United States	23 September 2008
Brazil	6 October 2008

== See also ==
- List of UK Albums Chart number ones of the 2000s
- List of UK Dance Albums Chart number ones of 2008
- List of number-one albums from the 2000s (New Zealand)
- New Zealand top 50 albums of 2009
