= Dance Nation (record label) =

British record label

- Parent company: Ministry of Sound, Clubland
- Founded: 2007 (as Hard2Beat)
- Genre: Electronic dance music
- Country of origin: United Kingdom and Ireland
- Location: London
- Official website: Dance Nation.com

Dance Nation was a British independent record label which was a subsidiary of Ministry of Sound. When founded in 2007 it was known as Hard2Beat Records, and was rebranded to its current name in 2010.

The label's first release was "Now You're Gone" by Basshunter, and they have released other singles and compilation albums since then.

In April 2009 they held Dance Nation Live, a live arena tour across the UK. Basshunter headlined the tour with acts including Sash!, Lasgo, and Platnum.

Dance Nation had its own customized content channel on Audiotube. The label brand was used as a Sky TV Channel in 2012, since it has not had any new releases or live tours. The official website went offline in April 2015 as well as all social media sites.

== Artists ==
2007

- Basshunter

2008

- September
- Sash!
- Headhunterz

2009

- Ultra DJ's
- Bad Behaviour
- Wildstylez

2010

- Flip & Fill
- Kindervater
- Forenzelli

== Discography ==
=== Studio albums ===
Catalog	Release date	Artist	Title	Peak chart positions		Certifications
Catalog	Release date	Artist	Title	UK	IRL	Certifications
H2BCD04	2008-07-14	Basshunter	Now You're Gone – The Album	1	2	BPI: Platinum
H2BCD14	2009-10-05	Basshunter	Bass Generation	16	16	BPI: Gold

=== Compilations ===
Release date	Artist	Title	Certifications
2008-01-14	Various artists	Big Tunes 2008	BPI: Gold
2008-04-21	Various artists	Club Anthems 2008	
2008-07-21	Various artists	Put Your Hands Up! 4	
2008-09-29	Various artists	Classic Big Tunes – Living for the Weekend	BPI: Gold
2008-10-20	Sash!	The Best Of	BPI: Platinum
2008-12-01	Various artists	Hard House Anthems	
2008-12-29	Various artists	Wigan Pier Presents Bounce	BPI: Silver
2009-05-04	Various artists	Dance Nation – Your Big Night Out	
2009-06-08	Various artists	Big Tunes: Ignition	BPI: Silver
2009-07-27	Various artists	Big Tunes – Back 2 the 90's	BPI: Platinum
2009-08-03	September	Cry for You – The Album	
2009-09-07	Various artists	Wigan Pier Presents Bounce 2	
2009-11-20	Various artists	Dance Nation 2 – Your Big Night Out	BPI: Gold
2010-07-26	Various artists	Big Tunes – Back 2 the 90's 2	BPI: Silver
2010-09-20	Various artists	Dance Nation 2010 – Your Big Night Out	
2010-10-25	Various artists	Big Tunes Xtreme	

=== Singles ===
Catalog	Release date	Artist	Title	Peak chart positions		Certifications
Catalog	Release date	Artist	Title	UK	IRL	Certifications
H2B01	2007-12-31	Basshunter	"Now You're Gone"	1	1	BPI: 2× Platinum
H2B02	2008-02-18	H "Two" O feat. Platnum	"What's It Gonna Be"	2	7	BPI: Platinum
H2B03	2008-04-14	September	"Cry for You"	5	8	BPI: Gold
H2B06	2008-07-07	Sunset Strippers	"Step Right Up"	—	—	
H2B07	2008-08-11	7th Heaven feat. Katherine Ellis	"Ain't Nothin' Goin' on But the Rent"	—	—	
H2B08	2008-06-30	Basshunter	"All I Ever Wanted"	2	1	BPI: Platinum
H2B10	2008-07-28	Bob Sinclar presents Fireball	"What I Want"	52	—	
H2B11	2008-07-28	Weekend Warriors	"Don't Stop Believing"	—	—	
H2B12	2008-10-06	Platnum	"Love Shy (Thinking About You)"	12	24	BPI: Silver
H2B15	2008-10-13	Sash! feat. Stunt	"Raindrops (Encore une fois)"	9	28	BPI: Gold
H2B16	2008-09-29	Basshunter	"Angel in the Night"	14	10	BPI: Silver
H2B17	2008-09-29	Bass Slammers feat. Sally Jaxx	"Dancing with an Angel"	—	—	
H2B18	2009-05-18	Star Pilots	"In the Heat of the Night"	21	—	
H2B19	2008-10-27	Groove Coverage	"Moonlight Shadow"	100	—	
H2B20	2008-12-15	Basshunter	"I Miss You"	32	—	
H2B21	2008-12-08	Geo Da Silva	"I'll Do You like a Truck"	—	—	
H2B22	2009-04-06	Lasgo	"Out of My Mind"	—	—	
H2B23	2009-03-09	September	"Can't Get Over"	14	38	
H2B24	2008-12-15	Confused Crew	"One Bad Apple"	—	—	
H2B25	2008-12-15	Basshunter	"Jingle Bells (Bass)"	35	—	
H2B26	2009-04-06	Basshunter	"Walk on Water"	76	—	
H2B27	2009	Gathania	"Blame It on You"	—	—	
H2B28	2009	Fragma	"Memory"	—	—	
H2B29	2009-03-16	Lenny Fontana & Ridney present Larisa	"Wait 4 U"	—	—	
H2B30	2009	Big Ange vs. Becky Rhodes	"Angry"	—	—	
H2B31	2009	Lazee feat. Neverstore	"Hold on"	46	—	
H2B32	2009	Platnum	"Trippin'"	—	—	
H2B33	2009	Bandito	"Rockin' At the Disco"	—	—	
H2B35	2009-04-20	AnnaGrace	"You Make Me Feel"	—	—	
H2B40	2009	September	"Until I Die"	—	—	
H2B42	2009-09-21	Basshunter	"Every Morning"	17	—	
H2B45	2009-10-30	Basshunter	"I Promised Myself"	94	—	
H2B46	2009	Fugative	"Supafly"	48	—	
H2B48	2009	Fugative	"Crush"	26	—	
H2B49	2009	Fugative	"Bad Girl"	59	—	
H2B50	2009-04-02	Boom	"How Do You Do"	—	—	
DANCEN09	2010-07-18	Basshunter	"Saturday"	21	37	
"—" denotes a recording that did not chart or was not released in that territory.
