= Angel in the Night =

2008 single by Basshunter

Single by Basshunter

from the album Now You're Gone – The Album
- Released: 15 September 2008
- Recorded: 2008
- Genre: Eurodance
- Length: 2:57 (Radio Edit); 3:28 (album version)
- Label: Hard2Beat; Warner Music Sweden
- Songwriter: Basshunter
- Producers: Basshunter; Robert Uhlmann; Scott Simons

Basshunter singles chronology
| "All I Ever Wanted" (2008) | "Angel in the Night" (2008) | "Russia Privjet (Hardlanger Remix)" (2008) |

Music video
- "Angel in the Night" on YouTube

"Angel in the Night" is a song by Swedish musician Basshunter from his published work Now You're Gone – The Album. The single was released on 15 September 2008, and was written and produced by Basshunter, Robert Uhlmann, and Scott Simons. "Angel in the Night" has an instrumentation consisting of guitar.

A music video for "Angel in the Night" was released on 29 August 2008. It was directed by Alex Herron and filmed in Oslo. The clip continues the story with Aylar Lie. The single peaked at number 10 on Irish singles chart and number 14 on UK Singles Chart. In 2022 it was certified Silver for sales of 200,000 copies.

== Description ==
"Angel in the Night" is two minutes and 57 seconds long, which is over 20 seconds shorter than album version. The song was written by Basshunter, and produced by Basshunter, Robert Uhlmann and Scott Simons. Basshunter said that he wanted to develop artistically and the song was the first step toward much rockier songs. He want to make songs with guitars and drum solos within a trancey beat.

== Release ==
Basshunter's previous single, "All I Ever Wanted", was released on 29 June 2008. "Angel in the Night" was premiered on 14 July on his Now You're Gone – The Album. The song was added to Friday Floor Fillers which is part of Scott Mills radio show on BBC Radio 1 on 22 August 2008. On 17 September 2008, the song was upgraded to BBC Radio 1's A-List. The single "Angel in the Night" was released on 15 September 2008. Maxi single contains remixes from Ali Payami, Headhunters and Soulseekerz. "Russia Privjet (Hardlanger Remix)" is the next single and was released on 13 October 2008.

== Music video ==
The music video for "Angel in the Night" was shot in Oslo and was directed by Alex Herron. The video follows on from the previous music video, "All I Ever Wanted". Left by ex-boyfriend Lucas, Aylar Lie is comforted by her new boyfriend Basshunter, who invites her to a street race. Marielle Mathiassen who previously appeared in music video for "Now You're Gone" play Lie's friend. The story continued in the next music video, "I Miss You".

== Reception ==
Professional ratings
Review scores
| Source | Rating |
|---|---|
| Digital Spy | 2/5 stars |
| Skiddle | 2/5 stars |

Nick Levine from Digital Spy said that "Angel in the Night" is different than previous Basshunter singles and he drew attention to the existence of guitar riff. Levine said that eurodance beats are throbbing and deadpan vocals over the top are tuneless. He also described keyboard sounds negatively. Richard Dyer from Skiddle described "Angel in the Night" as eurotrash soundtrack without sense. He added that this song is not for him but plenty of people will love it. Alex Fletcher from Digital Spy said that "Angel in the Night" has a more rock feel to the songs on the Now You're Gone – The Album. Antti Niemelä from Findance.com said that the song uses a completely inappropriate electric guitar.

== Chart performance ==
"Angel in the Night" entered the UK Singles Chart at number 54 on 13 September 2008 and peaked in its fifth week on chart at number 14. In its second last week on chart in 2009 it sold 4,592 copies. In 2022 it was certified Silver for sales of 200,000 copies. "Angel in the Night" debuted on Irish singles chart on 11 September and peaked at number 10 for two weeks. On 16 October it debuted on Swedish singles chart at number 50 where it spent one week.

== Track listing ==
CD maxi single (29 September 2008)
| No. | Title | Writer(s) | Producer(s) | Length |
|---|---|---|---|---|
| 1. | "Angel in the Night (Radio Edit)" | Jonas Altberg | Altberg; Robert Uhlmann; Scott Simons | 2:57 |
| 2. | "Angel in the Night (Soulseekerz Radio Edit)" | Altberg | Altberg; Uhlmann; Simons | 2:44 |
| 3. | "Angel in the Night (Extended Mix)" | Altberg | Altberg; Uhlmann; Simons | 5:18 |
| 4. | "Angel in the Night (Soulseekerz Extended Mix)" | Altberg | Altberg; Uhlmann; Simons | 7:47 |
| 5. | "Angel in the Night (Ali Payami Remix)" | Altberg | Altberg; Uhlmann; Simons | 6:37 |
| 6. | "Angel in the Night (Headhunters Remix)" | Altberg | Altberg; Uhlmann; Simons | 5:38 |
| Total length: | | | | 36:42 |

CD single (2008), digital download (15 September 2008), streaming
| No. | Title | Writer(s) | Producer(s) | Length |
|---|---|---|---|---|
| 1. | "Angel in the Night (Radio Edit)" | Altberg | Altberg; Uhlmann; Simons (Note: Robert Uhlmann and Scott Simons are not credited as producers in Spotify version of release.) | 2:53 |
| 2. | "Angel in the Night (Soulseekerz Radio Edit)" | Altberg | Altberg; Uhlmann; Simons | 2:44 |
| Total length: | | | | 5:37 |

Digital download (22 September 2008)
| No. | Title | Length |
|---|---|---|
| 1. | "Angel in the Night (Radio Edit)" | 2:56 |
| 2. | "Angel In the Night (Ali Payami Dub)" | 6:35 |
| Total length: | | 9:31 |

12-inch single (2008)
| No. | Title | Writer(s) | Producer(s) | Length |
|---|---|---|---|---|
| 1. | "Angel in the Night (Headhunters Remix)" | Altberg | Altberg; Uhlmann; Simons | 5:38 |
| 2. | "Angel in the Night (Extended Remix)" | Altberg | Altberg; Uhlmann; Simons | 5:18 |
| 3. | "Angel in the Night (Soulseekerz Extended Mix)" | Altberg | Altberg; Uhlmann; Simons | 7:46 |
| 4. | "Angel in the Night (Ali Payami Remix)" | Altberg | Altberg; Uhlmann; Simons | 6:37 |
| Total length: | | | | 25:19 |

Digital download (28 November 2008), streaming
| No. | Title | Writer(s) | Producer(s) | Length |
|---|---|---|---|---|
| 1. | "Angel in the Night (Radio Edit)" | Altberg | Altberg (Note: Robert Uhlmann and Scott Simons are credited as producers in Qobuz version of release.) | 2:53 |
| 2. | "Go Down Now" | Altberg | Altberg | 4:54 |
| Total length: | | | | 7:47 |

== Personnel ==
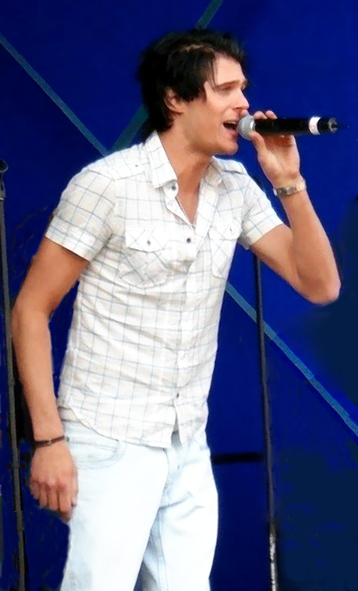
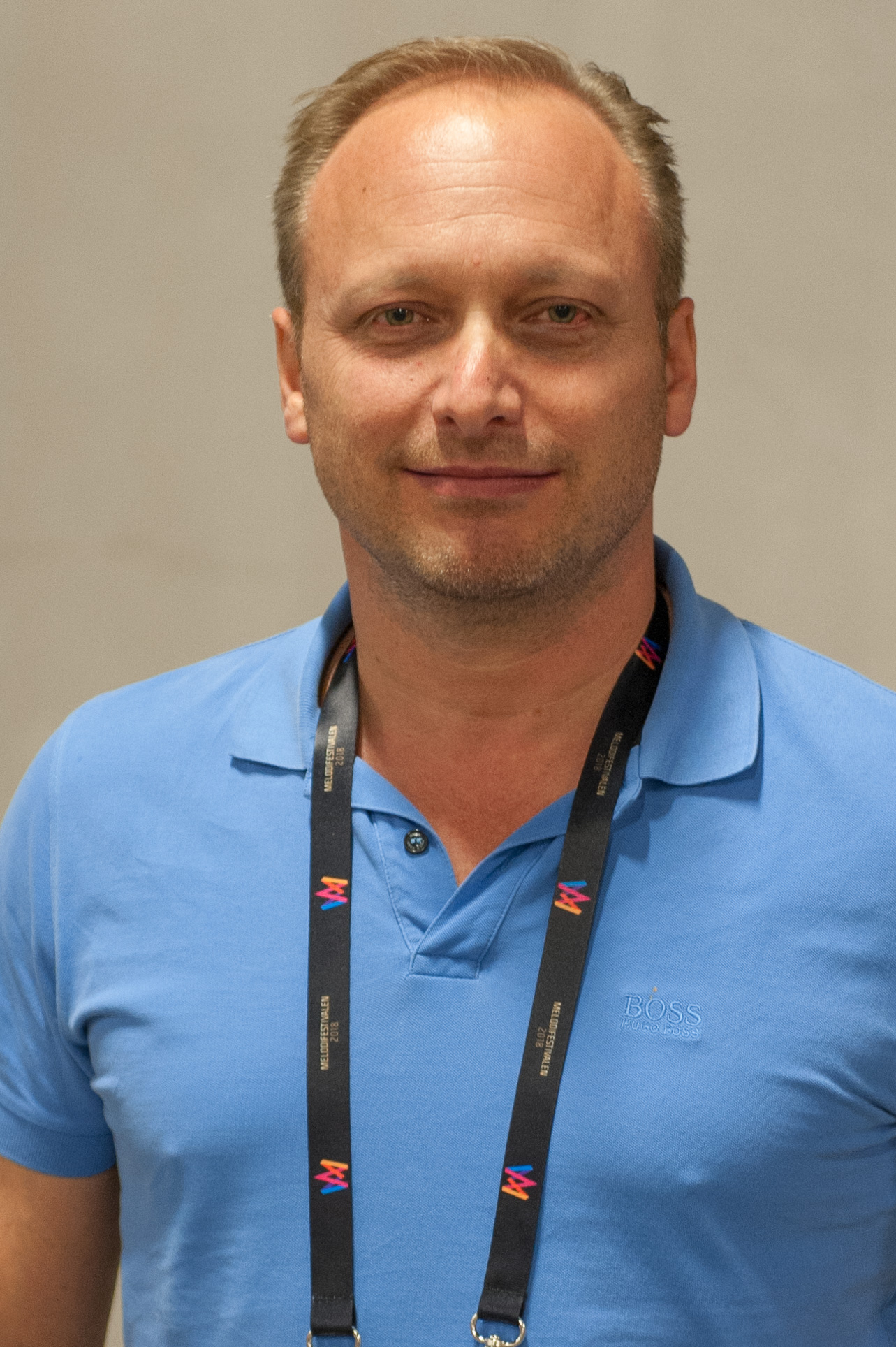
Swedish musician Basshunter (left) and Swedish music producer Robert Uhlmann produced "Angel in the Night" with Scott Simons.

Credits

- Writer – Basshunter
- Producer – Basshunter, Robert Uhlmann, Scott Simons

== Charts ==
Weekly chart performance for "Angel in the Night"
| Chart (2008) | Peak position |
|---|---|
| European Hot 100 Singles (Billboard) | 43 |
| Ireland (IRMA) | 10 |
| Slovakia (Radio Top100 Oficiálna) | 43 |
| Sweden (Sverigetopplistan) | 50 |
| UK Singles (Official Charts) | 14 |
| UK Dance (Official Charts) | 7 |

=== Year-end charts ===
| Chart (2008) | Position |
|---|---|
| UK Singles (OCC) | 114 |

== Certifications ==
Certifications and sales for "Angel in the Night"
| Region | Certification | Certified units/sales |
|---|---|---|
| United Kingdom (BPI) | Silver | 200,000^{‡} |
^{‡} Sales+streaming figures based on certification alone.
