= Every Morning (Basshunter song) =

Single by Basshunter

from the album Bass Generation
- Released: 21 September 2009
- Recorded: 2009
- Genre: Eurodance
- Length: 3:30 (radio edit)
- Label: Hard2Beat
- Songwriters: Basshunter; Scott Simons
- Producer: Basshunter

Basshunter singles chronology
"Al final" (2009)	"Every Morning" (2009)	"I Promised Myself" (2009)

Music video
- "Every Morning" on YouTube

"Every Morning" is a song by Swedish musician Basshunter from his fourth album, Bass Generation. The single was released on 21 September 2009.

== Reception ==
Professional ratings
Review scores
Source	Rating
BBC	3/5 stars
Digital Spy	2/5 stars
Mix 1	7/8 stars

Alex Miller from The Guardian said that "Every Morning" reminds McFly and criticized rhythms and lyrics. Miller also criticized the ending of music video. Alex Fletcher from Digital Spy said that despite the soft guitar jangle audible and some characteristics of the melody, it could be argued that "Every Morning" was a poor improvement over Now You're Gone – The Album. In conclusion he stated that because of the music video, lyrics and beats of the song "Every Morning" is an evolution rather than a revolution in Basshunter's development. Fletcher also noted that "Every Morning" is a little different from Basshunter usual style.

== Music video ==
The video for "Every Morning" was filmed in Mallorca, and features Aylar Lie.

== Chart performance ==
"Every Morning" entered the UK Singles Chart at number 17 on 3 October 2009 and sold 12,876 copies in its first week on chart. "Every Morning" also reached number 17 on Irish singles chart on 1 October. On 11 September it debuted on Swedish singles chart at number 18 and peaked in its second week on chart at number 13. On New Zealand singles chart it debuted on 14 September 2009 at number 39 and returned two weeks later reaching peak on number 14 after its three weeks on chart.

== Track listing ==
- CD maxi single (Jonas sleeve, 2009)
1. "Every Morning" (Radio Edit) – 3:15
2. "Every Morning" (Payami Remix) – 6:04
3. "Every Morning" (Extended Version) – 4:29
4. "Every Morning" (Michael Mind Remix) – 5:10
5. "Every Morning" (Headhunters Extended Version) – 5:23
6. "Every Morning" (Ultra DJ's Bass Mix) – 5:26
7. "Every Morning" (Rain Dropz Remix) – 4:52
8. "Every Morning" (Hot Pink Delorean Remix) – 7:02
- CD maxi single (Aylar sleeve, 21 September 2009)
1. "Every Morning" (Radio Edit) – 3:18
2. "Every Morning" (Extended Mix) – 4:30
3. "Every Morning" (Raindrops! Remix) – 4:54
4. "Every Morning" (Ultra DJs Bass Remix) – 4:28
5. "Every Morning" (Michael Mind Remix) – 5:12
6. "Every Morning" (Payami Remix) – 6:04

== Charts ==
2009 weekly chart performance for "Every Morning"
Chart (2009)	Peak position
CIS Airplay (TopHit)	61
Europe (European Hot 100 Singles)	49
Germany (GfK)	76
Ireland (IRMA)	17
New Zealand (Recorded Music NZ)	14
Sweden (Sverigetopplistan)	13
UK Singles (Official Charts)	17
UK Indie (Official Charts)	4
US Hot Dance Airplay (Billboard)	3

2010 weekly chart performance for "Every Morning"
Chart (2010)	Peak position
US Dance/Electronic Digital Song Sales (Billboard)	42
UK Dance (Official Charts)	37

== Certifications ==
Certifications and sales for "Every Morning"
Region	Certification	Certified units/sales
United Kingdom	—	12,876

== Awards ==
Awards for "Every Morning"
Award	Year	Category	Result	Ref.
International Dance Music Award	2010	Best HiNRG/Euro Track	Nominated	
