= All I Ever Wanted (Basshunter song) =

2008 single by Basshunter

- Standard variant

Single by Basshunter

from the album Now You're Gone – The Album
- Released: 29 June 2008
- Recorded: 2008
- Genre: Eurodance; EDM
- Length: 2:58
- Label: Hard2Beat
- Songwriters: David Le Roy; Jean Christophe Belval; Scott Simons
- Producers: Basshunter; Robert Uhlmann; Scott Simons

Basshunter singles chronology
"Please Don't Go" (2008)	"All I Ever Wanted" (2008)	"Angel in the Night" (2008)

Music video
- "All I Ever Wanted" on YouTube

Professional ratings
Review scores
Source	Rating
BBC	3/5 stars
Digital Spy	2/5 stars

"All I Ever Wanted" is a song by Swedish musician Basshunter. It is similar to his previous single "Now You're Gone" in that it is an English remake using music based on a previous Basshunter track, without any lyrical connection. The melody for "All I Ever Wanted" is largely a remixed version of "Daddy DJ", as is Basshunter's earlier song "Vi sitter i Ventrilo och spelar DotA".

"All I Ever Wanted" uses the melody from the song "Daddy DJ", created by the French dance act of the same name.

== Composition ==
"All I Ever Wanted" is a beat-driven, heavily vocodered track.

== Music video ==
The video clip features Aylar Lie and Lucas Thorheim.

== Chart performance ==
On 6 July 2008, the song entered the UK singles chart at number three and sold 26,044 copies in its first week on chart, then climbed to number two the following week. It had a long and successful chart run in the UK and a year and a half after its release it re-entered the UK top 100 at number 98 due to Basshunter being a contestant on Celebrity Big Brother 7 and it often being played on the spin-off shows Big Brother's Big Mouth and Big Brother's Little Brother.

In New Zealand, the song debuted at number 27 and peaked at number seventeen and was certified platinum.

== Track listing ==
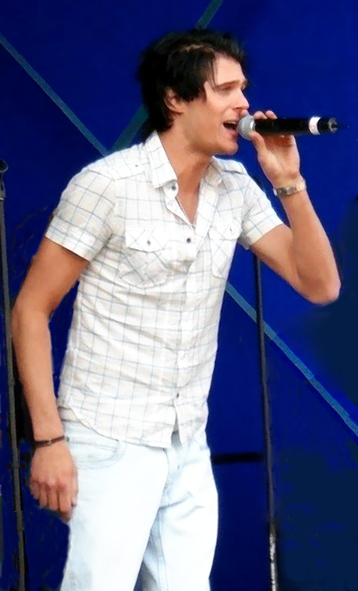
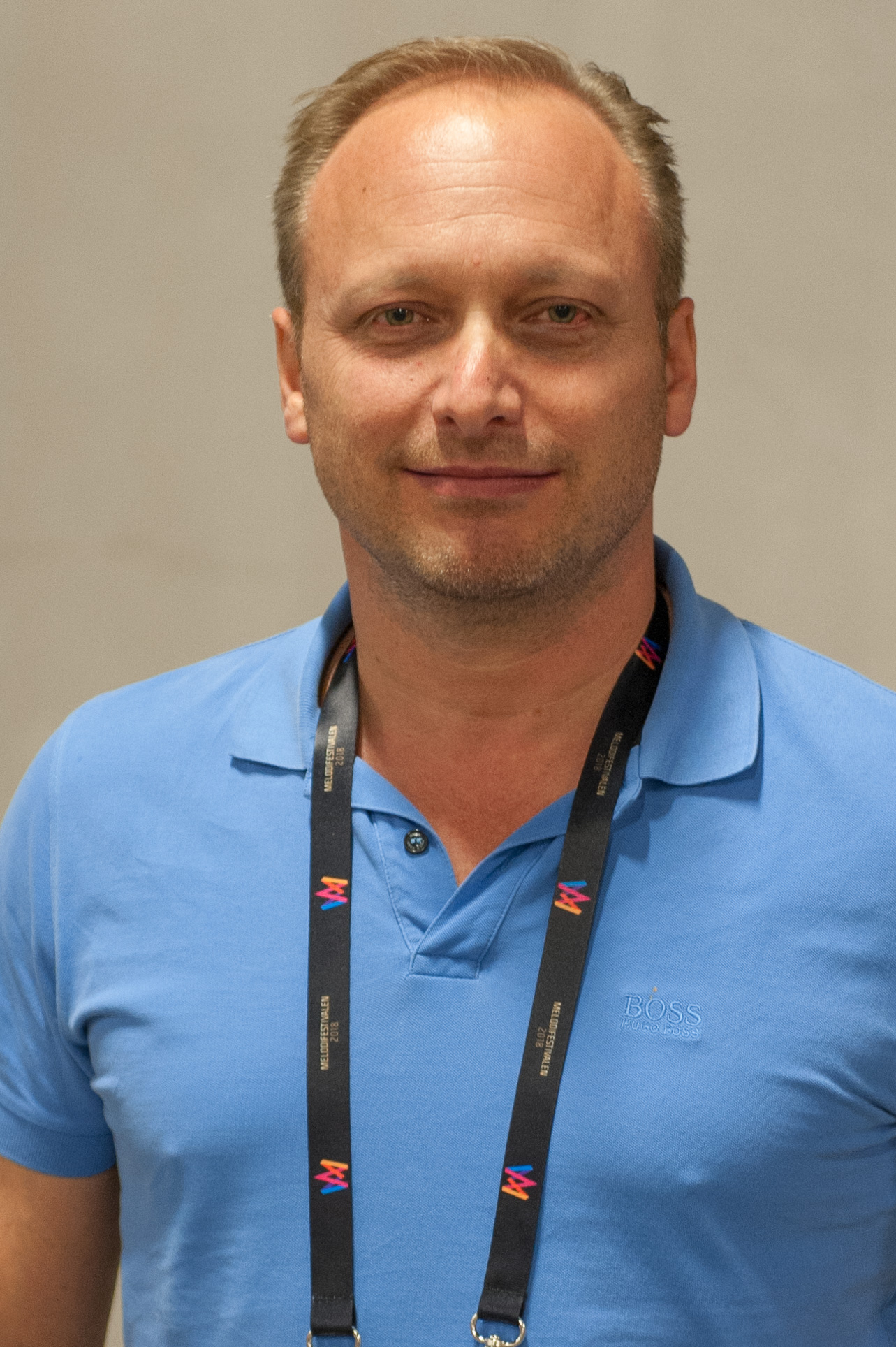
Swedish musician Basshunter (left) and Swedish music producer Robert Uhlmann produced "All I Ever Wanted" with Scott Simons.
- UK single
1. "All I Ever Wanted" (Radio Edit) – 2:59
2. "All I Ever Wanted" (Extended Mix) – 5:25
3. "All I Ever Wanted" (Fonzerelli Remix) – 6:39
4. "Now You're Gone" (Voodoo & Serano Remix) (featuring DJ Mental Theo's Bazzheadz) – 5:39

== Charts ==
=== Weekly charts ===
Weekly chart performance for "All I Ever Wanted"
Chart (2008–2010)	Peak position
Austria (Ö3 Austria Top 40)	15
Belgium (Ultratop 50 Wallonia)	36
CIS Airplay (TopHit)	54
Czech Republic (Radio Top 100)	48
Europe (European Hot 100 Singles)	10
Germany (GfK)	35
Hungary (Dance Top 40)	39
Ireland (IRMA)	1
Netherlands (Dutch Top 40 Tipparade)	15
New Zealand (Recorded Music NZ)	17
Norway (VG-lista)	3
Romania (Romanian Top 100)	10
Scottish Singles Sales (Official Charts)	1
Slovakia (Radio Top100 Oficiálna)	12
Sweden (Sverigetopplistan)	58
Switzerland (Schweizer Hitparade)	37
Turkey (Türkiye Top 20)	20
UK Singles (Official Charts)	2
UK Dance (Official Charts)	3
UK Indie (Official Charts)	9

=== Year-end charts ===
Yearly chart performance for "All I Ever Wanted"
Chart (2008)	Position
CIS (Tophit)	178
UK Singles (OCC)	50

== Certifications ==
Certifications and sales for "All I Ever Wanted"
Region	Certification	Certified units/sales
Denmark (IFPI Danmark)	Gold	45,000^{‡}
New Zealand (RMNZ)	Platinum	15,000^{*}
United Kingdom (BPI)	Platinum	600,000^{‡}
^{*} Sales figures based on certification alone.^{‡} Sales+streaming figures based on certification alone.

== See also ==
- List of number-one singles of 2008 (Ireland)
- List of UK top-ten singles in 2008
