= Robert Uhlmann =

Swedish media executive and composer

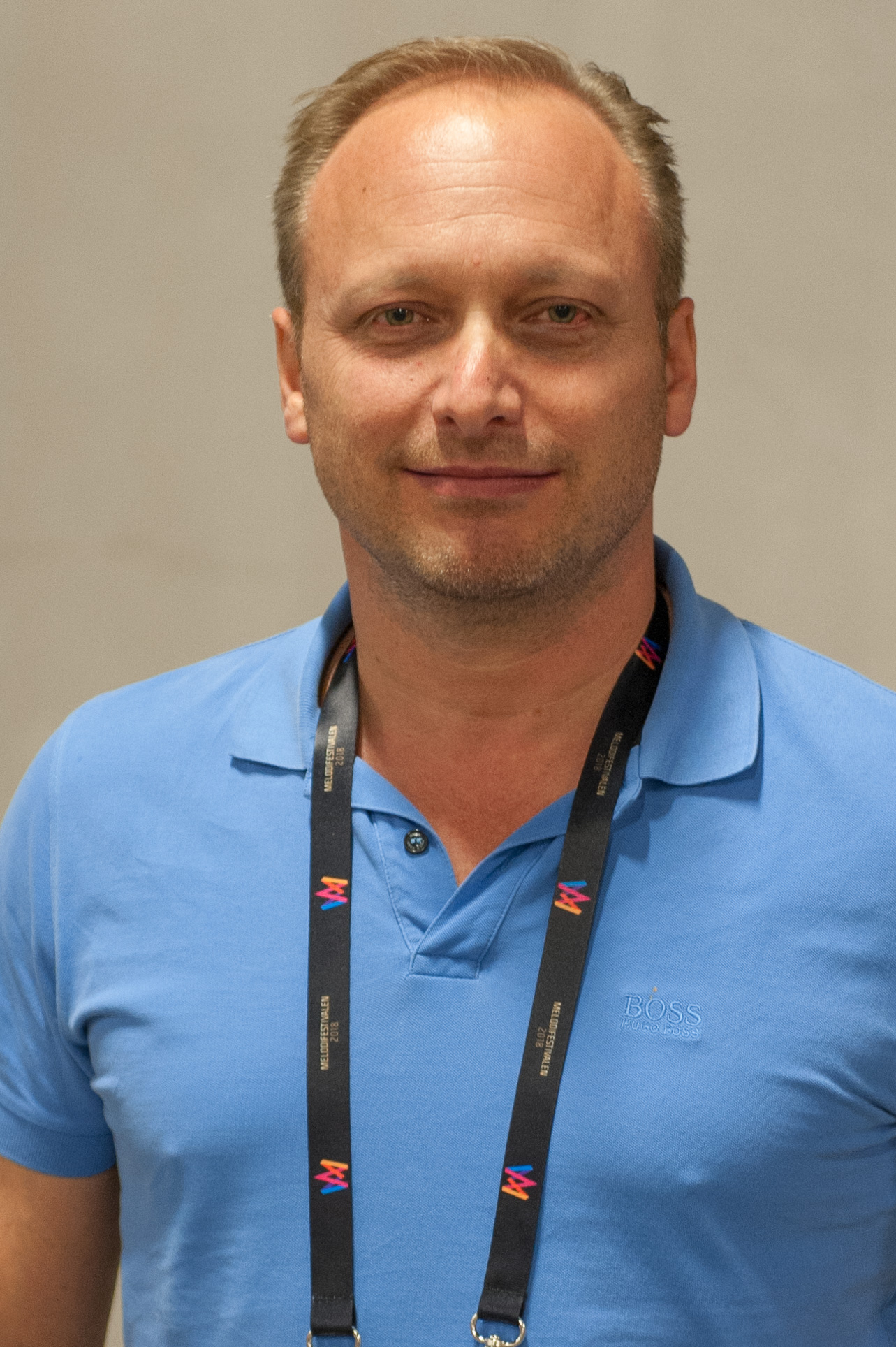
Robert Uhlmann, 2018

Robert Erik Uhlmann (born 14 March 1968) is a Swedish media executive and composer who has written/produced music for the artists Dr. Alban, Jonny Jakobsen, Arash, Basshunter, Margaret, Samantha Fox, Shaggy, Sean Paul, Smile.dk, Josefine Ridell amongst others. He is one of the founders of Extensive Music label.

== Released songs ==
Key
†	Written or produced by Robert Uhlmann
‡	Single
*	Promotional single
+	Compilation album song
^	Cover version
Non-album single	Released as a single, but did not appear on an album
Non-album song	Did not appear on an album

Name of song, artist(s), writer(s), producer(s), album and year of release
Title	Artist(s)	Writer(s)	Producer(s)	Album	Year	Ref.
"In My Cabana" ‡	Margaret	Anderz Wrethov; Arash Labaf; Linnea Deb; Robert Uhlmann	Unknown	Non-album single	2018	
"Love Me Love Me" ‡	Sara Sukurani	Robert Uhlmann; Arash Labaf; Alexander Papaconstantinou; Sara Sukurani	Unknown	Non-album single	2015	

- 1995 – Look Twice – "Go Away"
- 1995 – Look Twice – "Feel the Night"
- 1995 – Bushman – "No 1 Else"
- 1995 – Poco Loco – "I'm the One"
- 1996 – Poco Loco – "Come Everybody"
- 1997 – Dr. Alban – "Long Time Ago"
- 1998 – Dr. Bombay – "Calcutta (Taxi Taxi Taxi)"
- 1998 – Dr. Bombay – "S.O.S (The Tiger Took My Family)"
- 1998 – Dr. Bombay – "Rice & Curry"
- 1998 – Dr. Bombay – "Girlie Girlie"
- 1998 – Dr. Bombay – "Indy Dancing"
- 1998 – Smile.dk – "Butterfly"
- 1998 – Smile.dk – "Boys"
- 1998 – Smile.dk – "Mr. Wonderful"
- 1999 – Smile.dk – "Coconut"
- 1999 – Victoria Silvstedt – "Party Line"
- 2000 – Hanna Hedlund – "Anropar försvunnen"
- 2000 – Prima Donna – "Why Haven't I Told You (Dam-da-dam)"
- 2001 – Dr. Macdoo – "Macahula Dance"
- 2001 – Dr. Macdoo – "Under the Kilt"
- 2002 – Ann Winsborn – "Be the One"
- 2002 – Smile.dk – "Domo Domo"
- 2002 – Smile.dk – "Golden Sky"
- 2004 – Karma Club – "Lucky Star"
- 2004 – Günther – "Touch Me" (feat. Samantha Fox)
- 2004 – Aneela & Rebecca – "Bombay Dreams" (theme to film "Bombay Dreams")
- 2005 – Arash – "Boro Boro"
- 2005 – Arash – "Tike Tike Kardi"
- 2005 – Aneela – "Say Na Say Na" (from the film "Bluffmaster!")
- 2005 – Arash – "Temptation" (feat. Rebecca)
- 2005 – Arash – "Arash" (feat. Helena)
- 2008 – Arash – "Donya" (feat. Shaggy)
- 2008 – Arash – "Suddenly" (feat. Rebecca)
- 2008 – Arash – "Pure Love" (feat. Helena)
- 2008 – Basshunter – "Now You're Gone"
- 2008 – Basshunter – "All I Ever Wanted"
- 2008 – Basshunter – "Angel in the Night"
- 2008 – Basshunter – "I Miss You"
- 2008 – Arash – "Na Morya" (feat. Anna Semenovich)
- 2009 – Basshunter – "Every Morning"
- 2009 – Aysel Teymurzadeh and Arash – "Always"
- 2009 – Arash – "Kandi" (feat. Lumidee)
- 2010 – Arash – "Broken Angel" (feat. Helena)
- 2010 – Arash – "Dasa Bala" (feat. Timbuktu & Yag)
- 2010 – Basshunter – "Saturday"
- 2010 – Die Antwoord – "Enter the Ninja"
- 2011 – Arash – "Melody"
- 2012 – Fabrizio Faniello – "I Will Fight for You"
- 2013 – Arash – "She Makes Me Go" (feat. Sean Paul)
- 2014 – Margaret – "Wasted"
- 2014 – Arash – "One Day" (feat. Helena)
- 2014 – Arash – "Tekoon Bede"
- 2014 – Arash – "Sex Love Rock n Roll (SLR)" (feat. T-Pain)
- 2016 – Arash – "OMG" (feat. Snoop Dogg)
- 2016 – Mohombi – "Infinity"
- 2016 – Margaret – "Cool Me Down"
- 2017 – Margaret – "What You Do"
- 2017 – Arash – "Se Fue" (feat. Mohombi)
- 2017 – Arash – "Esmet ChiChie"
- 2018 – Arash – "Dooset Daram" (feat. Helena)
- 2018 – The Kemist – "Body Can't Lie" (feat. Nyanda)
- 2018 – Basshunter – "Masterpiece"
- 2019 – Arash – "One Night in Dubai" (feat. Helena)
- 2019 – Basshunter – "Home"
- 2020 – Arash vs Ilkay Sencan – "Mary Jane"
- 2020 – Ilkay Sencan, Era Istrefi, Arash – "No Maybes"
- 2020 – Lana Scolaro – "Charlie" (co-written with Tim Aeby, Basshunter, Linnea Deb and Svidden)
- 2020 – Marnik, Hard Lights – "Butterfly"
- 2020 – Alok, Ilkay Sencan – "Don't Say Goodbye" (feat. Tove Lo)
- 2021 – Marshmello x Arash – "Lavandia"
- 2021 – Arash – "Angels Lullaby" (feat. Helena)
- 2021 – Samra & Topic42 – "Ich bin weg (Boro Boro)" (feat. Arash)
- 2022 – Giorgos Mazonakis, Arash – "Tora Tora (Boro Boro)"
- 2022 – Basshunter – "End the Lies"
- 2023 – Basshunter – "Ingen kan slå (Boten Anna)" (Victor Leksell)
- 2024 – Arash – "Belarzoon"

== Personal life ==
He has a brother called Henrik.

== Sources ==
- Bushman (2)
- Robert Uhlmann - hitparade.ch
- Robert Uhlmann
- EXTENSIVEMUSIC
- Berggren, Olle (2001-04-05). "Malmö, lördag. Årets media-Blitz" [Malmö, Saturday. Media-blitz of the year]. Expressen (in Swedish). Sweden: Expressen.
- "Från vegmat till skivor" [From vegetarian food to records]. Sydsvenskan (in Swedish). Sweden. 2001-03-20.
