= Now You're Gone (Basshunter song) =

2007 single by Basshunter

Single by Basshunter featuring DJ Mental Theo's Bazzheadz

from the album Now You're Gone – The Album
- Released: 31 December 2007
- Recorded: 2007
- Genre: Eurodance
- Length: 2:28 (Radio Edit); 2:39 (Video Edit); 5:43 (DJ Alex Extended Mix)
- Label: Hard2Beat
- Songwriters: Basshunter; DJ Mental Theo's Bazzheadz
- Producers: Basshunter; Robert Uhlmann (Note: Robert Uhlmann not credited on the special version of LOL <(^^,)> album.)

Basshunter singles chronology
"Jingle Bells" (2006)	"Now You're Gone" (2007)	"Please Don't Go" (2008)

Alternative cover
- 2008 American release

Music video
- "Now You're Gone" on YouTube

"Now You're Gone" is a song performed by Swedish dance musician Basshunter in cooperation with DJ Mental Theo's Bazzheadz. The single uses the same music as "Boten Anna", Basshunter's major European hit in 2006, but its lyrics, performed in English by Sebastian Westwood, are completely different.

== Background ==
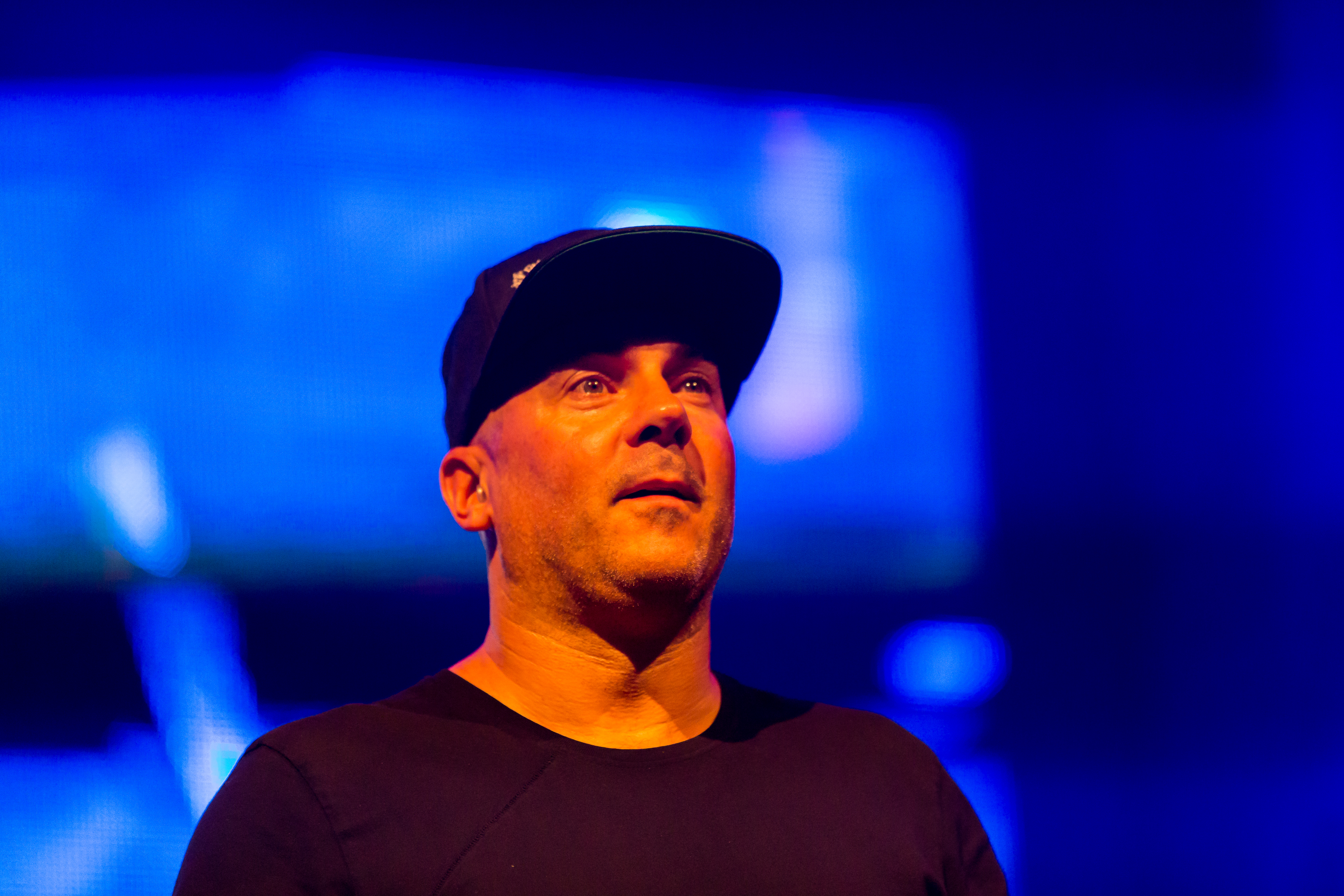
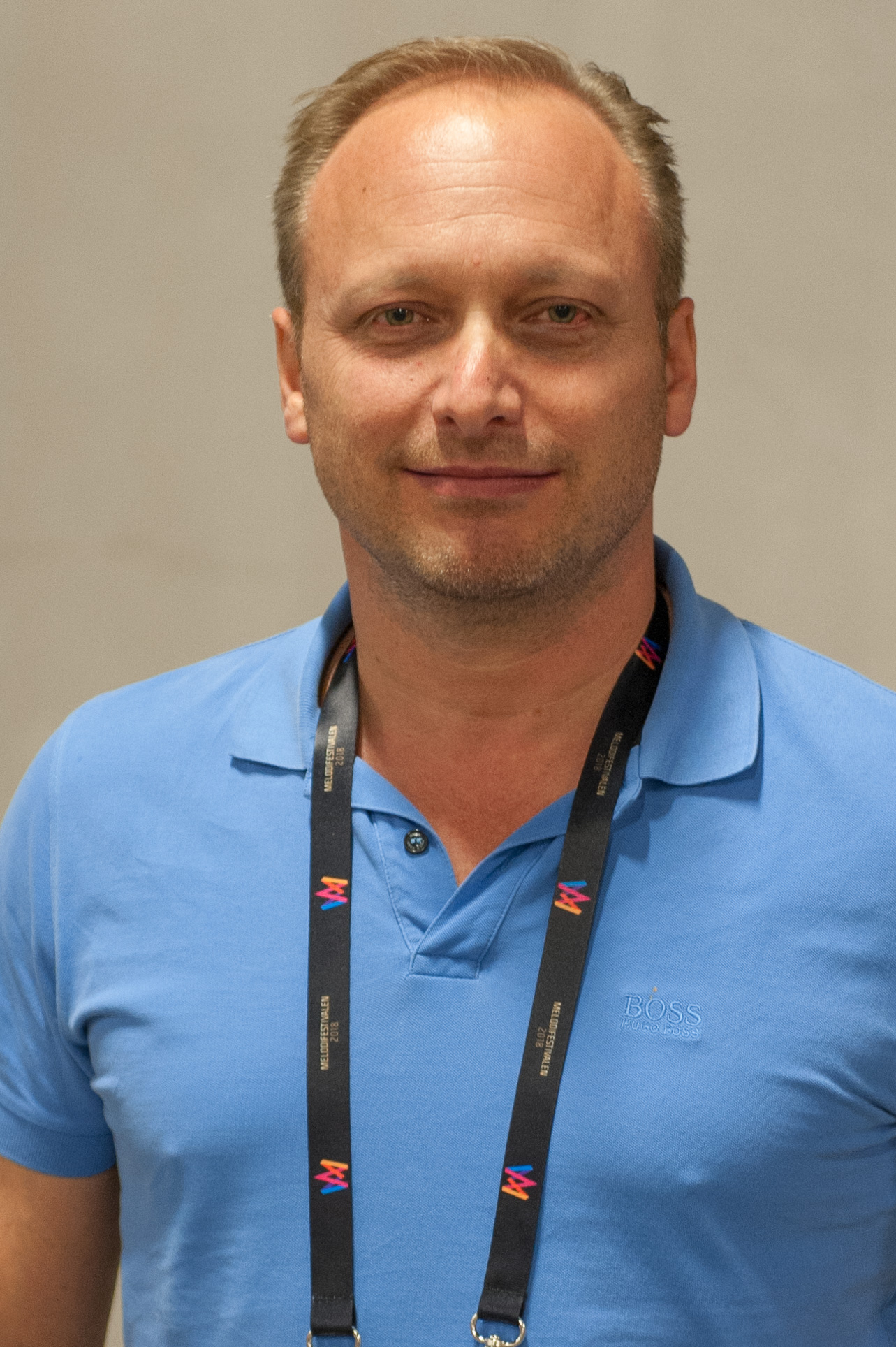
Dutch DJ Mental Theo's Bazzheadz collaborated with Swedish musician Basshunter on "Now You're Gone". Swedish music producer Robert Uhlmann produced the song with Basshunter.

In 2007, DJ Mental Theo used the "Boten Anna" instrumental to create a bootleg English-language version for his DJ sets in Magaluf, Mallorca. It was this song that eventually became released as a single.

== Critical reception ==
Professional ratings
Review scores
Source	Rating
Digital Spy	3/5 stars

Nick Levine from Digital Spy said that song has throbbing trance beats, arms-aloft chorus and pleasing hint of electropop which conjures up images of a dirty Swedish raver. Editor Michaelangelo Matos from the American website Idolator, as part of the Project X series, discussed the songs from the top ten of the chart from the second week of February 2008 of the British charts. Referring to the first from the list "Now You're Gone", he stated that the vocals and the house beat are very aggressive and are not suitable for American listeners. Jocke Sandström for Sundsvalls Tidning said that there are no words or grades to justify "Now You're Gone" and said that this is the song for people who have not yet discovered music. In 2020 song was included at number 39 in The Top 50 Greatest High Street Club Bangers of All Time by Vice.

== Charity ==
In February 2012, Norton Hill School's Quantock House organized a 20-hour charity sleep-over, during which students listened to "Now You're Gone" non-stop for 20-hours, which was considered the "endurance" part of the fundraiser. The event collected more than £2,000 for the charities Time is Precious and Cancer Research UK.

== Chart performance ==
In Sweden, "Now You're Gone" debuted at number 43 on Swedish singles chart on 10 January 2008, eventually peaking at two on 21 February.

In the United Kingdom, "Now You're Gone" debutated at number 14 on UK singles chart on 12 January with sale of 9,395 downloads. In the next week single peaked at number one and remained at the top spot for five weeks before being knocked off by Duffy's "Mercy" which also achieved a five-week run at the number one of the UK singles chart in 2008. "Now You're Gone" became the third and final song by a Swedish artist to top the UK singles chart in the 2000s decade after "Call on Me" by Eric Prydz in September and October 2004 and Kleerup and Robyn's "With Every Heartbeat" in August 2007. "Now You're Gone" became Britain's eight-best-selling single of 2008, selling 347,008 copies in first quarter of 2008 alone. It had sold 398,699 copies during debut of "All I Ever Wanted" on UK singles chart in June. As of 2018, the single has sold 667,000 copies. The song also topped the chart in Ireland where it became fourth-best-selling single of 2008.

In New Zealand, "Now You're Gone" entered the New Zealand singles chart at number 25 on 8 September 2008 reaching a peak of three after 14 weeks, on 15 December 2008. The single was the 14th-best-selling single of 2008 and 35th-best-selling single of 2009 and was certified platinum.

In France, "Now You're Gone" entered at number six on the French singles chart on 10 May 2008 and held this position for 3 weeks.

In the United States, the song charted on the Dance/Electronic Digital Song Sales and peaked at number 45. According to data published on 13 September 2008 it sold 95,000 copies since its release in May.

== Music video ==
The video was shot in Oslo, and features Iranian model Aylar Lie playing the lead female role.

== Track listing ==
- 2-track CD single
1. "Now You're Gone" (Radio Edit) – 2:34
2. "Now You're Gone" (DJ Alex Extended Mix) – 5:42
- CD maxi single
1. "Now You're Gone" (Radio Edit) – 2:34
2. "Now You're Gone" (Video Edit) – 2:39
3. "Now You're Gone" (DJ Alex Extended Mix) – 5:42
4. "Now You're Gone" (Sound Selektaz Remix) – 5:35
5. "Now You're Gone" (Fonzerelli Remix) – 6:27
6. "Now You're Gone" (Video)
- Australian and German CD single / Brazilian digital download
1. "Now You're Gone" (Radio Edit) – 2:36
2. "Now You're Gone" (DJ Alex Extended Mix) – 5:45
3. "Now You're Gone" (Sound Selektaz Remix) – 5:38
4. "Now You're Gone" (Fonzerelli Remix) – 6:29
5. "Boten Anna" (Radio Edit) – 3:30

== Charts ==
=== Weekly charts ===
2008–2009 weekly chart performance for "Now You're Gone"
Chart (2008–2009)	Peak position
Australia (ARIA)	78
Austria (Ö3 Austria Top 40)	14
Belgium (Ultratop 50 Wallonia)	5
Canada (Canadian Hot 100)	88
CIS Airplay (TopHit)	31
Denmark (Tracklisten)	14
Europe (European Hot 100 Singles)	4
Finland (Suomen virallinen lista)	8
France (SNEP)	6
Germany (GfK)	18
Hungary (Dance Top 40)	4
Ireland (IRMA)	1
Netherlands (Dutch Top 40 Tipparade)	7
New Zealand (Recorded Music NZ)	3
Norway (VG-lista)	10
Romania (Romanian Top 100)	2
Russia Airplay (TopHit)	33
Scottish Singles Sales (Official Charts)	1
Slovakia (Radio Top100 Oficiálna)	32
Sweden (Sverigetopplistan)	2
Switzerland (Schweizer Hitparade)	29
UK Singles (Official Charts)	1
UK Dance (Official Charts)	1
US Hot Dance Airplay (Billboard)	1

2010 weekly chart performance for "Now You're Gone"
Chart (2010)	Peak position
US Dance/Electronic Digital Song Sales (Billboard)	45
UK Indie (Official Charts)	11

2023 weekly chart performance for "Now You're Gone"
Chart (2023)	Peak position
Hungary (Single Top 40)	34

=== Year-end charts ===
2008 year-end chart performance for "Now You're Gone"
Chart (2008)	Position
Austria (Ö3 Austria Top 40)	62
Australia (Top 50 Dance Singles)	37
Belgium (Ultratop 50 Wallonia)	54
CIS (TopHit)	94
Europe (European Hot 100 Singles)	14
France (SNEP)	16
Hungary (Dance Top 40)	39
Ireland (IRMA)	4
New Zealand (Recorded Music NZ)	14
Russia Airplay (TopHit)	56
Sweden (Sverigetopplistan)	32
UK Singles (OCC)	8
US Dance/Mix Show Airplay (Billboard)	11

2009 year-end chart performance for "Now You're Gone"
Chart (2009)	Position
New Zealand (Recorded Music NZ)	35

=== Decade-end charts ===
Decade-end chart performance for "Now You're Gone"
Chart (2000–2009)	Position
Russia Airplay (TopHit)	187
UK Top 100 Songs of the Decade	95

== Certifications and sales ==
Certifications and sales for "Now You're Gone"
Region	Certification	Certified units/sales
Denmark (IFPI Danmark)	Gold	45,000^{‡}
New Zealand (RMNZ)	Platinum	15,000^{*}
United Kingdom (BPI)	2× Platinum	1,200,000^{‡}
United States	—	95,000
^{*} Sales figures based on certification alone.^{‡} Sales+streaming figures based on certification alone.

== Awards ==
Awards for "Now You're Gone"
Award	Year	Category	Result	Ref.
Eska Music Award	2008	Radioactive Hit of the Year Era	Won	
MTV Europe Music Award	2008	Most Addictive Track	Nominated	
The Record of the Year	2008	None	9th place	

== Other versions ==
In 2008 "Now You're Gone" has been parodied by former BBC Radio 1 host, Chris Moyles. It was also interpolated by Crazy Frog in song "Everyone", on its third studio album Everybody Dance Now. In 2019, during Jingle Bell Ball concert Tom Walker performed a Christmassy rendition of "Now You're Gone". Tom Walker is also the author of another song with the same title, featuring Zara Larsson.

== See also ==
- List of UK singles chart number ones of the 2000s
- List of UK Dance Singles Chart number ones of 2008
- List of UK Singles Downloads Chart number ones of the 2000s
- List of best-selling singles of the 2000s (decade) in the United Kingdom
- List of Platinum singles in the United Kingdom awarded since 2000
- List of number-one singles of 2008 (Ireland)
- List of best-selling singles and albums of 2008 in Ireland
- New Zealand top 50 singles of 2008
- New Zealand top 50 singles of 2009
- List of number-one dance airplay hits of 2008 (U.S.)
