= History of the Internet in Sweden =

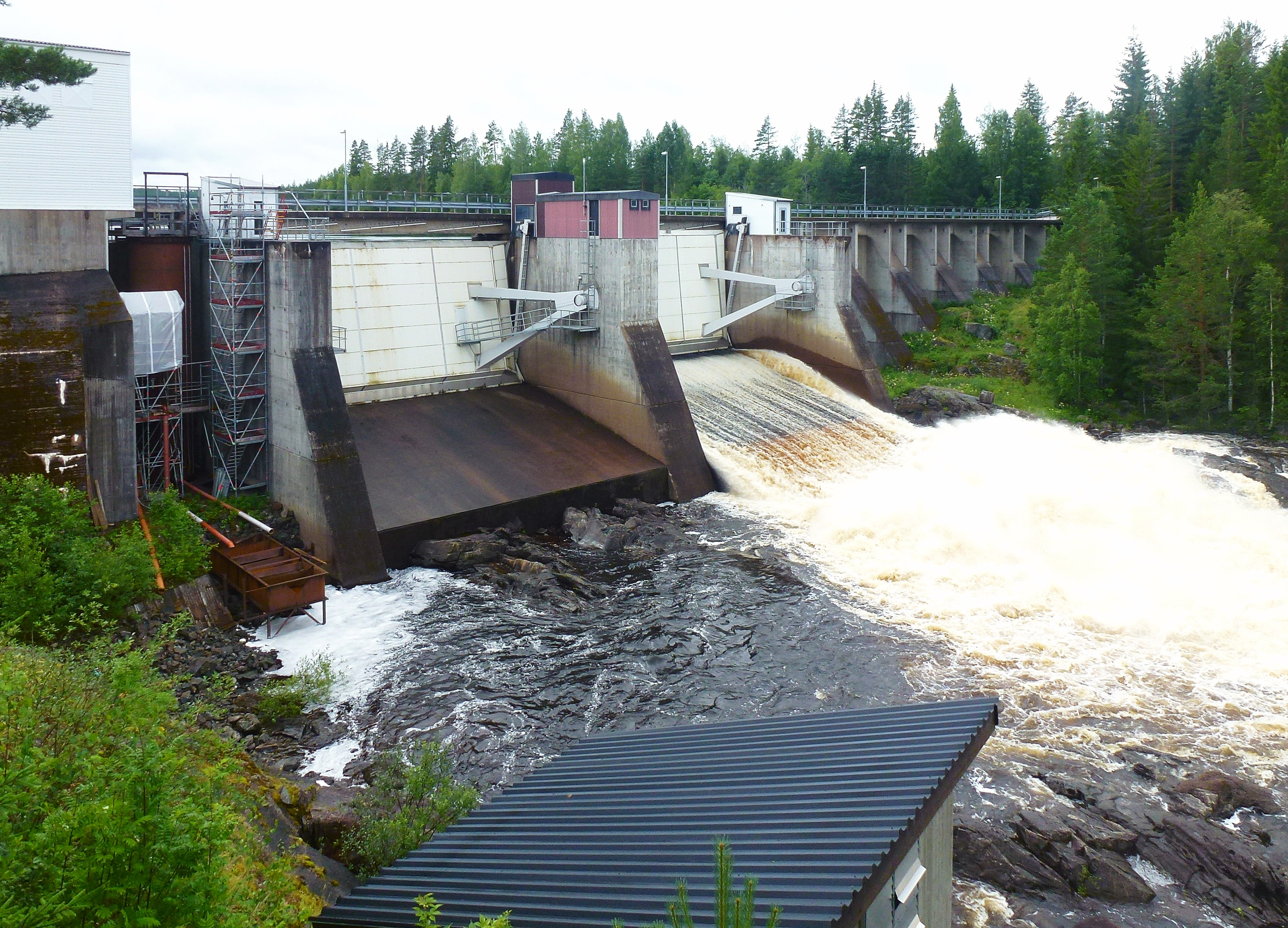
Mockfjärd hydroelectric power station, Sweden. The early Swedish TIDAS computer network was created to monitor the power grid.

The history of Internet in Sweden began with colleges and universities in the 1980s and then expanded through commercial operators to large companies and, in 1994, to the general public.

In the 1970s, an innovation developed in Sweden by Torsten Cegrell was built into ARPANET, the precursor to the Internet. By the early 1980s, data links were established between some colleges and universities using modem access and UUCP.

The first Internet connection in Sweden can be considered to have been in 1984, when a Swedish network was connected to the ARPANET using TCP/IP. In 1988 direct access to the Internet was created in the form of the SUNET and NORDUnet university and college networks, which in turn was connected to the USA. In 1991, Swipnet started operations and became Sweden's first ISP. In 1994, providers started offering Internet access to private individuals.

In 1994, Swedish Prime Minister Carl Bildt and Bill Clinton became the first heads of government in the world to email each other. In 1997, the Swedish government decided that anyone who bought a personal computer at home could deduct the cost. The aim of the reform was to increase digital literacy in Sweden. This decision, known as the Home PC Reform, contributed to an increase in the use of computers and the internet by Swedes. In 2003, some telephony also moved online, through Niklas Zennström's Skype service. Skype was then bought by the auction site eBay for billions. The service made international calls free, among other things. File sharing and online privacy became an increasingly important issue, especially for young adults who grew up with the Internet. In 2006, the Pirate Party was founded, and in 2009 it was voted into the European Parliament. Also in 2006, paradoxically, a service was founded that would kill file sharing of music in Sweden: the streaming music service Spotify.

== 1960s, 1970s and 1980s ==
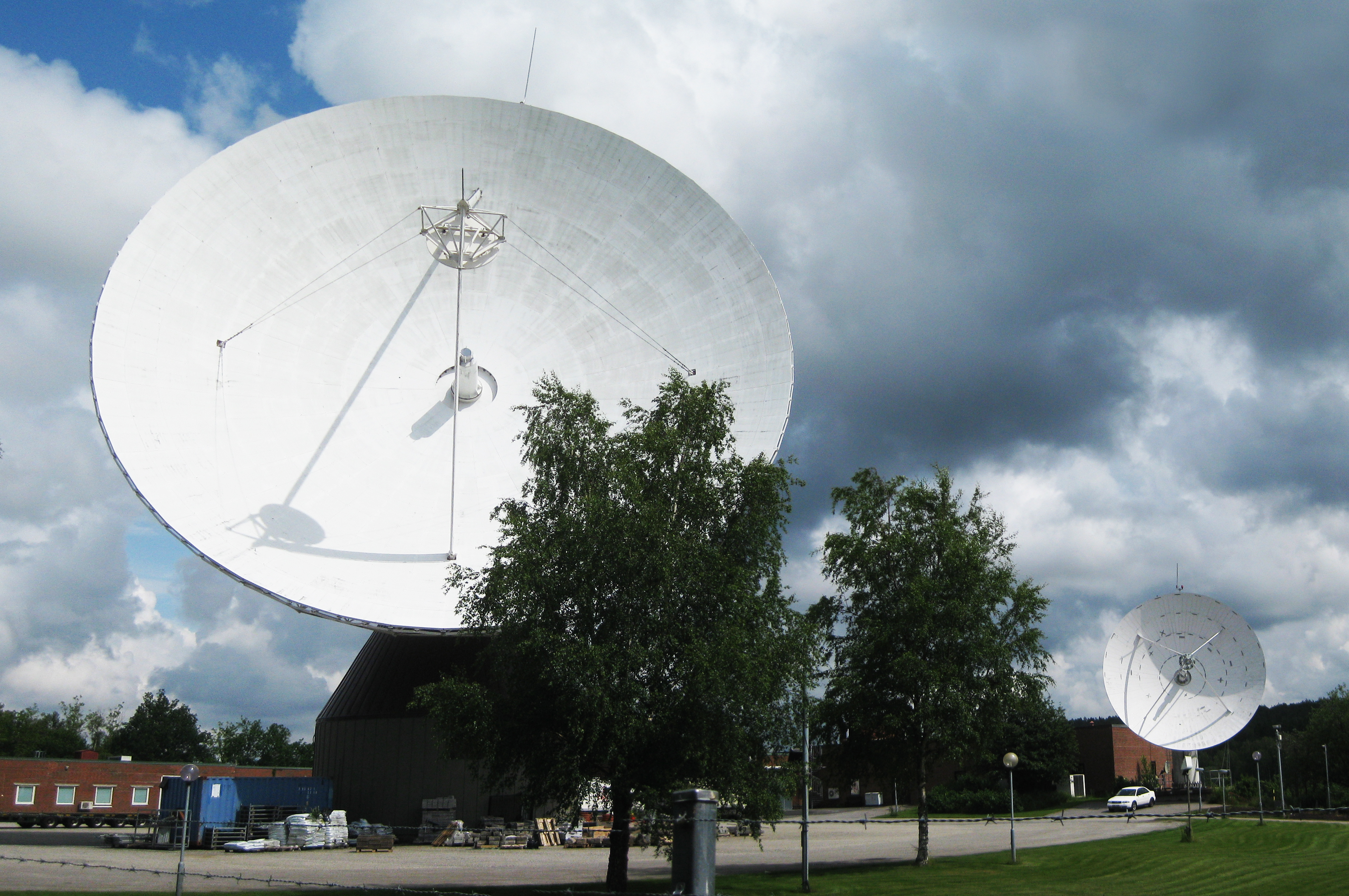
Initially, the Tanum Teleport ground station (in Tanumshede, Sweden) was jointly owned by Denmark, Finland, Norway and Sweden. The facility acted as a connection point when the Internet's predecessor ARPANET went international for the first time in the early 1970s.

The Internet's predecessor, the ARPANET, carried its first packets in 1969 in the United States using data communication techniques invented and first-implemented by Donald Davies for the NPL network in the United Kingdom. The network research community formed the International Network Working Group (INWG) in 1972, of which Kjell Samuelson, a doctoral student at Stockholm University, was a member. The ARPANET grew rapidly and, in June 1973, the first connection outside the United States was a transatlantic satellite link to the Norwegian Seismic Array (NORSAR), via the Tanum Teleport Earth Station in Sweden. The following month, this connection was extended to Peter Kirstein's research group at University College London, which evolved into SATNET.

In the 1960s, ASEA was commissioned by Vattenfall to create a computer-based monitoring system to reduce the risk of disturbances in Sweden's power grid. This grid was connected with those of Finland, Norway and Denmark. Up until then, the telephone was the main tool for engineers monitoring the power grid. For this purpose an ARPANET-like network, TIDAS, was developed by ASEA between 1972 and 1975. The TIDAS network included split horizon route advertisement, an innovation to prevent routing loops developed by Swedish researcher Torsten Cegrell, which was soon built into the ARPANET and thus the Internet.

The KOM system became central to the history of the Internet in Sweden. In 1978, it was developed at the Stockholm Computer Center, by Jacob Palme and Torgny Tholerus. The KOM system was a Bulletin board system (BBS) where users could connect to a central computer and discuss with each other, play games and exchange files. From 1982, users of the KOM system could also send e-mails via a connection to ARPANET.

In 1979, Televerket started its Datavision service (later called Videotex), to which people connected with modems and special software and subscriptions. It was offered commercially in 1982. Many large companies adopted the service, but otherwise it was not widely used. The service was discontinued in 1993. The first Swedish non-profit BBS was started in 1980 by the ABC-Club. An association for users of the ABC 80 home computer.

Patrik Fältström was a mathematics student in Stockholm in the early 1980s when he was hired to help build and test the infrastructure for the ARPANET.

=== TCP/IP or X.25 ===
In the 1980s, there was disagreement about whether TCP/IP or X.25 should be used as the technology for communicating information over packet-switching networks. Telecommunications companies in Europe and North America preferred X.25 virtual circuits, which had built-in error control and made it easier for operators to track connection usage, and they built public data networks based on this protocol. In Sweden, Televerket's system for this was called Datapak. In the end, adoption of TCP/IP overwhelmed other protocols. Some consider that the Internet was born on January 1, 1983, when ARPANET switched from two-way communication with NCP to TCP/IP, although SATNET, including Norway and University College London, adopted TCP/IP the previous year. The X.25 protocol is still used in private networks that need extra security, such as credit card terminals and ATMs.

=== E-mail ===
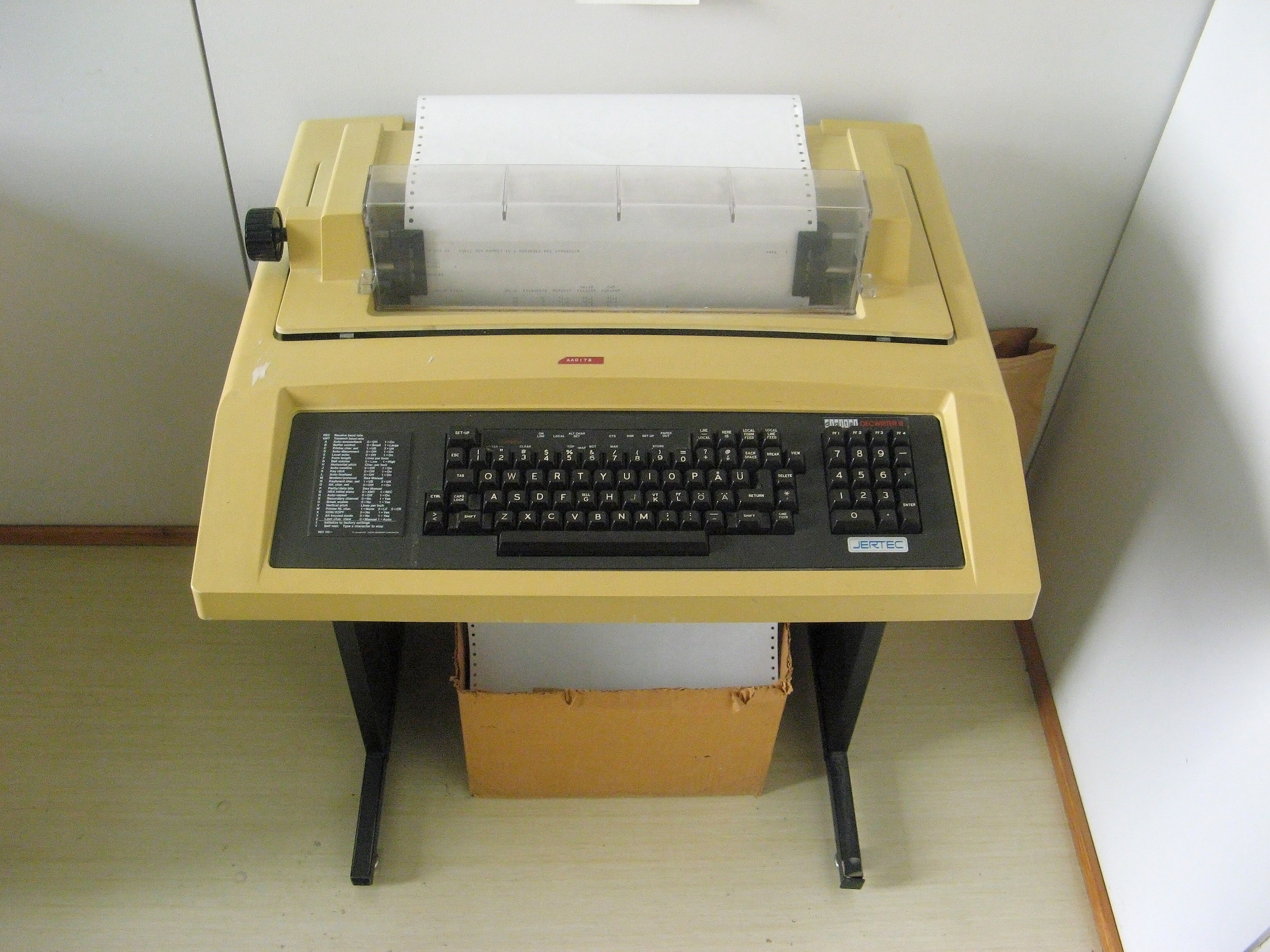
Digital DECwriter III, a computer terminal, used when the first e-mail was received in Sweden.

A UUCP link was established via EUnet in 1982 connecting Sweden, the Netherlands, Denmark and the United Kingdom. The first e-mail message received in Sweden was sent by Jim McKie from the Amsterdam Mathematics Centre to Björn Eriksen at ENEA AB in Stockholm on April 7, 1983. To receive the message, Eriksen had connected a VAX 780 computer to the European part of the Internet with a 1200 bit/s modem. The computer terminal that received the message, a Digital DECwriter III, has been located at the National Museum of Science and Technology in Stockholm since October 2023.

In the early summer of 1984, Sweden got its first own part of the Internet, when research assistant Ulf Bilting at Chalmers University of Technology in Gothenburg connected the local network at the Department of Computer Science as IP network number 192.5.50.0, which is then connected to ARPANET.

=== University pioneers ===
During the 1980s, the development of the Internet in Sweden was largely about universities. The university network SUNET was created and connected the Swedish universities. This enabled researchers and students to communicate digitally with each other and to send messages and documents. Gradually, the Nordic university networks were also connected to NORDUnet, and in December 1988, the Nordic universities were linked to Princeton University in New Jersey. This gave students and researchers in Sweden real access to the Internet. Between 1979 and 1988, the university network SUNET used Televerket's X.25 and then abandoned it permanently in favor of leased direct connections.

Outside the university system, ordinary people still had to make do with Bulletin boards. The computers in these were reached by ordinary telephone and often only had space for one call at a time. It could therefore only be used by one user at a time and was often located in the home of the owner of the BBS. In 1985, a new BBS was launched by the ABC Club. This version allowed multiple simultaneous users, thanks to a DEC-10 computer available to the ABC Club, and thus real-time discussions. The design of the discussion forum was reminiscent of the American Usenet system, with a feature similar to online services such as the American Prodigy and the British Compunet. This BBS was accessible on a non-profit basis via a modem connection, and discussion groups included many of the people who would later become important key figures in the coming electronic Sweden: Sven Wickberg, Anders Franzén, Henrik Schyffert and Jan-Inge Flücht. In 1986, Björn Eriksen registered the .se top-level domain, which he administered until 1997.

== 1990s ==
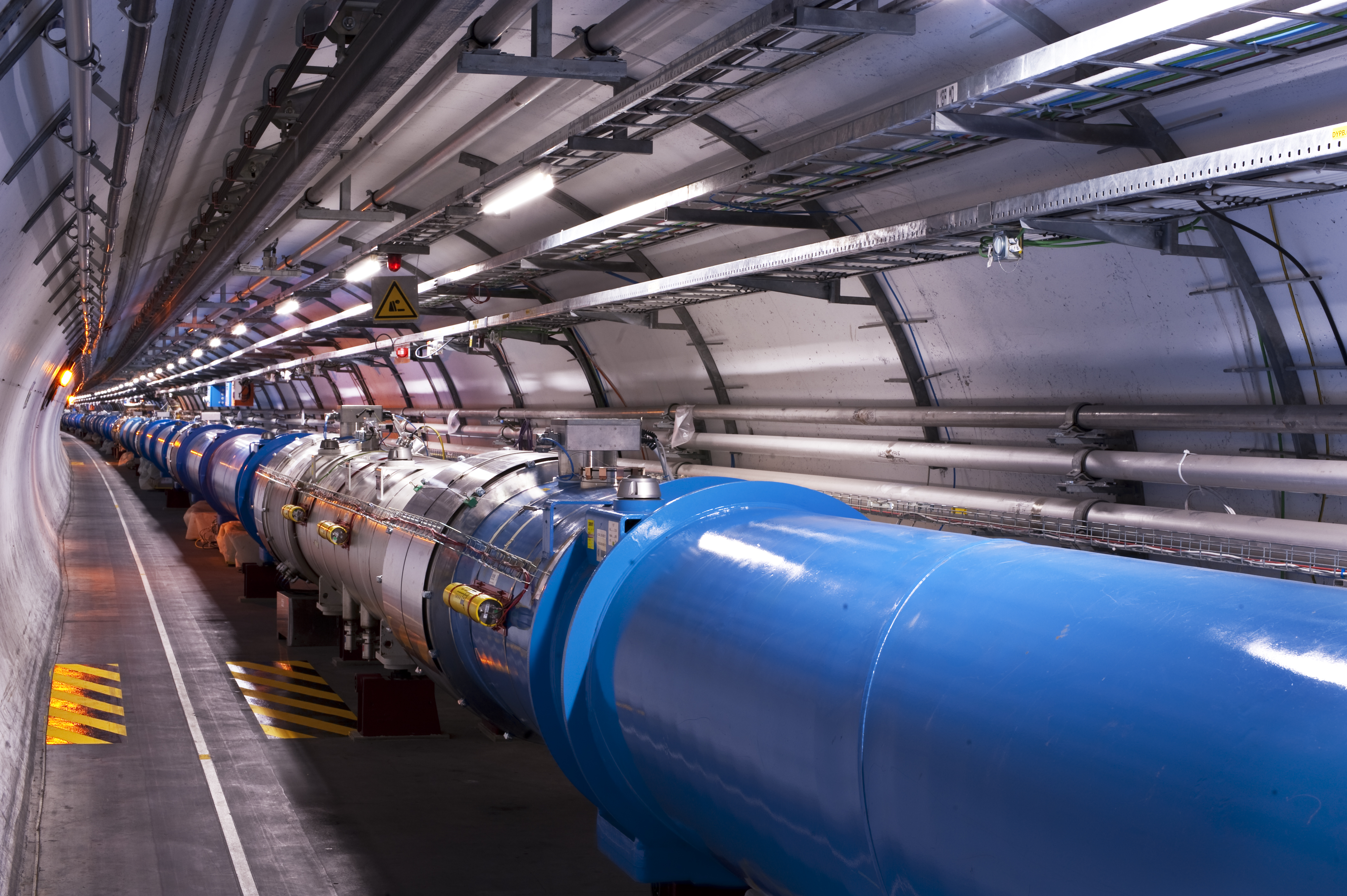
The LHC tunnel, CERN, Switzerland. The World Wide Web was invented by English computer scientist Tim Berners-Lee while working at CERN.

In 1990, Tim Berners-Lee created the World Wide Web. The Web is free and free to use for both developers and surfers. The first site was launched in 1991 at the CERN research center in Switzerland, and still exists. In May 1990, an initiative was taken to form the Swedish Network Users' Society (SNUS) to promote the use of networks based on TCP/IP. The society was also instrumental in enabling companies and ordinary Swedes to start using the network the following year when Swipnet, part of the Stenbeck sphere, became the first commercial ISP. Televerket could have been first, but they preferred X.25 technology and declined. However, Televerket, via Unisource, created Tipnet as a quick but half-hearted attempt at a counter move.

In 1990 Nordunet's Atlantic link to the USA was upgraded to 64 kbit/s, in 1991 it was upgraded to 128 kbit/s and in 1992 to 512 kbit/s. Televerket's monopoly on fixed lines ended in 1993. In the same year, Linköping University's Lysator computer association installed a fixed connection in the Ryd student housing area via a microwave link under the project name Rydnet.

=== Popularity increases, web agencies and forums are launched ===
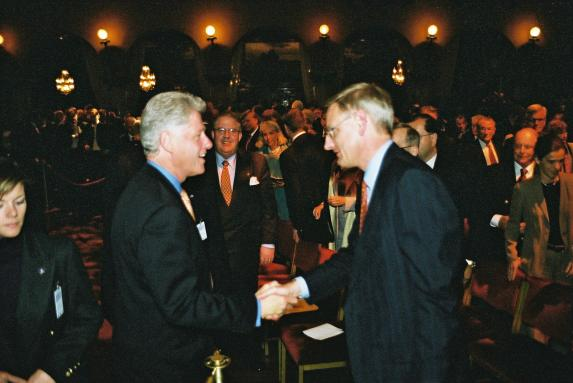
Bill Clinton and Carl Bildt, who were the first heads of government to exchange emails with each other.

In Sweden, 1994 was a key year in the development of the Internet. Carl Bildt and Bill Clinton were the first heads of government in the world to exchange emails, and in the same year the government donated SEK one billion to the newly created Knowledge Foundation (KK-stiftelsen) to invest in technology, including in schools. At the same time, the IT Commission was formed, which launched a number of digital initiatives, including in schools. In connection with the 1994 Swedish general election, the election results were sent out by e-mail for the first time, and many Swedish newspapers acquired their first websites as a result. The very first to do so was Aftonbladet, which put its society pages on the web on August 25, 1994.

In May 1994, Kuai Connection opened. In I Ching, Kuai (or Guài) means breakthrough and determination. Shortly thereafter in July 1994, 24-year-old Ragnar Lönn started Algonet. Älgö-nät, after Älgö in Nacka where Lönn grew up. These were aimed at private individuals (Algonet initially hoped for 400 paying customers) and got the common man to start surfing in larger numbers. The cost of use consisted of a fixed monthly fee and a per-minute fee in the form of a call rate which, due to Telia's natural monopoly on telephony, made this fee high. As long term connectivity was expensive, some resorted to illegal methods such as toll-free numbers with hijacked credit cards to stay connected for a long time at no cost.

At this time, the Internet started to grow in Sweden, business leaders acquired email addresses and web agencies were started. In 1995, a new cable was laid across the Atlantic, bringing the connection to 34 Mbit/s, which significantly increased the Swedish capacity. At the time it was the most powerful international connection, the previous record being 6 Mbit/s. In 1995, Sveriges Television's news program Rapport broadcast a report on the Internet every day for a week. In 1995, 2% of the Swedish population (over 12 years) had access to the Internet at home while 25% had access to a computer at home.

In 1995, the punk magazine Flashback also launched its first website. Readers could chat via an IRC channel and participate in mailing lists. It was not until five years later that the discussion forum with which the name Flashback is associated today was launched.

At the same time, Telia launched its Passagen portal. Web portals are a concept that was in vogue at the time. During these years, the number of websites on the Internet exploded and in 1996 an Internet subscription became the Christmas present of the year in Sweden. At the same time, Rickard Eriksson started the community Stajlplejs (which was commercialized and renamed LunarStorm in 2000), which was one of the world's very first social networks. The site became popular in Sweden, especially among young people.

=== More and more people are offered internet access ===
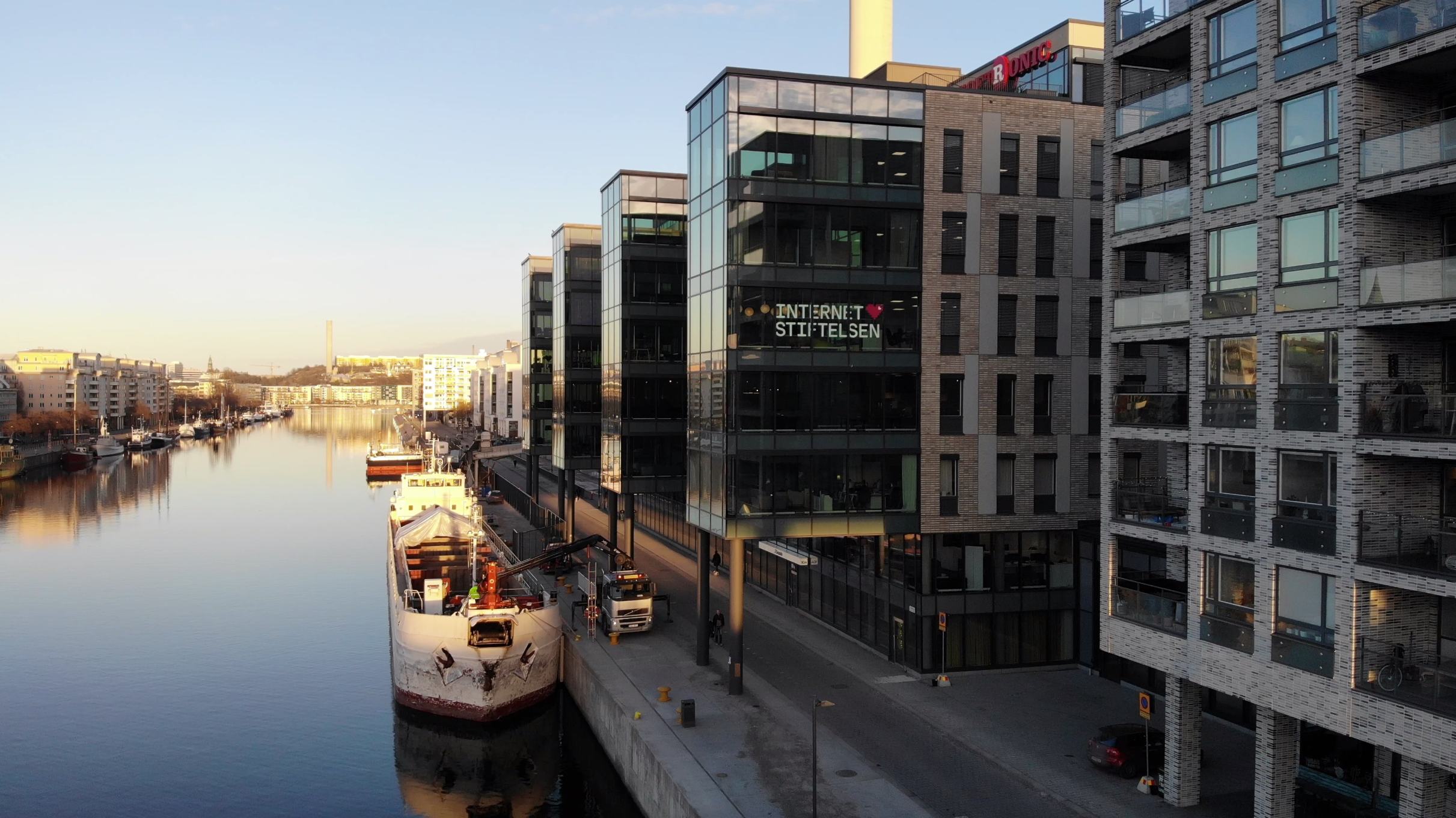
The Swedish Internet Foundation acts to ensure positive development of the Internet, is responsible for the Internet's Swedish top-level domain, .se and for Internetmuseum, a Swedish digital museum that opened in 2014.

In 1996, the municipal company Ängelholms Kabel-TV AB was one of the first in the country to offer internet access via Cable TV modems with an Ethernet interface to 7,000 households with a connection fee of SEK 2,000 and a monthly fee of SEK 300. During the first year, about 100 households took up the offer and connected. In the same year, Umeå's Irrblosset housing association was one of the first to connect to the internet with 10 Mbit/s Ethernet at a low fixed monthly cost. Other similar projects in Umeå were Baldakinen and Kvarteret Vittran. Already in 1996, many student residences in Umeå had a fixed 10Mbit/s internet connection.

In 1997, Telia tested unlimited ADSL broadband and optical fiber to students and Internet cafés in Sundsvall, in a pilot project called Supernet. The project tested and demonstrated many of the applications that we take for granted today, e.g. live streamed radio and TV channels, web-based multimedia and interactive education and live video meeting services. The services were produced together with external partners, e.g. Sundsvalls Tidning/Radio RIX, Mid Sweden University, Sundsvall Municipality and others.

In 1997, SUNET sold its and Sweden's only Internet exchange point (D-GIX) to the company Netnod after the government requested in 1996 that the Internet in Sweden be formalized and secured. In 1998, an Internet exchange point was also opened in Gothenburg and more followed.

Until 1997, Björn Eriksen handled the registration of all .se domains in Sweden on his own. He did this in his spare time from his basement. The possibility of getting your own .se domain name was reserved for companies and organizations. An investigation suggested that a foundation should take over the registration, and on October 8, 1997, Björn Eriksen transferred responsibility to the newly established The Swedish Internet Foundation.

In 1997, the Swedish government decided that anyone who bought a home computer could deduct the cost. The aim of the reform was to increase digital literacy in Sweden. This decision, called the Home PC Reform, revolutionized PC sales and led to many Swedish households getting their first computer and internet connection.

At this time, IT companies such as Framfab, Icon Medialab and Spray Network were at the forefront of internet development in Sweden and both Sweden and the world were in the dot-com bubble. Jonas Birgersson, CEO of Framfab, was called "Broadband Jesus" and symbolized a new type of business leader. Birgersson was passionate about creating a fiber network across Sweden and likened it to the 21st century equivalent of the 19th century railway expansion. In 1999, Bredbandsbolaget was launched and announced on the same day that HSB's 350,000 condominiums would be connected with broadband, which accounted for about 10% of the total number of apartment buildings. The aim was to make surfing, which had hitherto been done via modems over thin telephone wires, really fast. Telia countered by saying that it would invest SEK 1.4 billion. Soon a market was created where Bredbandsbolaget and Telia were just two of several players. In 2001, ADSL was made available, in beginning only from Telia who owned the existing copper telephone lines.

== 2000s ==
In the early 2000s, the dot-com bubble burst. On March 6, 2000, the stock market fell and many companies were dragged down with it. Before the fall, Ericsson accounted for almost 40% of the total value of the Nasdaq Stockholm (SEK 1,800 billion). In two and a half years, the company's share price fell from SEK 826 to SEK 16.85. Other Swedish companies affected by the fall were e-commerce sites Boo.com and Letsbuyit.com.

In 2001, the encyclopedia Wikipedia was launched and in the same year the Swedish-language Wikipedia was launched. The similar Swedish encyclopedia Susning.nu was also launched that year and was for many years larger than Wikipedia in Sweden.

ADSL was introduced in 2001 in 25 prioritized locations via Telia's ADSL service, with 150 kbit/s transmission speed and 512 kbit/s reception speed. Initially, Telia tried to charge per amount of data transmitted, but this was soon abandoned in the emerging competitive situation.

In 2000, 51% of the Swedish population (over 12 years) had access to the Internet at home while 62% had access to a computer at home. In five years, internet access had increased by 49 percentage points. Two percent had access to broadband.

=== Gaming, blogs, censorship, file sharing ===
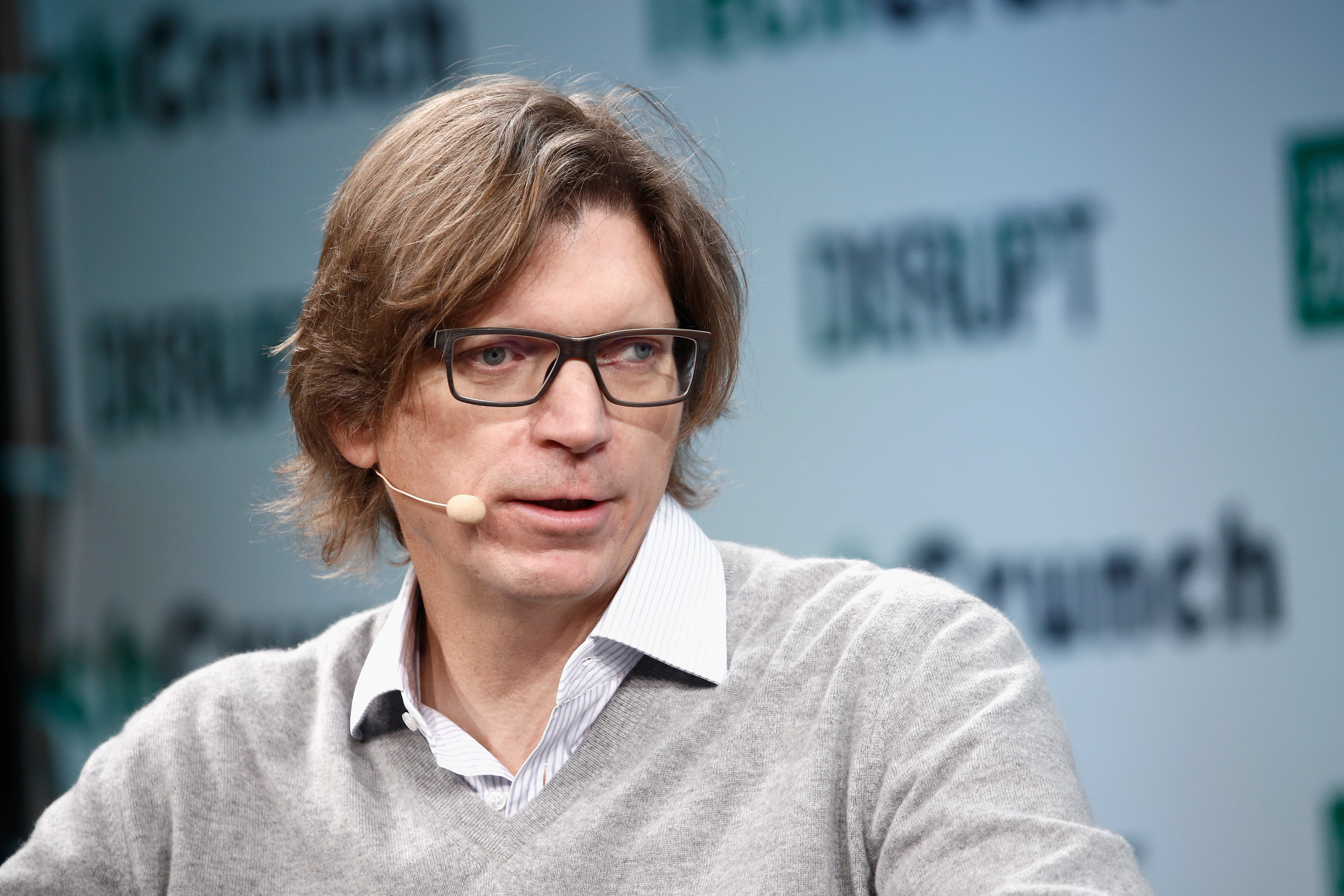
Niklas Zennström created the file-sharing service Kazaa. In 2003, part of telephony moved online through his service Skype, which made international calls free.

During this period, computer gaming increasingly moved online. In 2001, the Swedish team Ninjas in Pyjamas won the first world championship in Counter-Strike.

Music in MP3 format started to gain ground against the CD. Niklas Zennström created the file-sharing service Kazaa which, together with Napster, disrupted the music industry as files can be shared between users for free. As a result of the increase in file sharing, Piratbyrån and Rättighetsalliansen were founded. The Swedish BitTorrent site The Pirate Bay is also launched, where anyone can download movies, computer programs and games.

In 2003, some telephony also moved online, through Niklas Zennström's Skype service. Skype was then bought by the auction site EBay for billions. The service made international calls free, among other things.

In the mid-2000s, the web began to rely more on interaction and collaboration rather than static websites; some call this phenomenon Web 2.0. In 2005, YouTube was launched, followed the next year by Twitter and Facebook, which quickly became popular in Sweden. These services are based on users' material, which is something that the Swedes had already been good at with social networks such as LunarStorm and Skunk. During this period, in the mid-2000s, the phenomenon of blogs became very popular. One of the Swedish pioneers and most popular blogs at the time was run by Isabella Löwengrip, then better known as "Blondinbella".

As more and more of our lives moved online, file sharing and online privacy became an increasingly important issue, especially for young adults. In 2006, the Pirate Party was founded. The party stands for privacy, free culture and the restriction of copyright and patents. In the 2009 European Parliament election, they were one of the big winners of the election when they were elected to the European Parliament with 7.1% of the vote.

In 2006, the streaming service Spotify was also founded, by the then 23-year-old Daniel Ek and Tradedoubler founder Martin Lorentzon. In 2008, the service was launched to the public and became very popular, killing much of the music file sharing in Sweden.

The Sweden Democrats' website was shut down on February 9, 2006, after an official at the Ministry for Foreign Affairs and personnel from the Swedish Security Service contacted the web hosting company Levonline AB. This led to the resignation of Foreign Minister Laila Freivalds.

In 2007, the iPhone was launched and this, along with the emergence of other smartphones, has had a major impact on internet use in Sweden. Compared to the time before the launch of the iPhone in 2007, Swedes spend four to five times as much time online in 2020.

In 2009, a highly publicized verdict was handed down against The Pirate Bay; its representatives Fredrik Neij, Gottfrid Svartholm Warg, Peter Sunde and Carl Lundström were sentenced to prison and damages of SEK 46 million for copyright infringement. According to The Pirate Bay itself, it accounted for 40% of the world's internet traffic at one point. The site lives on, although file sharing has declined to some extent, due to successful legal alternatives.

== 2010s ==
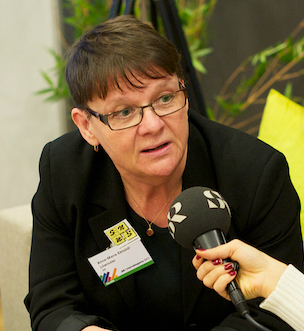
Anne-Marie Eklund Löwinder, the first Swede to be elected to the Internet Hall of Fame and who held one of the seven keys to the DNS root zone, 2022 succeeded by Pia Gruvö.

In 2010, around 92% of the Swedish population used the internet, making Sweden the country with the highest ratio of internet users to population in the EU. Across Europe, only Iceland is ahead with 97%. In 2011, 5% of the Swedish population (over 12 years) had access to a tablet computer at home and 27% used a smartphone.

At that time, it was common to watch movies and series through services such as Netflix, HBO Nordic, Viaplay and SVT Play. A game that made a big impact at this time is Minecraft, which was launched for purchase in 2011. The game was created by the Swede Markus "Notch" Persson from Norsborg. In the game, users can build their own worlds in an interface that to some extent resembles Lego. When "Notch" sold the company to Microsoft a few years later, he became a multi-billionaire.

In the 2010s, Sweden excelled when it came to successful startup companies in the technology sector. By 2018, Sweden had produced the most unicorn companies in the world per capita, after Silicon Valley, and was high in the number of "exits", i.e. start-ups that were either sold to another company or listed on the stock exchange. These successes have been attributed to Sweden's strong and long engineering tradition, openness to new ideas, early and widespread use of the internet, social safety nets, the Home PC Reform and lessons learned from the dot-com bubble.

In 2013, security expert Anne-Marie Eklund Löwinder became the first Swede to be elected to the Internet Hall of Fame and who held one of the seven keys to the DNS root zone. She was succeeded in 2022 by defense researcher and crypto strategist Pia Gruvö. The following year saw the launch of the Global Commission on Internet Governance, an initiative to examine the future of internet governance. Carl Bildt was appointed to lead the work.

In September 2013, PewDiePie, aka Felix Kjellberg, became the world's most subscribed YouTuber. At the time, he had 13 million followers and was earning millions on his YouTube channel, where he plays and comments on computer games. Three years later, in 2016, he had 45 million subscribers and Time ranked him as one of the world's 100 most influential people.

In 2014, Telia discontinued Dial-up Internet access.

On December 4, 2014, the Swedish Internetmuseum was inaugurated.

In 2017, 69% of the Swedish population (over 12 years) had access to a tablet in their home, an increase of 64 percentage points since 2011. In 2017, 93% of the population used a smartphone, an increase of 66 percentage points since 2011.

On March 1, 2018, the Löfven I cabinet introduced a national internet guarantee, which means that no matter where in Sweden you live, you should have access to digital services. The government therefore provides support to private individuals to give them telephony and internet of at least 10Mbit/s. The support is administered by the Swedish Post and Telecom Authority. On 1 September, the government established a new authority: the Agency for Digital Government (DIGG or the Digitalization Agency) whose task is to support, coordinate and follow up on digitalization in Swedish public administration. The agency was created to reduce the fragmentation of the governance of Swedish digital administration and is, among other things, the supervisory authority for the Web Content Accessibility Guidelines.

According to the OECD, Sweden is a leader in the use of digital technology and has smaller digital divides than most other countries. According to the Swedish Internet Foundation, just over a million Swedes felt that they were living in a digital exclusion at the end of the decade. Older age groups in particular rarely used the internet. In 2018, a UK survey showed that Sweden had the second fastest broadband in the world at 46 Mbit/s. Only Singapore was faster at 60.39 Mbit/s.

== 2020s ==
The 2020s started with the COVID-19 pandemic, which led to increased use of the internet on several fronts in society. For example, many workplaces switched to working from home and many schools switched from school education to distance education. Social distancing was recommended in Sweden, leading many to stay in touch with family and friends via videotelephony, and e-commerce in Sweden increased. The Swedish Internet Foundation's survey Svenskarna och internet (The Swedes and the internet) showed that older residents in particular used the internet to a greater extent during the pandemic.

In 2020, Swedish regulators banned the use of networking equipment from Huawei and ZTE, including their 5G networks.

== Mobile data connection ==
In 1981, the Nordic Mobile Telephone (NMT) system became available. The system makes NMT DATA available, making it possible to establish mobile computer communication with special modems at a speed of 1200 bit/s. The connection was charged with expensive per-minute call rates. The NMT network was shut down on 31 December 2007, but the frequencies and the NMT name were taken over by the American 3G system CDMA2000 and the operator Net 1 with a license from the Swedish Post and Telecom Authority expiring in 2015. In 1992, the GSM mobile phone network became available with the possibility of data communication at a data rate of 9600 bit/s charged at an expensive call rate per minute.

In 2000, the 2G mobile phone network GSM was equipped with packet switching (GPRS, sometimes called 2.5G) which allows single data bits to be transmitted, with charging per data bit instead of per connection and its duration. The high per-MB pricing made the option only economically feasible for high value per data bit applications. In 2003, 3G mobile phone networks using W-CDMA technology were launched, making efficient, and therefore cheap, mobile connectivity possible. A few years later, in 2006, HSDPA was also launched with a speed of 7.2 Mbit/s.

In 2007, one of the W-CDMA operators offered 0.384 Mbit/s for SEK 99/month, which included 1 GB of data transfer each month. More data transfer cost SEK 1.49/MB, with a price ceiling of SEK 399/month. In 2009, Stockholm and Oslo became the first cities in the world to offer 4G mobile LTE, initially at speeds of 50 and 100 Mbit/s respectively.

== See also ==
- History of the Internet
- Bulletin board system (BBS)
- Internetmuseum
- Amateur radio
- History of radio
- Internet in Sweden
