= Internet in Sweden =

.se Sweden's top level domain

Sweden's internet usage in 2022 was 96%, higher than the European Union (EU) average of 89%. This contributes to Sweden's digital skills development, with 67% of Swedes possessing basic digital skills, compared to the EU's 54%. Additionally, 36% of Swedes have above-basic digital skills and 77% have basic digital content creation skills, exceeding the EU averages of 26% and 66%, respectively. Codeweek 2022 in Sweden also demonstrated gender inclusivity, with a female participation rate of 51%.

In the Digital Economy and Society Index (DESI) 2022 report, Sweden is ranked 4th overall among 27 EU countries for its overall digital performance. Specifically, it is ranked 4th in Human Capital, demonstrating a higher level of digital skills and Information and Communication Technology (ICT) specialists than the EU average. In the Connectivity category, Sweden is 9th, with strong broadband coverage but with a slower 5G deployment compared to the EU average. The country ranks 3rd in the Integration of Digital Technology, showing strengths in digital integration and cloud service use among Small and Medium-sized Enterprises (SMEs). Finally, in Digital Public Services, Sweden is ranked 9th, reflecting a widespread adoption of e-government services.

== User statistics ==
- Top-level domain: .se
  - .nu (intended for Niue) also widely used in Sweden
- Internet hosts:
  - 6.0 million hosts, 19th in the world (2012);
  - 5.6 million hosts (2010).
- Internet users: 8.7 million users, 44th in the world; 94.0% of the population, 4th in the world (2012).
- Fixed broadband: 2.9 million subscriptions, 30th in the world; 32.2% of population, 18th in the world (2012).
- Wireless broadband: 9.2 million subscriptions, 26th in the world; 101.3% of the population, 5th in the world (2012).
- IPv4: 30.4 million addresses allocated, 0.7% of the world total, 3336.4 addresses per 1000 people (2012).
- Internet service providers (ISPs): 673 (2015).

== Broadband ==
=== Fixed broadband ===
In 2021, Sweden's fixed broadband landscape presents a mix of advances and challenges compared to the EU average. While overall broadband take-up saw a slight decline from 84% to 82% year over year, it still remains above the EU average of 78%. However, Sweden's uptake of 100 Mbps connections increased to 71%, significantly higher than the EU's 41%. In coverage, Sweden's Very High Capacity Network (VHCN) and Fibre to the Premises (FTTP) at 83% and 82% respectively, both exceed the EU averages of 70% and 50%. Despite these achievements, the broadband price index indicates a rise in costs.

=== Mobile broadband ===
In 2021, the country achieved a 95% mobile broadband take-up among individuals, surpassing the EU average of 87%. However, in terms of 5G coverage, Sweden covered only 18% of populated areas, notably below the EU's 66%. With 81% of the harmonized 5G spectrum assigned, Sweden exceeded the EU average of 56%. The year also saw a significant increase in mobile data traffic and a rapid uptake of 5G subscriptions, particularly pronounced in rural areas and for secondary homes.

== Digital public services ==
Digital public services are widely accessible in Sweden, earning it a notable 9th-place ranking among 27 EU countries. The country stands out with 93% of internet users engaging with e-government services, exceeding the EU average of 65%. Sweden also demonstrates proficiency in providing digital public services for both citizens and businesses, achieving scores of 85 and 88 out of 100, respectively, outperforming the EU averages of 75 and 82.

The country's decentralized approach to digitalization allows flexibility for public administration. However, coordination challenges exist, particularly in data interoperability. To address these challenges, the Swedish Agency for Digital Government (DIGG) had oversight over a EUR 0.5 million project aimed at enhancing artificial intelligence (AI) utilization across key agencies. This initiative aligns with ongoing efforts to establish a national digital public sector infrastructure.

== Internet censorship and surveillance ==
In 2009 the OpenNet Initiative (ONI) found little or no evidence of filtering in the four areas (politics, social, conflict/security, and Internet tools) for which they test. There is no individual ONI country profile for Sweden, but it is included in the regional overview for the Nordic countries.

There are no government restrictions on access to the Internet or credible reports that the government monitors e-mail or Internet chat rooms without appropriate legal authority. Individuals and groups engage in expression of views via the Internet, including by e-mail. You can check the availability of a website in Sweden using special services.

The constitution provides for freedom of speech and the press, and the government generally respects these rights in practice. An independent press, an effective judiciary, and a functioning democratic political system combine to ensure freedom of speech and of the press. The law criminalizes expression considered to be hate speech and prohibits threats or expressions of contempt for a group or member of a group based on race, color, national or ethnic origin, religious belief, or sexual orientation. Penalties for hate speech range from fines to a maximum of four years in prison.

The constitution and law prohibit arbitrary interference with privacy, family, home, or correspondence, and the government generally respects these prohibitions in practice. The law permits the signals intelligence agency, National Defense Radio Establishment, to monitor the content of all cross-border cable-based Internet traffic to combat "external threats" such as terrorism and organized crime. Monitoring is only possible after obtaining court permission and upon the explicit request of government or defense agencies. In 2012 parliament passed the EU Data Retention Directive that compels Internet service providers to store data on online communications within the country for six months so that law enforcement agencies have access to it if a court so orders.

Sweden's major Internet service providers have a DNS filter which blocks access to sites authorities claim are known to provide child pornography, similar to Denmark's filter. A partial sample of the block list can be seen at a Finnish site criticizing internet censorship. The Swedish police are responsible for updating this list of blocked sites. On 6 July 2007, Swedish police said that there is material with child pornography available on torrents linked from the torrent tracker site The Pirate Bay (TPB) and said would be included in the list of blocked Internet sites. This, however, did not happen as the police later claimed the illegal material had been removed from the site. Police never specified what the illegal content was on TPB. This came with criticism and accusations that the intended censorship of TPB was political in nature.

On 9 December 2014 TPB was raided at the Nacka station, a nuclear-proof data center built into a mountain complex near Stockholm. Despite the rise of various TPB clones and rumors of reincarnations, thepiratebay.se domain remained inaccessible. On 13 December 2014 Isohunt created a site called The Old Pirate Bay, which appears to be a resurrection of TPB. On 21 December 2014 after nearly two weeks of downtime the official domain of TPB showed signs of life. ThePirateBay.se was only waving a pirate flag, but that's enough to give many TPB users hope for a full recovery. TPB's main domain started pointing to a new IP-address connected to a server hosted in Moldova.

== See also ==
- History of the Internet in Sweden
- Television licensing in Sweden
- Telecommunications in Sweden
- Media of Sweden
- Minecraft
- PewDiePie
