= Anne-Marie Eklund Löwinder =

Swedish Internet expert

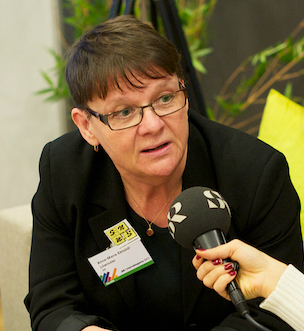
Anne-Marie Eklund Löwinder in 2011

Monika Ann-Mari (Anne-Marie) Eklund Löwinder (Amel), born 26 September 1957 in Stockholm, is a Swedish Internet expert.

== Biography ==
She is the Chief Information Security Officer at IIS, The Internet Foundation in Sweden. She also serves on the boards of internet-related organisations including the Council of European National Top Level Domain Registries (CENTR) and the Swedish Law and Informatics Research Institute.

Eklund Löwinder has been appointed Trusted Community Representative by the Internet Corporation for Assigned Names and Numbers (ICANN). She was one of seven people who controlled the DNSSEC key generation for the internet root zone until 2022, when she was succeeded by Pia Gruvö.

In 2013, Eklund Löwinder was the first Swede to be included in the Internet Hall of Fame. Interviewed in 2014, she said "I have to admit I love the internet. It's a piece of engineering art you have to admire. And to be able to contribute to make this a safer place makes me feel good." Along with Leif Johansson and Peter Löthberg, she was also part of the TU-stiftelsen foundation, which runs the Netnod.

Eklund Löwinder holds a candidate in computer science from Stockholm University.
