= IRI =

IRI or I.R.I. refers to:

== Businesses and organizations ==
=== Companies ===
- Innovative Routines International, Inc., an American software company specializing in data sorting, transformation, reporting, and privacy protection
- International Registries, Inc., a company that arranges tax and banking registration for the Marshall Islands
- IRI (company) (formerly SymphonyIRI Group), a market research company
- Italian Rotors Industries, a defunct Italian helicopter manufacturer

=== Other organizations ===
- Iringa Airport, an airport in Tanzania serving Iringa and the surrounding Iringa Region by IATA airport code
- India Rejuvenation Initiative, an Indian anti-corruption organization formed by top bureaucrats and other dignitaries
- Industrial Research Institute, a nonprofit association for the sharing of best practices in research and development
- Institut de Recherche et d'Innovation, a French research institute, founded by Centre Pompidou and now operated independently
- Institutet för rättsinformatik (Law and Informatics Research Institute), a Swedish research body examining relationships between law and IT
- Intellectual Reserve, Inc., a legal entity of The Church of Jesus Christ of Latter-day Saints
- International Republican Institute, a U.S. federal government-funded institution involved in supporting national political parties around the world
- International Research Institute for Climate and Society, a research unit of The Earth Institute
- International Resistance Initiative, a group claiming responsibility for two acts of sabotage in Québec
- Islamic Reporting Initiative, an independent nonprofit organization leading the creation of a sustainability reporting standard based on Islamic principles and values.
- Islamic Resistance in Iraq, a group of Iranian-backed Shia Islamists in Iraq.
- Istituto per la Ricostruzione Industriale (Institute for Industrial Reconstruction), a former Italian industrial public group

== Science and technology ==
- Indiana Robotics Invitational, the largest off-season FIRST robotics competition
- International Reference Ionosphere, the international standard for modelling the Earth's ionosphere
- International Roughness Index, a dimensionless quantity used for measuring road roughness
- Internationalized Resource Identifier, a generalization of the Uniform Resource Identifier (URI) allowing the use of Unicode
- Interpersonal Reactivity Index, a measurement tool (questionnaire) with a multidimensional approach to empathy assessment

=== Health care ===
- Ischemia-reperfusion injury, another name for reperfusion injury
- Irinotecan, a drug in chemotherapy for cancer

== Places ==
- Islamic Republic of Iran, the official name of Iran since 1979
- Iri-ye Olya, a village in East Azerbaijan Province, Iran
- Iri-ye Sofla, a village in East Azerbaijan Province, Iran
- Former name of the city center and railway junction in Iksan, South Korea

== People ==
- iri (artist), Japanese singer/songwriter
