= List of awards and nominations received by Basshunter =

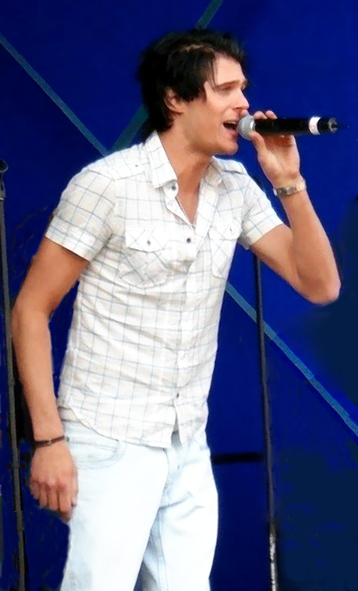
- Basshunter during the concert in Halmstad, 20 April 2008
Awards and nominations
Award	Wins	Nominations
BT Digital Music Award	0	2
Emma	0	2
Eska Music Award	1	1
Eurodanceweb Award	1	1
European Border Breakers Award	1	1
Gaygalan Award	0	1
Grammis	0	2
International Dance Music Award	1	1
MTV Europe Music Award	0	2
Musikförläggarnas pris	1	2
NRJ Radio Award	1	1
P3 Guld	0	1
The Record of the Year	0	1
Regeringens Musikexportpris	0	1
Rockbjörnen	0	2
Russ.no	1	1
Scandipop Award	1	2
Telia	1	1
World Music Award	1	1

Totals (Note: Certain award groups do not simply award one winner. They acknowledge several different recipients, have runners-up, and have third place. Since this is a specific recognition and is different from losing an award, runner-up mentions are considered wins in this award tally. For simplification and to avoid errors, each award in this list has been presumed to have had a prior nomination.)
- Wins: 9
- Nominations: 27

Basshunter is a Swedish singer, record producer and DJ who has released six studio albums. Overall, Basshunter has received nine awards from 27 nominations. His second studio album LOL (2006) earned him nominations for Emma and Grammis awards, and won the European Border Breakers Award. His single "Boten Anna" was nominated for several awards, including the Rockbjörnen award, and won the Eurodanceweb Award. "Now You're Gone" was nominated for the MTV Europe Music Award in the category Most Addictive Track, won the Eska Music Award and voted 9th place for The Record of the Year competition. In 2008, Basshunter was nominated for the BT Digital Music Award in the categories Best Electronic Artist or DJ and Breakthrough Artist of the Year. In 2009, Basshunter received the Scandipop Award. His single "Every Morning" was nominated for International Dance Music Award in 2010. In 2011, he also received last nomination for Scandipop Award for his single "Saturday". Basshunter has won no awards since 2009.

== Awards and nominations ==
Name of the award, year, nominee/work of the award, award category, and the result of the nomination
Award	Year	Nominee/Work	Category	Result	Ref.
BT Digital Music Award	2008	Basshunter	Best Electronic Artist or DJ	Nominated	
BT Digital Music Award	2008	Basshunter	Breakthrough Artist of the Year	Nominated	
Emma	2006	LOL	e-Emma of the Year	Nominated	
Emma	2006	Basshunter	Foreign Artist of the Year	Nominated	
Eska Music Award	2008	"Now You're Gone"	Radioactive Hit of the Year Era	Won	
Eurodanceweb Award	2006	"Boten Anna"	Best Dance Track of the Year	Won	
European Border Breakers Award	2008	LOL	None	Won	
Gaygalan Award	2007	"Boten Anna"	Swedish Song of the Year	Nominated	
Grammis	2007	LOL	Club/Dance Album of the Year	Nominated	
Grammis	2007	LOL	Newcomer of the Year	Nominated	
International Dance Music Award	2010	"Every Morning"	Best HiNRG/Euro Track	Nominated	
MTV Europe Music Award	2008	Basshunter	Best New Act	Nominated	
MTV Europe Music Award	2008	"Now You're Gone"	Most Addictive Track	Nominated	
Musikförläggarnas pris	2006	Basshunter	Newcomer of the Year	Won	
Musikförläggarnas pris	2008	Basshunter	International Success of the Year	Nominated	
NRJ Radio Award	2007	Basshunter	Best Dance Artist of the Year	Won	
P3 Guld	2007	"Boten Anna"	Song of the Year	Nominated	
The Record of the Year	2008	"Now You're Gone"	None	9th place	
Regeringens Musikexportpris	2008	Basshunter	None	Nominated	
Rockbjörnen	2006	"Boten Anna"	Swedish Song of the Year	Nominated	
Rockbjörnen	2006	Basshunter	Swedish Newcomer of the Year	Nominated	
Russ.no	2006	"Boten Anna"	Russ Song of the Year	Won	
Scandipop Award	2009	Basshunter	Best Male	Won	
Scandipop Award	2011	"Saturday"	Best Male Single	Nominated	
Telia	2007	"Boten Anna"	Best Ringtone of the Year	Won	
World Music Award	2008	Basshunter	World's Best Selling Swedish Artist	Won	

== Listicles ==
Name of publisher, year listed, nominee/work of the listicle, name of listicle and placement result
Publisher	Year	Nominee/Work	Listicle	Result	Ref.
BuzzFeed	2013	Basshunter	30 Reasons Sweden Is the Greatest Place for Music on Earth	15th place	
TheDailyEdge.ie	2016	"Now You're Gone"	Every Single Irish Number One in the 2000s, Ranked from Worst to Best	162nd place	
TheDailyEdge.ie	2016	"All I Ever Wanted"	Every Single Irish Number One in the 2000s, Ranked from Worst to Best	163rd place	
GamesRadar+	2015	"Vi sitter i Ventrilo och spelar DotA"	The Best, Worst and Most Bizarre Real-World Songs Inspired by Games	Placed	
Mirror	2009	"Jingle Bells"	Top 10 Worst Ever Christmas Singles	Placed	
MeaWW	2019	"Jingle Bells"	Top 10 Underrated Must-Hear Christmas Songs to Listen to This Holiday Season	8th place	
Metro	2016	"Jingle Bells"	15 Christmas Hits You've Probably Forgotten About	Placed	
Monstercat	2017	"Vi sitter i Ventrilo och spelar DotA"	Monstercat's 50 Best Gaming Songs Ever	Placed	
MusicRadar	2014	"Jingle Bells"	14 of the Worst Christmas Songs	Placed	
Popkultur.de	2021	Basshunter	The 25 Most Successful Swedish Singers	23rd place	
Radio X	2017	"Jingle Bells"	10 Genuinely Terrible Christmas Songs	4th place	
Radio X	2022	"Jingle Bells"	The 20 Worst Christmas Songs	13th place	
Ranker	2019	"Jingle Bells"	The Absolute Worst Christmas Songs of All Time	43rd place	
Skiddle	2022	"Jingle Bells"	The Worst Christmas Song of All Time	Placed	
Smooth Radio	2021	"Jingle Bells"	The 20 Worst Christmas Songs of All Time	3rd place	
Vice	2020	"Now You're Gone"	The Top 50 Greatest High Street Club Bangers of All Time	39th place	
The Village Voice	2009	"Please Don't Go"	The 50 Worst Songs of the '00s	43rd place	
