= Girone =

Girone is a surname of Italian origin. Notable people with the surname include:

- Maria Girone, Italian physicist
- Remo Girone (1948–2025), Italian film and stage actor
- Rose Girone (1912–2025), Polish Holocaust survivor and American businesswoman
