= Playahead =

Playahead was a large Internet community mainly aimed at Swedish teenagers. The site was founded 1998 and became one of the largest Internet communities in Sweden. At its height of popularity, Playahead was, together with LunarStorm and Hamsterpaj, the most popular social networks amongst Swedish teenagers. The site was shut down on March 1, 2010.

== About ==
Playahead was a site much alike LunarStorm. It was a place for teenagers to meet, talk, write to each other, look at each other's pictures and debate in forums. Members could also pay a small fee of "Playahead-Dollars" to create a team, based on their interest, and then other members could join the team. Most of the members were between 15 and 24 years old.(There was a 15 year age restriction.)

== History ==
The site was founded by Jonas Frost, Magnus Hansson and Henrik Weimenhög, and was from the beginning named "Hångelguiden" (translates to The Make Out Guide). In 2000, the site was sold to a company based in Helsingborg, named Playahead. It claimed to have 2.9 million members, making an average of around 5,9 million logins per month. After 2007 the site had not done so well and had only 600,000 visitors a week. It was sold once again to the company Modern Times Group. As of May 2009 the site had an Alexa rank of around 29,000. The Site closed on March 1, 2010.

== See also ==
- Bilddagboken
- LunarStorm
