= Moe (singer) =

Swedish singer

Mohammed Alazzawie, ("Moe") (born 29 November 1984) is a Swedish singer.

Moe charted hits with the songs "Backstabber", "Side by Side" and "Stop", from his album My World released in 2002. He was one of Sweden's first social media launched singer, launching his career on Lunarstorm.

== Discography ==
=== Singles ===
Title	Year	Peak chart positions	Album
Title	Year	SWE	Album
"Side by Side"	2002	14	Non-album single
