= Passagen =

Passagen may refer to

- Passagen (web portal)
- Passagen Verlag, a German publisher
