= Skunk (community) =

Swedish social networking website

Skunk was a Swedish social networking community website founded in 1998. It was one of the pioneers in the field, and the largest community website in Sweden in 2000, mostly popular with teenagers. It was subsequently overtaken by competitors such as Lunarstorm and Playahead. Skunk became part of Spray Network.

In June 2010 Spray Network announced that they had decided to shut down the site and it closed on 30 June 2010.
