= Kees Neggers =

Dutch Internet pioneer (born 1947)

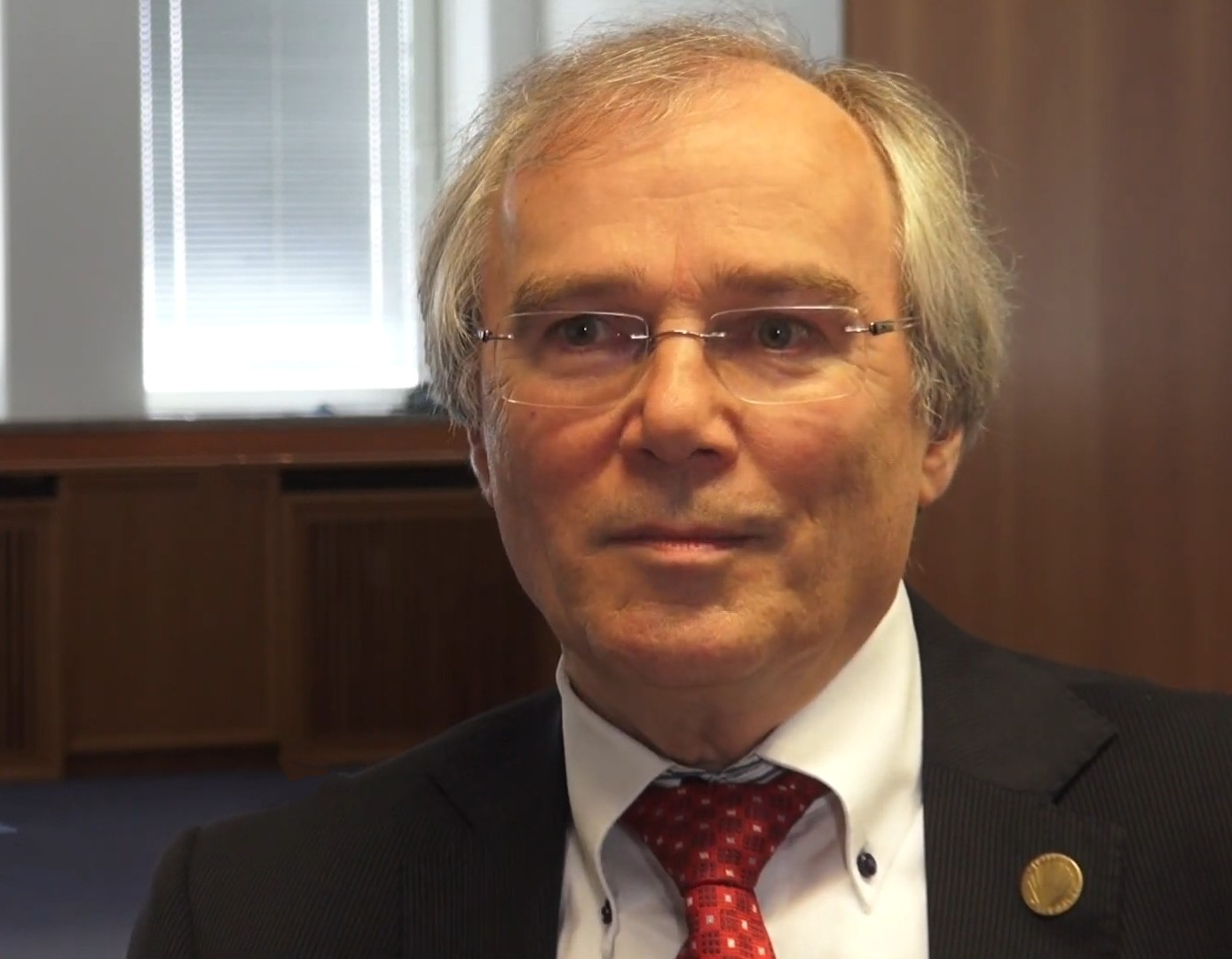
- Kees Neggers in 2013
- Born: Cornelis Adrianus Maria Neggers; 20 July 1947 (age 79); Breda, Netherlands
- Education: Eindhoven University of Technology
- Awards: Dutch ICT Personality of the Year (2002); Officer of the Order of Orange-Nassau (2012); Inductee Internet Hall of Fame (2013)
- Scientific career
- Workplaces: University of Groningen; Catholic University of Nijmegen; SURFnet BV

Cornelis Adrianus Maria "Kees" Neggers (born 20 July 1947) is a Dutch Internet pioneer. He is best known for starting and promoting many initiatives for international collaboration in research and education networking.

== Education and early career ==
Neggers was born in Breda, the Netherlands on 20 July 1947. He studied electrical engineering at Eindhoven University of Technology, where he obtained his M.Eng. in 1972. He started his career as a staff member of the permanent committee advising the Dutch Ministry of Education and Sciences on computing infrastructure. He worked at the Computing Centre of the University of Groningen from 1975 until 1984. In 1984, Neggers joined the Computing Centre at the Catholic University of Nijmegen as deputy director. The same year he started his career in international networking by becoming the director of the European Academic and Research Network (EARN) for the Netherlands.

== SURFnet and international activities ==
In 1984–1985, Boudewijn Nederkoorn, Director of the Computing Centre at the Catholic University of Nijmegen, and Kees Neggers were among a few dozen members of the academic and ICT community in the Netherlands preparing a multi-annual plan for computer services by scientific education and research. This led to the creation of the SURF Foundation in May 1987 and the incorporation of the company SURFnet BV in January 1989. A year earlier, on 1 January 1988, Nederkoorn and Neggers were appointed co-directors of SURFnet.

On 13 June 1986, Neggers was present when Réseaux Associés pour la Recherche Européenne (RARE), the European association of national research and education networks, was incorporated in Amsterdam. He served as Treasurer of the association until 1990, as vice-president from 1990 until 1992, and as president from 1992 until the European Academic and Research Network (EARN) association was merged with RARE and RARE changed its name to TERENA on 20 October 1994. He joined the TERENA Executive Committee again as vice-president for Services from 1997 until 1999, and as Vice-president Technical Programme from 1999 until 2001.

In November 1987 Neggers participated in the first meeting of the Co-ordinating Committee for Intercontinental Research Networking (CCIRN), which was held in Washington, D.C. He was appointed by RARE as the European CCIRN co-chair in 1988 and continued in that position until the final full CCIRN meeting in Reykjavík in 2011.

In the 1980s the need to choose between the OSI protocols and the Internet Protocol (IP) became the subject of a long-lasting controversy, but by the early 1990s IP became the dominant protocol in data networking. In 1991, Neggers was one of the people leading the initiative to create a project called Ebone as an interim solution while the European research networking community made the transition from OSI to IP.

Neggers represented RARE as a Founding Member of the Internet Society when that organisation was founded in 1992. He served as a trustee of the Society appointed by RARE from 1992 until 1996, and as an elected member of the Board of Trustees from 1998 until 2004.

The Réseaux IP Européens Network Coordination Centre (RIPE NCC) was created by RARE in 1992. As TERENA's vice-president for Services, Neggers played a major role in splitting off the service and setting up the RIPE NCC as an independent association, incorporated in November 1997. He served as a TERENA-appointed member of the Board of the RIPE NCC in 1998–1999, and as Chair of the executive board from 2000 until 2008.

He took an active part in the creation of the Amsterdam Internet Exchange in 1994–1997, and of the Dutch chapter of the Internet Society in 1997.

Neggers was one of the organisers of first Annual Global LambdaGrid Workshop, which was held in Amsterdam on 11 September 2001. This series of annual events led by 2003 to the creation of the Global Lambda Integrated Facility (GLIF), an international virtual organisation that promotes the paradigm of lambda networking. Neggers chairs the Governance Working Group of GLIF. He was one of the initiators of the creation of NetherLight, the GLIF Open Lightpath Exchange (GOLE) in Amsterdam, and represented SURFnet in the GLORIAD initiative since its inception in 2003.

In July 2012, Neggers retired from his position at SURFnet, but continued as a strategic advisor to the SURF Foundation and as one of the Dutch representatives in the e-Infrastructure Reflection Group. In July 2014, Neggers took up the job as interim director of SURF. He retired in 2015.

== Awards ==
In 2002, Boudewijn Nederkoorn and Kees Neggers were jointly elected ICT Personality of the Year by the Dutch ICT-Office. On his retirement from SURFnet in 2012, Kees Neggers was appointed Officer of the Order of Orange-Nassau. He was inducted into the Internet Hall of Fame in August 2013.
