= François Flückiger =

Computer scientist

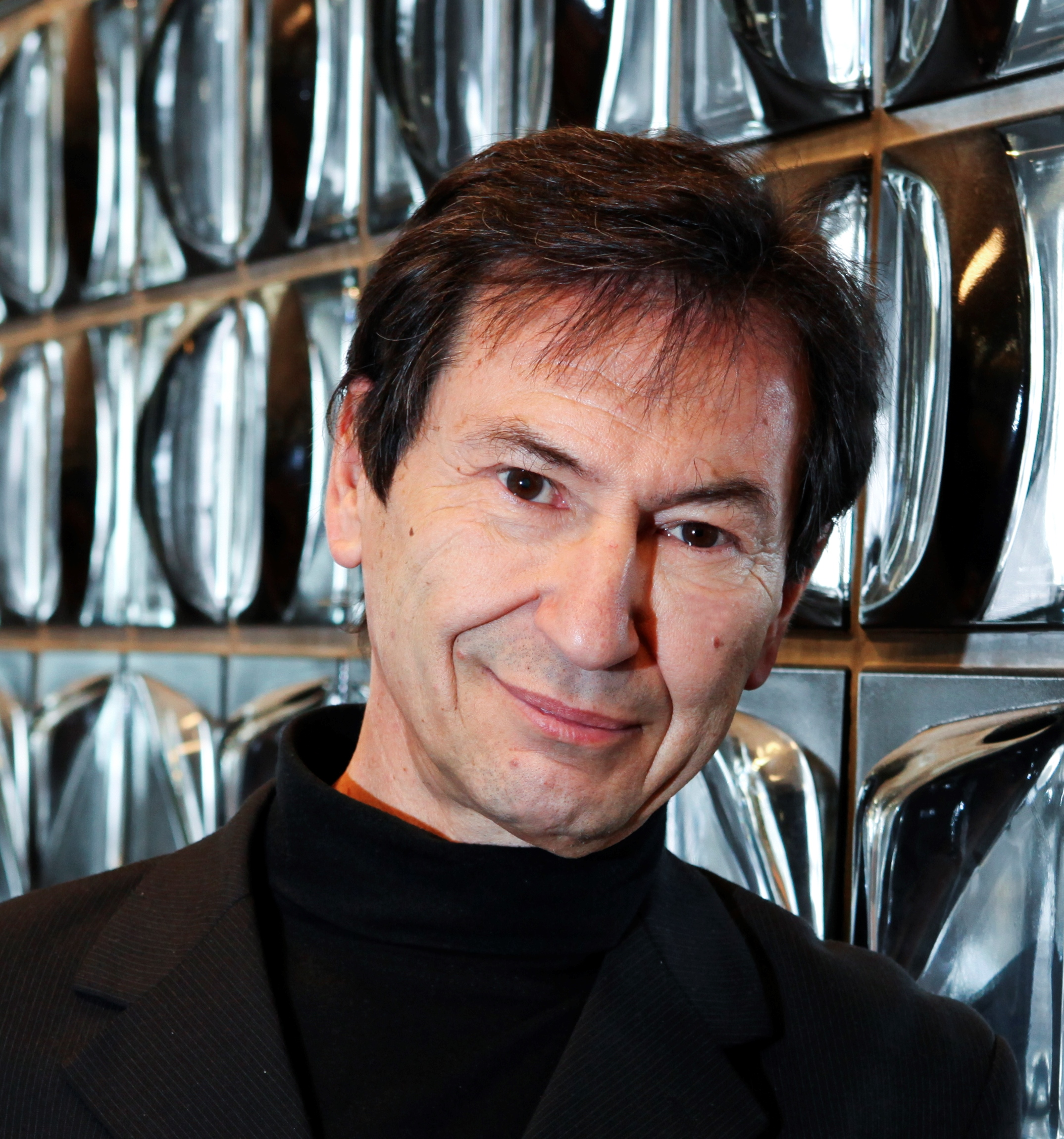
François Flückiger

François Flückiger is a French computer scientist who worked at CERN. He was selected for induction in 2013 in the Internet Hall of Fame.

== Internet contributions ==
Flückiger was in charge of the CERN external network. He contributed to the creation of CCIRN (Coordinating Committee for Intercontinental Research Network), RIPE (Réseaux IP Européens) and Ebone (European Backbone). Flückiger was inducted into the Internet Hall of Fame in August 2013 for his leadership in establishing the Internet in Europe.

After the departure of Tim Berners-Lee from CERN, François Flückiger took over him to lead the web development technical team at CERN. He chaired the Inet1988, Inet2001 and Inet2002 conference programme.

== Career ==
Between 2001 and 2011, he was a CERN openlab manager and until 2013 he held the position of the Director of the CERN School of Computing. He is Knowledge and Technology Transfer Officer for Information Technologies at CERN. He is a lecturer at the University of Geneva, a member of the Internet Society Advisory Council and of the W3C Advisory Committee.

== Education ==
Flückiger is a graduate of the École Supérieure d'Électricité (Supélec) and holds an MBA from the Institut d'Administration des Entreprises in Paris.

== Selected publications ==
- F.Fluckiger Understanding Networked Multimedia, Prentice Hall, 1995, ISBN 0-13-190992-4
- F.Fluckiger "The European Research Network", Translated from "Les Réseau des Chercheurs Européens ", La Rechecrhe, February 2000
- F.Fluckiger "CERN Celebrates Another Key Contribution to the Internet", CERN Computer Newsletter, June 29, 2009

== See also ==
- Protocol Wars
