= Vifta med händerna =

Single by Basshunter vs. Patrik & Lillen

from the album LOL <(^^,)>
- Released: 13 December 2006
- Genre: Hip-hop
- Length: 3:05 (Radio Edit)
- Label: Warner Music Sweden
- Songwriter: Basshunter (Note: According to ACE Repertory data "Vifta med händerna" was written by Basshunter, Patrik Lindberg (Patrik) and Emil Wahlström (Lillen).)
- Producer: Basshunter

Basshunter singles chronology
"Jingle Bells" (2006)	"Vifta med händerna" (2006)	"DotA" (2007)

Music video
- "Vifta med händerna" on YouTube

"Vifta med händerna" is a song by Swedish musicians Basshunter and Patrik & Lillen, released on 13 December 2006 by Warner Music Sweden. "Vifta med händerna" was released as "Throw Your Hands Up" on Basshunter's later release of 2006 second studio album, LOL. The single peaked at number 25 on Swedish singles chart.

== Background and production ==
Basshunter's previous single, "Jingle Bells", had been released two months earlier on 13 October 2006. "Vifta med händerna" is hip-hop song done in collaboration with the Örebro rap duo Patrik & Lillen. The song was written by Basshunter, Patrik Lindberg (Patrik), and Emil Wahlström (Lillen), and produced by Basshunter. "Vifta med händerna" was mastered by Björn Engelman of Cutting Room studio. Emil Wahlström asked on LunarStorm if there was anyone who was good at remixes and he received information about Basshunter, and after they started working together. With this song, they went on tour in Sweden for six months and Wahlström signed with label Warner Music Sweden.

The song was released as "Throw Your Hands Up" on the later 2006 release of LOL album. A music video was produced to promote the single. Basshunter's next single was released on 5 October 2007 – a new version of "Vi sitter i Ventrilo och spelar DotA" released under the name "DotA". Original "Vifta med händerna" by Patrik also was released on his single "Allt vi har haft".

== Reception ==
Professional ratings
Review scores
Source	Rating
Findance.com	7/10 stars

Antti Niemelä of Findance.com described Patrik & Lillen's rapping as fast and mentioned that the combination of Swedish-language rap and dance music reminded him of the Swedish group Oktan. Niemelä added that the rapping was good but needed a better musical background.

== Chart performance ==
"Vifta med händerna" entered the Swedish singles chart at its peak of number 25 on 30 November 2006, before it was released as a single. It stayed on the chart for ten weeks. In the third week of 2007, "Vifta med händerna" debuted on the Finnish singles chart and stayed at number seven for two weeks before exiting the chart.

== Track listing ==
CD single (13 December 2006), digital download (24 December 2006), streaming
No.	Title	Writer(s)	Producer(s)	Length
1.	"Vifta med händerna" (Radio Edit (Note: Credited as "Basshunter Remix" in digital release.))	Jonas Altberg	Altberg	3:05
2.	"Vifta med händerna" (Club Edit (Note: Credited as "Short Basshunter Remix" in digital release.))	Altberg	Altberg	4:12
Total length:				7:17

== Personnel ==
Credits

- Vocal – Basshunter, Patrik Lindberg and Emil Wahlström (uncredited)
- Writer – Basshunter
- Producer – Basshunter
- Mastering – Björn Engelman

== Charts ==
Weekly chart performance for "Vifta med händerna"
Chart (2006)	Peak position
Sweden (Sverigetopplistan)	25
Chart (2007)	Peak position
Finland (Suomen virallinen lista)	7

== Release history ==
Release dates and formats for "Vifta med händerna"
Country	Date	Version	Format	Label	Ref.
Various	13 December 2006	Single	CD single	Warner Music Sweden	
Various	24 December 2006	Single	Digital download, streaming	Warner Music Sweden	
