= EBONE =

Pan-European Internet backbone

EBONE Logo

EBONE (standing for European Backbone) was a pan-European Internet backbone. It went online in 1992 and was deactivated in July 2002. Some portions of the Ebone were sold to other companies and continue to operate today.

== History ==
=== Formation ===
In 1991 a certain number of research network managers, including Frode Greisen, from Denmark, Kees Neggers, director of the Dutch network SURFNet, and Francois Fluckiger at CERN sought to create a European Internet backbone open to publicly-financed academic networks and private commercial networks. The Ebone consortium was established at the RIPE meeting in Geneva in September 1991, and the network went online in 1992 after the initial IP backbone with 256 kbps links was completed. Frode Greisen became the general manager while Peter Löthberg served as de facto architect.

=== Operation ===
In 1996 the consortium was transformed into the Ebone Association which again established a private limited company Ebone Inc. based in Denmark. In 1998 the Ebone Association sold 75% of the company to Hermes Europe Railtel, and in 1999 the remaining 25% was bought by Global Telesystems Group Inc. (GTS) which had then acquired Hermes Europe Railtel.

The Ebone backbone increased by a factor of 40,000 in speed over nine years from 256 kbit/s to 10 Gbit/s and the traffic roughly followed, see table below:

year	backbone/(Mbit/s)	total access/(Mbit/s)
1992	0.256	4
1993	0.5	6
1994	2	8
1995	2	16
1996	34	36
1997	34	68
1998	155	112
1999	2488	235
2000	2488	1145
2001	9952	1919

In year 2000 Ebone provided international transit for around 100 Internet Service Providers based in most of the European countries.

In 2001 GTS re-branded all its data communications products as Ebone and Ebone was one of Europe's leading broadband optical and IP network service providers.

=== Shutdown ===
In October 2001, KPNQwest acquired Ebone and the Central Europe businesses of GTS and completed their EuroRings network.

Following the Dot com crash and various investigations, KPNQwest declared bankruptcy. In June 2002, it was announced that the Ebone Network Operations Center would be shut down, and the Ebone would be deactivated.

Employees in the Ebone Network Operations Center and elsewhere attempted to keep the network running for many weeks after the last possible sale of the company fell through, but eventually were told to shut down the network and abandon the building, which they did on July 2, 2002.

=== Emails ===
  TO:            xxx
  CUSTOMER CONTACT: XXX
  FROM:          customer at ebone.com
  DATE:          06/JUN/2002 19:12:17
  ATTN:          XXX
  
  KPNQWEST TT NUMBER: 179256
  KPNQWEST CONTACT: Iain Tweedie-Walker
  CSC PHONE NUMBER: Any Queries please contact theCSC.
  
  
  BROADCAST MESSAGE
  
  Hoeilaart 6 June 2002 / Message to all Ebone customers / The
  Administrators have not found any additional funding to continue Ebone
  operators and have asked personnel
  to evacuate the building and close down the network. Ebone employees
  have refused to do so and are motivated to keep the network up and
  running as long as possible.
  Ebone employees have requested the Belgian Government to help out
  finding a solution for the immediate future.

  TO:            xxx
  CUSTOMER CONTACT: XXX
  FROM:          customer at ebone.com
  DATE:          02/JUL/2002 08:44:48
  ATTN:          XXX
  
  KPNQWEST TT NUMBER: 180969
  KPNQWEST CONTACT: Iain Tweedie-Walker
  CSC PHONE NUMBER: Any Queries please contact theCSC.
  
  
  BROADCAST MESSAGE
  
  To all our customers despite the Efforts of the 40 people at Ebone NOC
  these last few months to keep the network up and running our efforts
  have been in vain, as finally
  the banks and other parties concerned have stopped the proposed sale
  of Ebone happening.As a result of this we have now been ordered by the
  curators to shut down the Network.this will happen today 2 July 1,
  2002 at 11:00AM CET.
  I wish to thank our entire customers for their support over these last
  few months and only wish that things could have turned out
  differently.

=== Acquisition of assets ===
Two weeks after the 03 July 2002 message to the operating team at Ebone, the company's physical assets were sold to Interoute Communications, Ltd., for €15 million, or 100% of the purchase price KPNQwest had paid to acquire the asset five months prior. The Ebone asset provided critical Metropolitan Area Networks (MANs) to the Interoute infrastructure.

== See also ==
- EuropaNet
- European Academic and Research Network (EARN)
- Protocol Wars
- RARE
