= Internetmuseum =

Swedish digital museum

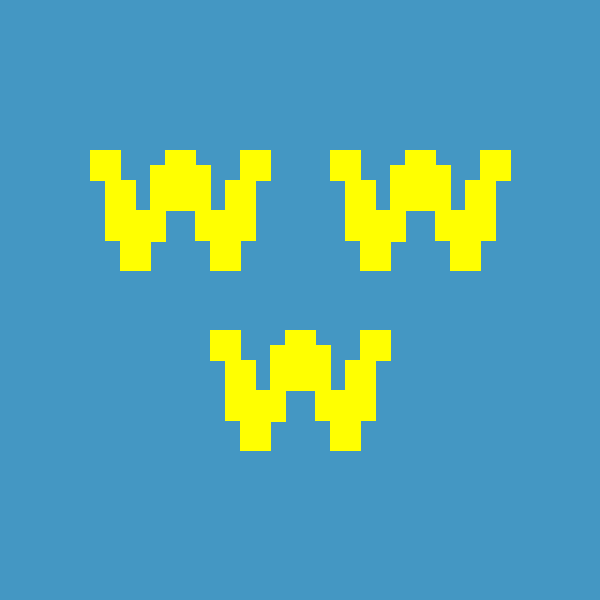
- Logo
- Established: 2014
- Type: Digital technology museum
- Director: Elisabeth Standár
- Website: www.internetmuseum.se

Internetmuseum is a Swedish digital museum opened in 2014. In June 2016 Internetmuseum was inducted to The Association of Swedish Museums (Riksförbundet Sveriges museer) as the first entirely digital museum.

Internetmuseum is run by the independent organization The Internet Foundation in Sweden (Internetstiftelsen i Sverige) and features a mix of technology, politics, and internet culture. The ambition of the museum is to spread knowledge of the Swedish history of Internet and to preserve the digital heritage.

The museum retains websites of certain historical interest such as all websites from Sweden's first commercial ISP Swipnet.
