= Hallå där =

Song by Basshunter

from the album LOL <(^^,)>
- Released: 2006
- Genre: Eurodance
- Label: Warner Music Sweden
- Songwriter: Basshunter
- Producer: Basshunter

LOL chronology
"Sverige"	"Hallå där"	"Mellan oss två"

Audio video
- "Hallå där" on YouTube

"Hallå där" is a song by Swedish eurodance musician Basshunter, which was released in 2006. The song peaked at number 51 on the Swedish singles chart. It appeared on his debut album LOL <(^^,)>. When the red cover version of the album was released, the song was translated into English as "Hello There". In 2007 the song was released on various artists compilation album Tanzpalast Dance Compilation - Final Edition. In 2015 "Hallå där" was uploaded by Basshunter to his YouTube channel.

== Charts ==
Chart (2006)	Peak position
Sweden (Sverigetopplistan)	51
