= LOL (Basshunter album) =

Studio album by Basshunter
- Released: 28 August 2006
- Recorded: 2005–2006
- Studio: Basshunter Studio; PJ Harmony Studio
- Genre: Eurodance
- Length: 54:25
- Label: Warner Music Sweden; Ultra Records

Basshunter chronology
| The Bassmachine (2004) | LOL (2006) | The Old Shit (2006) |

Singles from LOL
- 1. "Boten Anna" Released: 9 May 2006; 2. "Vi sitter i Ventrilo och spelar DotA" Released: 13 September 2006; 3. "Jingle Bells" Released: 13 November 2006; 4. "Vifta med händerna" Released: 13 December 2006

LOL (stylised LOL <(^^,)>; LOL is short for "laughing out loud", and <(^^,)> is an emoticon for "satisfied") is the second studio album by the Swedish musician Basshunter, and was released on 28 August 2006 by Warner Music Sweden. An international edition was released on 22 December 2006, with a red version of the cover artwork. The international version includes the original album's Swedish songs (with the exception of "Sverige") with their titles translated into English, a slightly-different track order and additional tracks, including "Jingle Bells".

== Background ==
On 21 November 2005, Basshunter announced that he was working on a new album and had completed ten songs. He announced his upcoming single "Welcome to Rainbow" the following month, and it was released on 1 April 2006. The single included the hardstyle remix and two bonus tracks: "Evil Beat" and "Boten Anna". Basshunter re-recorded "Boten Anna" in March, and posted it on his website for download. He signed with Extensive Music in April, and Warner Music Sweden and "Boten Anna" was released on 9 May.

Basshunter worked on LOL for three and a half weeks. The album was recorded at Basshunter Studio and PJ Harmony Studio. Basshunter produced most of the songs; three were produced by PJ Harmony. Vocals were recorded by Basshunter and Robert Uhlmann at Basshunter Studio and Extensive Studio. LOL was mastered by Björn Engelman at the Cutting Room. Ali Payami assisted Basshunter on three tracks. According to the singer, its songs have elements of hard dance and hard trance and he chose them for his old and new listeners. "Strand Tylösand" is inspired by party that Basshunter and its friends had in the summer of 2005.

Basshunter said that he had more songs and planned to release a continuation of LOL called ROFL or KTHXBYE for free but he couldn't do it due to the record label. In 2025, Basshunter revealed that he no longer has the project for "Strand Tylösand", so he had to use an artificial intelligence tool to remove the vocals, so he could get a decent instrumental version.

== Reception ==
Professional ratings
Review scores
| Source | Rating |
|---|---|
| AllMusic | 3.5/5 stars |
| Findance.com | 8/10 stars |
| musicserver.cz | 1/10 stars |

According to Matthew Chisling of AllMusic, LOL contains Basshunter's best "beats and grinds". Håkan Steen of Aftonbladet wrote that the album was for people who share Basshunter's lifestyle: using the social-media website LunarStorm and chatting and playing computer games online. Steen considered "Festfolk" the album's best song. Stefan Thungren of Svenska Dagbladet sensed an intentional inadequate execution in the material, and wrote that the sophisticated, difficult shout in "Festfolk" was inspired by the musician E-Type. Thungren compared "Strand Tylösand" to the band Gyllene Tider's summer hits, criticised the trance adaptation of the Swedish national anthem in "Sverige", and noted a certain melancholy in the instrumental version of "Boten Anna". Andreas Nordström from Expressen negatively described album as one of the most difficult records in the history. Basshunter found the Nordström review amusing. In 2020 "I'm Your Basscreator" was placed on list Italian Mob by Italian rap DJ's.

== Chart performance ==
LOL entered the Swedish albums chart at its peak position at number 5 on 7 September 2006. It stayed on the chart for eight weeks. Day later it debuted on Danish albums chart at number six and peaked two weeks later at number three. Album was there on the chart for 19 weeks. Album was certified double Platinum. LOL entered the Finnish albums chart at number 34 and 13 weeks later it peaked at number four for two weeks. LOL was certified Platinum and became fourth best selling foreign album of 2006 in Finland with 33,365 copies sold. Album stayed there for 24 weeks on the chart. In 2007 LOL debuted on Austrian albums chart and in 2008 it entered French albums chart and also charted at the United States Top Dance/Electronic Albums.

== Track listing ==
=== Original blue-cover album ===
LOL track listing
| No. | Title | Writer(s) | Producer(s) | Length |
|---|---|---|---|---|
| 1. | "Vi sitter i Ventrilo och spelar DotA" | David Le Roy; Jean Christophe Belval (Note: Basshunter wrote the Swedish lyrics.) | Jonas Altberg | 3:22 |
| 2. | "Boten Anna" | Altberg | Altberg | 3:29 |
| 3. | "Strand Tylösand" | Altberg | Altberg | 3:17 |
| 4. | "Sverige" | Altberg | Altberg | 2:58 |
| 5. | "Hallå där" | Altberg | Altberg | 2:38 |
| 6. | "Mellan oss två" | Altberg | Altberg | 3:58 |
| 7. | "Var är jag" | Altberg; PJ Harmony (Note: According to ACE Repertory data, "Var är jag" was written by Jonas Altberg and Ali Payami.) | Altberg; PJ Harmony (Note: According to ACE Repertory data, "Var är jag" was produced by Jonas Altberg and Ali Payami.) | 4:01 |
| 8. | "Utan stjärnorna" | Altberg; PJ Harmony (Note: According to ACE Repertory data, "Utan stjärnorna" was written by Jonas Altberg and Ali Payami.) | Altberg; PJ Harmony (Note: According to ACE Repertory data, "Utan stjärnorna" was produced by Jonas Altberg and Ali Payami.) | 3:51 |
| 9. | "Festfolk" (2006 remix) | Altberg; PJ Harmony (Note: According to ACE Repertory data, "Festfolk (2006 Remix)" was written by Jonas Altberg and Ali Payami.) | Altberg; PJ Harmony (Note: According to ACE Repertory data "Festfolk (2006 Remix)" was produced by Jonas Altberg and Ali Payami.) | 4:01 |
| 10. | "Vifta med händerna" (Basshunter Remix) (Patrik och Lillen) | Altberg (Note: According to ACE Repertory data, "Vifta med händerna" was written by Jonas Altberg, Patrik Lindberg and Emil Wahlström.) | Altberg | 3:11 |
| 11. | "Professional Party People" | Altberg | Altberg | 3:09 |
| 12. | "I'm Your Basscreator" | Altberg | Altberg | 5:25 |

LOL bonus tracks
| No. | Title | Writer(s) | Producer(s) | Length |
|---|---|---|---|---|
| 13. | "Boten Anna" (Instrumental) | Altberg | Altberg | 3:20 |
| 14. | "Vi sitter i Ventrilo och spelar DotA" (Extended Version) | David Le Roy; Jean Christophe Belval | Altberg | 7:45 |
| Total length: | | | | 54:25 |

=== Red-cover version ===
1. "Now You're Gone" (radio edit; US bonus track) – 2:39
2. "DotA" (radio edit) – 3:21
3. "Boten Anna" – 3:28
4. "I'm Your Bass Creator" – 5:24
5. "Russia Privjet" – 4:07
6. "Professional Party People" – 3:09
7. "GPS" – 4:00
8. "Hello There" – 2:40
9. "We Are the Waccos" – 3:58
10. "The Beat" – 3:35
11. "Without Stars" – 3:50
12. "Throw Your Hands Up" (Basshunter Remix; Patrik and the Small Guy) – 3:10
13. "Strand Tylösand" – 3:17
14. "Between the Two of Us" – 3:58
15. "Boten Anna" (instrumental) – 3:20
16. "DotA" (club mix) – 5:44
17. "Jingle Bells (Bass)" – 2:46
18. "Beer in the Bar" (US bonus track) – 3:51

=== Red-cover version (2008 Ultra Records rRelease) ===
1. "Now You're Gone" (radio edit) – 2:39
2. "DotA" (radio edit) – 3:21
3. "I'm Your Bass Creator" – 5:24
4. "Russia Privjet" – 4:07
5. "Professional Party People" – 3:09
6. "GPS" – 4:00
7. "Hello There" – 2:40
8. "We Are the Waccos" – 3:58
9. "The Beat" – 3:35
10. "Without Stars" – 3:50
11. "Throw Your Hands Up" (Basshunter Remix; Patrik and the Small Guy) – 3:10
12. "Strand Tylösand" – 3:17
13. "Between the Two of Us" – 3:58
14. "Boten Anna" (original version) – 3:27
15. "Now You're Gone" (Sound Selectaz Remix; bonus track) – 5:35
16. "DotA" (club mix; bonus track) – 5:44
17. "Jingle Bells" (bonus track) – 2:45

== Charts ==
=== Weekly charts ===
2006 weekly chart performance for LOL
| Chart (2006) | Peak position |
|---|---|
| Danish Albums (Hitlisten) | 3 |
| Dutch Albums (Album Top 100) | 66 |
| European Albums (Billboard) | 82 |
| Finnish Albums (Suomen virallinen lista) | 4 |
| Norwegian Albums (VG-lista) | 19 |
| Swedish Albums (Sverigetopplistan) | 5 |

2007 weekly chart performance for LOL
| Chart (2007) | Peak position |
|---|---|
| Austrian Albums (Ö3 Austria) | 12 |

2008 weekly chart performance for LOL
| Chart (2008) | Peak position |
|---|---|
| French Albums (SNEP) | 51 |
| US Top Dance/Electronic Albums (Billboard) | 24 |

=== Year-end charts ===
Yearly chart performance for LOL
| Chart (2006) | Position |
|---|---|
| Denmark (IFPI Danmark) | 26 |

== Certifications ==
Certifications and sales for LOL
| Region | Certification | Certified units/sales |
|---|---|---|
| Denmark (IFPI Danmark) | 2× Platinum | 40,000^{‡} |
| Finland (Musiikkituottajat) | Platinum | 33,365 |
^{‡} Sales+streaming figures based on certification alone.

== Awards ==
Awards for LOL
| Award | Year | Category | Result | Ref. |
|---|---|---|---|---|
| Emma | 2006 | e-Emma of the Year | Nominated | |
| European Border Breakers Award | 2008 | None | Won | |
| Grammis | 2007 | Club/Dance Album of the Year | Nominated | |
| Grammis | 2007 | Newcomer of the Year | Nominated | |
