= OpenDNSSEC =

Free and open source DNSSEC implementation

- Initial release: July 30, 2009; 16 years ago
- Stable release: 2.1.14 / August 22, 2024; 19 months ago
- Written in: C, C++
- Operating system: Linux, FreeBSD, NetBSD, Mac OS X, Solaris
- Type: DNSSEC
- License: BSD
- Website: www.opendnssec.org
- Repository: github.com/opendnssec/opendnssec

SoftHSM
- Stable release: 2.6.1 / April 29, 2020; 5 years ago
- Written in: C++
- Operating system: Linux, FreeBSD, NetBSD, Mac OS X
- License: BSD
- Website: www.opendnssec.org
- Repository: github.com/opendnssec/SoftHSMv2

OpenDNSSEC is a computer program that manages the security of domain names on the Internet. The project intends to drive adoption of Domain Name System Security Extensions (DNSSEC) to further enhance Internet security. End-of-Life was announced on 3 October 2025, introducing its successor, Cascade.

OpenDNSSEC was created as an open-source turn-key solution for DNSSEC. It secures DNS zone data just before it is published in an authoritative name server. OpenDNSSEC takes in unsigned zones, adds digital signatures and other records for DNSSEC and passes it on to the authoritative name servers for that zone. All keys are stored in a hardware security module and accessed via PKCS #11, a standard software interface for communicating with devices which hold cryptographic information and perform cryptographic functions. OpenDNSSEC can be paired with SoftHSM which provides a Software emulation of a hardware security module.

OpenDNSSEC runs two dedicated daemons these are ods-enforcerd which acts as an enforcer Engine Daemon with the role of enforcing the KASP (Key and Signing Policy), and the ods-signerd which carries out actual signing of the zone. A DNS zone will failed to be signed if either process fail.

The ods-enforcer client program may be used to interact with the enforcer Engine and can be used to initiate such actions as a key rollover manually.

OpenDNSSEC uses the Botan cryptographic library, and SQLite or MySQL as database back-end. It is used on the .fr,.se, .dk, .nl, .nz and .uk top-level domains.

== See also ==
- Domain Name System § Security issues
