= .nu =

Internet country code top-level domain for the island state of Niue

- Introduced: 20 June 1997
- TLD type: Country code top-level domain
- Status: Active
- Registry: The Internet Foundation in Sweden
- Sponsor: Internet Users Society - Niue
- Intended use: Entities connected with Niue
- Actual use: Used for a multitude of sites, few with any connection to Niue; especially popular in Sweden, Norway, Denmark, the Netherlands and Belgium as the word nu means "now" in Swedish, Danish, Dutch, and archaic Norwegian
- Registered domains: 227,485 (31 March 2024)
- Registration restrictions: None
- Structure: Registrations permitted at second level
- Documents: Terms and conditions
- Dispute policies: UDRP
- DNSSEC: yes
- Registry website: internetstiftelsen.se/en/domains/

.nu is the Internet country code top-level domain (ccTLD) assigned to the island state of Niue. It was one of the first ccTLDs to be marketed to the Internet at large as an alternative to the gTLDs .com, .net, and .org.

Playing on the phonetic similarity between nu and new in English, and the fact that nu means "now" in several northern European languages, it was promoted as a new TLD with an abundance of good domain names available. The .nu domain is now controlled by the Internet Foundation in Sweden amid opposition from the government of Niue.

Google treats .nu as a generic top-level domain (gTLD) because "users and website owners frequently see [the domain] as being more generic than country-targeted."

== Administration ==
Unlike most ccTLDs, .nu is not administered by a representative of its country.

In 1997, IANA awarded administration of .nu to The IUSN Foundation (formerly 'Internet Users Society - Niue'), a Massachusetts-based non-profit organisation. The administration and technical operation of the domain were transferred to The Internet Foundation in Sweden (IIS) in September 2013. The IIS said that 66.7 percent of "active" .nu domains at the time were registered to Swedish users.

The government of Niue has been trying to administer the .nu ccTLD since at least 2003. In November 2018, the government of Niue initiated a lawsuit against the IIS in the Stockholm District Court to obtain control over the domain. It stated that the Foundation had "taken over Niue's .nu domain without consent in 2013", resulting in a significant loss of revenue for the country. Niue's government stated that the .nu domain was a "national asset of Niue" and had been taken over "unfairly", estimating that it had earned between $27 million and $37 million for the IIS. A later estimate by Niue's legal team stated that the country had missed out on a total of US$150,000,000 (equivalent to $186,607,947 in 2025) during the combined time that the domain had been administered by IUSN and the IIS. The IIS responded by saying that "It was and is essential for the Swedish internet infrastructure that .nu works in a stable and secure way", and that it had "done the necessary investigations before deciding to become the registry in 2013, involving several leading legal specialists and a direct contact with the relevant governmental institutions".

The government of Niue continues the legal discussion on two fronts: directly with ICANN to get the domain name back, and with the Swedish government to reclaim the lost profits. Toke Talagi, the Premier of Niue from 2008 to 2020, called it a form of neo-colonialism.

While Niue lost its case in the lower court of Södertörns Tingsrätt, they appealed, and the court date for the appeal has been set to 19 and 20 May 2025 in Svea Hovrätt.

On 5 June 2025, the Court of Appeal dismissed the appeal, confirming that The Internet Foundation in Sweden had complied with all relevant regulations in its administration of the .nu domain. The court also ruled that the foundation could not be held liable for damages under Swedish foundation law.

The decision effectively ended Niue’s legal efforts in Sweden to reclaim control of the .nu domain or obtain compensation.

== Usage of .nu ==
The .nu domain is particularly popular in Sweden, Denmark, and the Benelux region, as nu is the word for "now" in Swedish, Danish and Dutch – an example of a domain hack. Although nu in Norwegian is an archaic word for "now", with nå being used instead, .nu was initially more popular than .no, with 43,000 .nu addresses being registered in Norway in 1999 compared to 30,000 .no ones. Partially owing to restrictive domain rules for the ccTLD assigned to Sweden, .se, .nu was used for creative marketing of websites such as www.tv.nu to show what is currently showing on TV, and in the Netherlands for websites like waarbenjij.nu (lit. 'whereareyou.now').

A former political party in Israel, Kulanu, used the domain www.koola.nu until its dissolution in 2020.

== Internationalised domains ==
In March 2000, .NU Domain Ltd became the first TLD to offer registration of Internationalized domain names, supporting the full Unicode character set. Unlike other TLDs, no browser plugin or punycode capable browser was required on the client side for use of these names, as .NU Domain's web servers converted and redirected any web queries issued in a variety of international character encodings. However, in March 2010, .NU Domain announced at ICANN that they had recently disabled their general wildcard domain name resolution technology, and thus were implementing IDNs only by the now standard punycode implementation, and were reducing the accepted set of IDN characters for .NU Domain names to a subset of the ISO-8859-1 western European characters.

== Domain revocation policy ==
.NU domain names are revoked without refund for displaying images of child pornography, being involved with phishing, spamming, email theft, search engine abuse, or any unlawful purpose.

In February 2012, library.nu, a site listing links to scanned books, a substantial number of which are claimed to be pirated copyrighted material, went offline after a coalition of the world's largest book publishers obtained an injunction against the site. A few days later the site also had its domain name revoked by domain registrar Nunames. The domain revocation was recorded in screenshots taken at the time.

== Litigation ==
A 2005 UDRP case regarding nudomain.com made the assertion under "Factual background" that "The Complainants [WorldNames, Inc. and NU Domain Ltd] own and operate the .NU ccTLD". The companies in question are operating the registry for .nu on behalf of the Internet Users Society, but it is incorrect to state that they "own" the TLD, as TLDs in general are delegated and managed rather than "owned". The case does, however, point out that these companies own a registered trademark to ".nudomain" in several countries.
