= Innovative Routines International =

American software company

Coordinates: 28.1422°N 80.5822°W

IRI, The CoSort Company
- Company type: Private
- Industry: Data processing, Sorting, Data integration, Test data, Data masking, Data conversion
- Headquarters: Melbourne, Florida, USA
- Products: CoSort, Fast Extract (FACT), NextForm, RowGen, FieldShield, CellShield, DarkShield, Voracity
- Website: www.iri.com

Innovative Routines International (IRI), Inc. is an American software company first known for bringing mainframe sort merge functionality into open systems. IRI was the first vendor to develop a commercial replacement for the Unix sort command, and combine data transformation and reporting in Unix batch processing environments. In 2007, IRI's coroutine sort ("CoSort") became the first product to collate and convert multi-gigabyte XML and LDIF files, join and lookup across multiple files, and apply role-based data privacy functions (including AES-256 encryption) for fields within sensitive files.

IRI is headquartered in Melbourne, Florida, United States, and has resale and support offices in 25 countries, including France, Japan, South Africa, and Brazil.

== Products ==
IRI software is designed to transform, convert, report, and protect large data volumes rapidly in distributed, heterogeneous computing environments. These functions are built into the CoSort package or through spin-offs for data extraction, generation, security, and migration. Each tool uses the same graphical IDE built on Eclipse, and metadata format for defining and manipulating data. IRI's open data definition file format is also supported by AnalytiX DS and Meta Integration Technology (MITI) so that third-party ETL, BI, and data modeling tool users can convert or re-use their existing metadata in IRI product environments.

== IRI CoSort ==
CoSort was released for CP/M in 1978, DOS in 1980, Unix in the mid-eighties, and Windows in the early nineties, and received a readership award from DMReview magazine in 2000, CoSort was initially designed as a file sorting utility, and added interfaces to replace or convert the sort program parameters used in IBM Infosphere DataStage, Informatica, Micro Focus COBOL, JCL, NATURAL, SAS, and SyncSort Unix.

In 1992, CoSort added related data manipulation functions through a control language interface based on DEC VAX/VMS sort utility syntax, which evolved through the years to handle file-based data integration and staging functions in data warehouse ETL operations:

CoSort Version 9 releases, begun in 2007, can simultaneously transform, convert, report, and/or protect data for ETL, business intelligence, change data capture, database load and query, application development, and data migration activities. Version 10 was released in 2018, adding support for semi-structured, streaming, and cloud data sources. Version 10.5 provided more functional and source support updates in 2021.

== IRI Voracity ==
IRI Voracity is a data management platform released in 2017 for data discovery, integration, migration, governance, and analytics. It consolidates key data curation activities in the IRI Workbench GUI (built on Eclipse (software), and transforms data in the CoSort engine or optionally in MapReduce, Spark, Spark Stream, Storm, or Tez. Voracity includes most standalone IRI tools, and adds data classification, data profiling, data quality, ETL, metadata management, master data management, change data capture, data federation, and multiple job design and control capabilities.

=== IRI FACT ===
FACT (FAst ExtraCT) is a high-performance unload utility for Oracle, IBM Db2, Sybase ASE and IQ, SQL Server, MySQL, Altibase, and Tibero. It exports large tables in parallel to flat files for archive, ETL, reorg, reporting and other applications. FACT and CoSort used together "provide for rapid unloading and transformation of data in Oracle databases in support of ETL processes."

=== IRI NextForm ===
NextForm is a data migration spin-off from CoSort functionality designed to convert between structured file formats such as CSV, ISAM, LDIF, and XML, plus data types such as ASCII, EBCDIC, Unicode, and Packed Decimal. Newer NextForm editions can structure data in unstructured sources, convert COBOL Vision files, and facilitate database migration and replication.

=== IRI RowGen ===
RowGen is designed to generate test data in production table, file, and report formats for prototype database population, compliance, outsourcing, and application prototyping projects. RowGen's GUI parses data models to define table layouts and relationships so database test sets are structurally and referentially correct. RowGen can also transform and format test data during its generation.

=== IRI FieldShield ===
FieldShield is a CoSort spin-off designed to protect data privacy in structured and some semi-structured data sources. The software classifies and masks personally identifiable information and other private data at the field or record level within database tables, files and other sources subject to data spill. Privacy functions include AES encryption, data masking, and pseudonymization. Job details can be audited from a log file in XML format.

=== IRI DarkShield ===
DarkShield is another data classification and data masking product front-ended in IRI Workbench for finding and protecting personally identifiable information in structured, semi-structured and unstructured sources on-premise or in the cloud. DarkShield shares data classes and masking functions with FieldShield and also supports flat files and relational databases, but is purpose-built for NoSQL databases, images (in BMP, GIF, JPG, PNG, TIF and DICOM format), signatures, and files in JSON, XML, HL7, X12, FHIR, raw text, Parquet, PDF, Microsoft Office, and audio formats. DarkShield runs self-hosted on Windows or Linux hardware and can reach files in Amazon S3, Azure Blob, Google Cloud Platform, and SharePoint Online. It combines search and mask operations in the same job and can run from the GUI, command-line or API to support DevOps pipelines, dynamic data masking, and load balancing.
