= Vi sitter i Ventrilo och spelar DotA =

Single by Basshunter

from the album LOL
- Released: 3 October 2006
- Recorded: 2006
- Genre: Eurodance; trance; EDM; hi-NRG
- Length: 3:21 (single version); 7:45 (extended version); 2:58 (new single version); 5:42 (club mix)
- Label: Warner; Ultra
- Songwriters: David Le Roy; Jean-Christophe Belval
- Lyricist: Basshunter (Note: Basshunter wrote Swedish lyrics.)
- Producer: Basshunter

Basshunter singles chronology
"Boten Anna" (2006)	"Vi sitter i Ventrilo och spelar DotA" (2006)	"Jingle Bells" (2006)

Basshunter singles chronology
"Vifta med händerna" (2006)	"DotA" (2007)	"Now You're Gone" (2007)

Alternative cover
- 2007 "DotA" cover

Music video
- "Vi sitter i Ventrilo och spelar DotA" on YouTube

"Vi sitter i Ventrilo och spelar DotA" (Swedish for "We're sitting in Ventrilo, playing DotA" and shortened to "DotA") is a song by Swedish musician Basshunter which samples a remixed version of the French song "Daddy DJ" by Daddy DJ. The lyrics, in Swedish, are about using the voice chat program Ventrilo while playing Defense of the Ancients, a fan-made game mode within Warcraft III: Reign of Chaos. The song incorporates samples from the game. It was released as the second single from Basshunter's second album LOL.

== Release ==
An English version of the song called "All I Ever Wanted" was released as the second UK single on 7 July 2008. The second single was originally planned to be "Please Don't Go", but due to some technical issues the single was scrapped in the UK and only released in Sweden.

== Music video ==
The video starts out with Basshunter's mother opening a door where it reveals that he and his friends are playing DotA. She tells him that he is playing too much DotA when he starts singing. The video continues showing him playing DotA and later singing at a gamehall live. The clip was not shot during DreamHack, as many believe, but during a similar event called The Gathering, one of the world's largest LAN party events. One of the listeners holds a sign saying "Vadå båt?" (Whaddaya mean boat?) - referring to some listeners' initial confusion of the Swedish lyrics in "Boten Anna", mistaking the word "boten" (the bot) for "båten" (the boat). This could explain the wrong translation in the German version of "Boten Anna" where "Boot" (boat) is sung instead of "Bot" (bot). Another approach is that the person holding the sign is German and wanted to point out the mistake, so Basshunter simply recorded this as a kind of self-parody.

The new video starts with him sitting in a chair, then flipping up a screen on his chair, then selects a video from a little menu floating in the air. Then the videos from there shows more people playing DotA, and several shots of a young woman dancing. He can also be seen playing as the hero Tiny, where he purchases an item, Butterfly. The new video uses the New Single Version mix.

The music video was directed in Malmö by Carl-Johan Westregård and Kim Parrot.

== Critical reception ==
In 2016 GFOTY mentioned "DotA" as one of her inspirations. In 2017, the song was included in "Monstercat's 50 Best Gaming Songs Ever" by Monstercat. In 2024 Derek Hanson from Spin included "DotA" in his list of songs that capture the spirit of gaming.

== Adaptations ==
In 2017, The8BitDrummer recorded a drum cover of "Vi sitter i Ventrilo och spelar DotA". In 2021, Dvnk1 recorded a cover of "Vi sitter i Ventrilo och spelar DotA" entitled "Vi åker här i Volvon".

== Track listing ==
CD single
No.	Title	Length
1.	"Vi sitter i Ventrilo och spelar DotA" (Single Version)	3:21
2.	"Vi sitter i Ventrilo och spelar DotA" (Club Mix)	5:43
Total length:		9:04

== Charts ==
=== Weekly charts ===
2006 weekly chart performance for "Vi sitter i Ventrilo och spelar DotA"
Chart (2006)	Peak position
Denmark (Tracklisten)	7
Finland (Suomen virallinen lista)	2
Netherlands (Dutch Top 40)	18
Netherlands (Single Top 100)	9
Norway (VG-lista)	7
Slovakia Airplay (ČNS IFPI)	54
Sweden (Sverigetopplistan)	6

2007 weekly chart performance for "Vi sitter i Ventrilo och spelar DotA"
Chart (2007)	Peak position
Austria (Ö3 Austria Top 40)	18
Germany (Official German Charts) DotA (Note: The Offizielle Deutsche Charts subpage for "Vi sitter i Ventrilo och spelar DotA" and the artist's subpage indicate chart entries for both "Vi sitter i Ventrilo och spelar DotA" and "DotA" versions on 19 October 2007, with peak positions of 33 and 30 respectively. However, the chart subpage for 19 October 2007 does not list "Vi sitter i Ventrilo och spelar DotA", but instead lists "DotA" at number 33 while "Alles verloren" by Bushido is listed at number 30. "DotA" peaked at number 30 on 2 November.)	30

2008 weekly chart performance for "Vi sitter i Ventrilo och spelar DotA"
Chart (2008)	Peak position
Ireland (IRMA)	49

2010 weekly chart performance for "Vi sitter i Ventrilo och spelar DotA"
Chart (2010)	Peak position
US Dance/Electronic Digital Song Sales (Billboard)	20

=== Year-end charts ===
Yearly chart performance for "Vi sitter i Ventrilo och spelar DotA"
Chart (2006)	Position
Netherlands (MegaCharts)	89
Sweden (Sverigetopplistan)	16

== Certifications ==
Certifications and sales for "Vi sitter i Ventrilo och spelar DotA"
Region	Certification	Certified units/sales
Denmark (IFPI Danmark)	Gold	4,000^{^}
^{^} Shipments figures based on certification alone.

Certifications and sales for "DotA"
Region	Certification	Certified units/sales
Denmark (IFPI Danmark)	Gold	45,000^{^}
^{^} Shipments figures based on certification alone.
