= European Academic and Research Network =

Old academic research computer network connecting universities in Europe and the USA

The European Academic and Research Network (EARN) was a computer network connecting universities and research institutions across Europe, and was connected in 1983 via transatlantic circuits and a gateway funded by IBM to BITNET, its peer in the United States.

== History ==
Services available on EARN/BITNET included electronic mail, file transfer, real-time terminal messages, and access to EARN server machines which provided information retrieval services. Gateways existed from EARN to the ARPA Internet (ARPANET, MILNET, NSFNET, CSNET, X25Net), UUCP, JANET (Great Britain's Joint Academic Network), and more than 10 other national academic and research networks. There also was limited access to VNET, IBM's internal communications network.

At the network layer EARN was based on a "store-and-forward" technology. In a "store-and-forward" network information is sent to an intermediate node where it is kept and sent as soon as possible to the next node on the path to its final destination. The intermediate node verifies the integrity of the message before forwarding it. Each time the intermediate node confirms the receipt of the data the originating node deletes it. The EARN "store-and-forward" system was originally based on IBM's technology and used the Remote Spooling Communications Subsystem (RSCS) and NJE/NJI protocols on the IBM Virtual Machine (VM) mainframe operating systems, and JES2 (and later JES3, Job Entry Subsystem) on IBM MVS mainframe operating systems.

At the physical layer the network backbone initially comprised a set of dedicated telephone circuits connected via pairs of synchronous modems with speed varying from 1.2 kbit/s to 9.6 kbit/s. Each country in Europe managed its own national backbone, which was then connected via one international circuit to the European backbone.

Through most of the 1980s the entire traffic between the European backbone and the United States BITNET backbone was carried over a single 4.8 kbit/s circuit and afterward, for quite some time, over a single 9.6 kbit/s circuit using a pair of IBM synchronous modems. Later in the late 1980s, the backbone bandwidth was gradually augmented to accommodate for the increased traffic; but, given the very high prices for dedicated telephone circuits at the time, it became soon clear EARN could no longer afford a dedicated European backbone. Since the IBM sponsorship of international and transatlantic lines had stopped in fact each European country member of EARN, typically the organization in charge of each national academic network, was paying its own line to connect to the European backbone and was sharing the cost of the transatlantic connectivity via the EARN annual contribution.

On 20 October 1994, EARN merged with RARE (Réseaux Associés pour la Recherche Européenne) which became TERENA.

== Activities ==
A technology called VMNET was released in April 1989 at Princeton University, allowing NJE network links to operate over circuits using TCP/IP as the underlying protocol. VMNET was first used in Europe in December 1989. It opened the door for EARN to share the same physical circuits used by the other organizations connecting to the Internet. This link, along with the March 1990 link between CERN and NSFNET over the TAT-8 cable helped pave the way for the acceptance of Internet protocols in Europe by 1992.

After the advent of EBONE EARN canceled its private line to the US at the end of 1991, invested the money into EBONE, and was able to use EBONE to carry its traffic around Europe and across the Atlantic, drastically reducing the network cost for its members and granting to all EARN countries access to a total of 4.5 Mb (at the time a fairly large amount) redundant connectivity to the US.

This web site provides a comprehensive overview of EARN and contains a large number of original documents and pictures related to EARN.

== See also ==
- National research and education network
- TERENA
