= CERN openlab =

Swiss technology organization

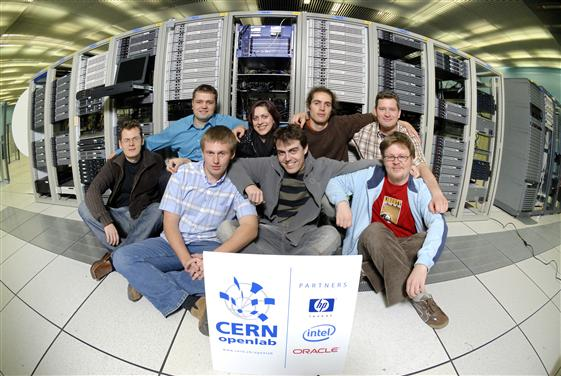
- CERN openlab fellows and staff at the computer centre
- Key people: Maria Girone (Head)
- Parent organization: CERN
- Website: openlab.cern

CERN openlab is a collaboration between CERN and industrial partners to develop new knowledge in Information and Communication Technologies through the evaluation of advanced tools and joint research to be used by the worldwide community of scientists working at the Large Hadron Collider.

Intel, Oracle, Google, Micron and Siemens are all partner companies for the sixth phase of CERN openlab. IBM, E4 Computer Engineering and be-studys are contributors, while Comtrade, and Open Systems are associate members.

In 2015, other public research organisations joined CERN openlab for the first time. The current research members are Fermilab, INFN, ScimPulse, King's College London, Samara University, Eindhoven University of Technology and Newcastle University.

== History ==
The CERN openlab concept started in 2001 led by Manuel Delfino, and since 2003 it has run in successive phases of three years. During CERN openlab I (2003-2005) an advanced prototype called opencluster was developed. CERN openlab II (2006-2008) focused on various domains such as platforms, databases, grid computing, security and networks. This work was continued by CERN openlab III (2009-2011) which also hosted projects with emphasis on technologies and services relevant to CERN and its partners. Later, CERN openlab IV (2012-2014) paid particular attention to cloud computing, business analytics, the next generation of hardware, and security for large numbers of network devices.

From 2002 to 2010 the head of CERN openlab was Wolfgang von Rüden. His successor was Bob Jones who served until 2015. From 2015 to 2023 the collaboration was led by Alberto Di Meglio. Maria Girone is the current CERN openlab Head, who started in April of 2023.
