= Rickard Eriksson =

Swedish entrepreneur

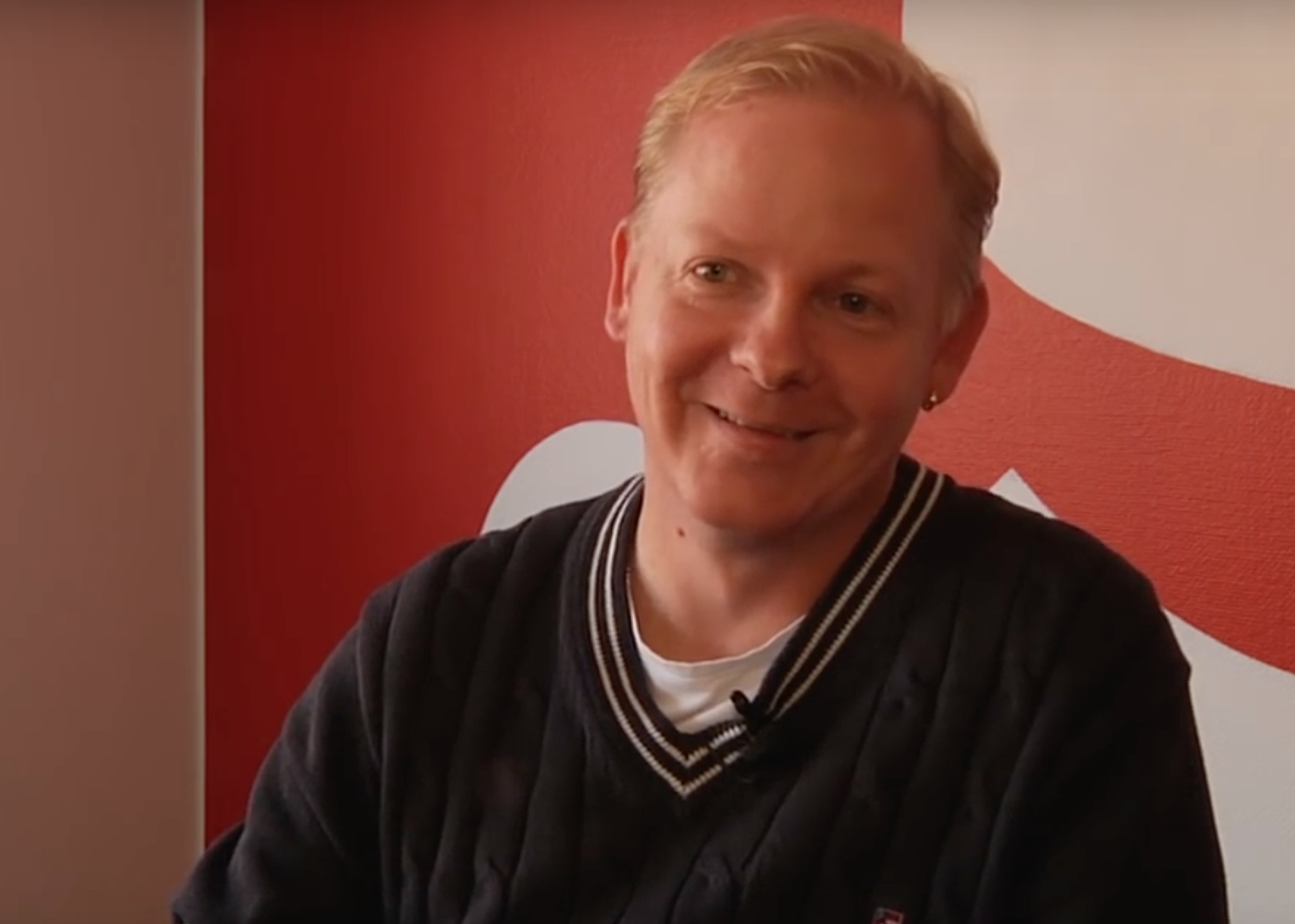
Rickard Eriksson, Swedish entrepreneur, programmer and founder of the community Lunarstorm.

Rickard Eriksson is a Swedish entrepreneur, known as the founder of an early social networking website, LunarStorm. Rickard was born 1974 on the west coast of Sweden in Varberg, county of Halland and still resides in that area. Eriksson attended secondary school LBS in Varberg.

After managing several BBSs for seven years, in 1996 he created a web community named Stajl Plejs, renamed LunarStorm at the millennium shift. The name came from his girlfriend's nickname at Stajl Plejs. LunarStorm existed in Sweden, the United Kingdom and Denmark.

Eriksson has appeared many times in Swedish and international press, has received numerous awards, and was appointed one of Sweden's biggest IT and telecom personalities. Rickard is also an appreciated lecturer.

In late 2006 Rickard chose to leave LunarStorm to spend his time on other projects in his own company.
