= The Swedish Internet Foundation =

Swedish foundation

The Swedish Internet Foundation (Swedish: Stiftelsen för Internetinfrastruktur, more commonly known as Internetstiftelsen) is an independent public-service organisation that acts to ensure positive development of the internet. The foundation is based in Sweden and is responsible for the internet's Swedish top-level domain, .se, and the operation of the .nu top-level domain, that of Niue. It is also a public-service organization that operates identity federations, which comprise secure and scalable services for account and password management. These create the preconditions to facilitate work with digital processes within healthcare and schools in Sweden.

The Swedish Internet Foundation's charter states that any surplus should be used to improve the stability of internet infrastructure in Sweden and to promote research, training and education with a focus on the internet. The goal is to invest at least 25 percent of the revenue in various projects that develop the internet. In 2020, SEK 88.1 million was invested.

The Swedish Internet Foundation is responsible for Internetmuseum, a Swedish digital museum opened in 2014. In June 2016 Internetmuseum was inducted to The Association of Swedish Museums (Riksförbundet Sveriges museer) as the first entirely digital museum. The ambition of the museum is to spread knowledge of the Swedish history of Internet and to preserve the digital heritage.

Until 2017, its name was Internet Foundation in Sweden, abbreviated IIS.

== Dispute with Niue ==
The government of Niue was recognized as the holder of legal rights to administer its country code top-level domain, .nu, until 2003, when it signed the rights away to the IUSN Foundation, a Massachusetts-based non-profit organization created for the purpose of funding free unlimited internet access and wifi in Niue through revenue from the domain name. The right was transferred to The Internet Foundation in Sweden (IIS) in September 2013. According to the government of Niue this transfer "to take over Niue's .nu domain (happened) without consent".

The government of Niue has been trying to get back control over its country code top-level domain ever since. An estimate by Niue's legal team stated that the country had missed out on a total of around US$150,000,000 (equivalent to $186,607,947 in 2025) during the combined time that the domain had been administered by IUSN and The Swedish Internet Foundation.

The government of Niue has not been able to find an agreement with the Swedish Internet Foundation and started a legal case on two fronts: directly with ICANN to get the domain name back, and with the Swedish government to reclaim the lost profits. Toke Talagi, the long-serving Premier of Niue who died in 2020, called it a form of neo-colonialism.
