= Peter Löthberg =

Technology entrepreneur (b. 1960)

- Born: 1960 (age 65–66); Karlstad, Sweden
- Occupation: Technology entrepreneur
- Years active: late 1970s–present
- Relatives: Lars Löthberg

Peter Löthberg (born 1960) is a Swedish technology entrepreneur. He played a role in the growth of the Internet in Sweden and was the de facto architect of EBONE (European Backbone), a pan-European Internet backbone, during its lifetime. He was the designer of Cisco's GSR12000 backbone router technology and the TeraStream architecture, along with Guenter Honisch. He was involved with Sprint's Internet infrastructure strategy. Löthberg is the owner of telecommunications company Swedish Telecom Development and Product Innovation (STUPI).

== Early life ==
Löthberg was born in 1960 in Karlstad, Sweden. He founded STUPI in the late 1970s before reaching the age of 20.

== Career ==
He worked as a consultant for his town as well as the Swedish Armed Forces. In the 1980s, he moved to Stockholm and began developing laser printer technology. During this time he built a private mainframe center called the Colossal Cave Computer Center, near Mariatorget at Söder, consisting of DEC-10 minicomputers. In 1993, Löthberg established a Swedish NTP server using STUPI AB.

Löthberg submitted several patent applications to the United States Patent and Trademark Office. While some are pending, others were granted, such as the technology used for monitoring optical performance in an optical data transmission network.

In the mid-1990s, Löthberg began working for Cisco and Sprint. Since 2010, he has worked primarily for Deutsche Telekom as a chief architect with the project TeraStream.

== Personal life ==
He resides in Charlottesville, Virginia USA.

== Works and recognition ==
Löthberg co-founded the Nordic University Computer Clubs Conference (NUCCC) together with Carl and Jacob Hallén. He made important contributions to the Internet Engineering Task Force. Löthberg also leads the TU-stiftelsen, along with Leif Johansson and Olle E Johansson. The foundation operates the Netnod Internet Exchange i Sverige, a Swedish independent Internet infrastructure organization.

In 2005, Löthberg was awarded the IP prize by the Swedish Network Users' Society (SNUS). In 2007, he installed a 40-gigabit Internet connection for his mother Sigbritt Löthberg, (reported as the world's fastest private Internet connection at that time) to prove a modulation technique that can transfer data between routers separated by a distance of 2,000 kilometers. She was able to download a full high definition DVD in two seconds. With the initiative, Löthberg sought to persuade ISPs to invest in Internet infrastructure that provides faster connections at lower cost. It was deployed in collaboration with Karlstad Stadsnät. Peter Löthberg was in 2022 awarded the gold medal from Royal Swedish Academy of Engineering Sciences.
