= Dayviews =

Swedish website

Dayviews (formerly Bilddagboken, "picture diary") was a Swedish virtual community where users can upload photographs and present these to other members. The community has succeeded well on the virtual community market in Sweden, primarily because the site was aimed entirely at sharing images, while other communities in Sweden were mostly aimed at chatting. The page was, according to themselves, Sweden's largest and fastest growing website. (Statistics about Swedish commercial websites is available at Kiaindex)

The page had about 20,000 to 80,000 members logged in at any given time and about six million visitors (one million unique visitors) per week in July 2008.

On 15 October 2007 it was confirmed that Lunarstorm had bought 40% of Bilddagboken.

On 14 June 2008, the community surpassed more than 200 million uploaded images. It also reached 800,000 members in the same week.

In October 2008, Bilddagboken had more than 100,000 users logged in at the same time, setting a record for itself. This effectively overloaded the servers and caused slow surfing at their site. Recently, Bilddagboken has also created a new forum for all users.

In 2008, Bilddagboken was available in 5 different languages.

The Bilddagboken sister sites had been 'live' for almost 2 years and failed to capture any presence within International markets.

Bilddagboken.se and Myphotodiary.com were merged in November 2009, with a link to change language in the footer of the page, although only Swedish and English were available at ther time. The other localizations were still separate sites.

The website was closed on 1 September 2017, with the owners citing a declining userbase in the face of competing services.
