= CodeWeek =

EU initiative to teach basic programming

EU Codeweek (also stylized as CodeWeek) is an initiative started in 2013 by the European Union to increase basic programming knowledge among children and young people.

== History ==
Codeweek was launched in 2013 by Neelie Kroes – at the time Vice President of the European Commission – as part of a broader European digital agenda. With the increase in the number of devices running software, there is a growing need for programmers, and the organization wants to introduce children to computer language at a young age through this initiative.

Codeweek is a week during which free events are organized in schools, libraries, and other locations across Europe to teach more children and young people the basics of programming. In 2022, eighty European countries participated.

The first edition took place in 2013 with approximately 10,000 participants attending 3,000 activities across 26 countries. Since then, EU Code Week has expanded into an international initiative supported by the European Commission and a network of volunteer ambassadors, educators, schools, ad community organisations. By 2026, there were at active EU Code Week communities in at least 39 European countries

=== Participating countries ===
By 2026, 71 countries are taking part in Code Week, featuring an annual competition that ranks countries by the ratio of activities to their population size. These are the participating countries.

1. Albania
2. Armenia
3. Austria
4. Azerbaijan
5. Belgium
6. Bolivia
7. Bosnia and Herzegovina
8. Bulgaria
9. Colombia
10. Croatia
11. Cyprus
12. Czech Republic
13. Democratic Republic of the Congo
14. Denmark
15. Estonia
16. Egypt
17. Finland
18. France
19. Georgia
20. Germany
21. Greece
22. Hungary
23. Iceland
24. Indonesia
25. India
26. Ireland
27. Italy
28. Japan
29. Jordan
30. Kazakhstan
31. Kenya
32. Kosovo
33. Kuwait
34. Kyrgyzstan
35. Latvia
36. Lebanon
37. Liechtenstein
38. Lithuania
39. Luxembourg
40. Malta
41. Malaysia
42. Moldova
43. Monaco
44. Montenegro
45. Morrocco
46. Netherlands
47. Niger
48. North Macedonia
49. Norway
50. Pakistan
51. Palestine
52. Philippines
53. Peru
54. Poland
55. Portugal
56. Romania
57. Saudi Arabia
58. Serbia
59. Singapore
60. Slovakia
61. Slovenia
62. Spain
63. Sweden
64. Switzerland
65. Syria
66. Thailand
67. Tunisia
68. Türkiye (Turkey)
69. Ukraine
70. United Kingdom
71. United States
