= Institutet för rättsinformatik =

Coordinates: 59.36250144371392°N 18.060062899803004°E

Institutet för rättsinformatik (IRI) is the Swedish Law & Informatics Research Institute within the Faculty of Law at Stockholm University. The institute examines the relationship and interaction between law and IT. IRI not only focuses on legal issues of technology and the Internet (legal aspects of computing), but also on the development of technical solutions within the legal field (legal informatics).

IRI was founded in 1968 as the Working Party for EDP and Law. The working party enabled specialised research into the fields of legal informatics and legal aspects of computing and was also very successful in supporting a network of lawyers within these fields. In 1981, the Working Party was rearranged into IRI at Stockholm University and as part of the networking the Swedish Association for IT and Law (ADBJ) was established.

The Swedish Law & Informatics Research Institute also runs the team blog, Blawblaw, with posts in English and Swedish.
