= Passagen (web portal) =

Passagen is a Swedish web portal started in 1994 by Ken Ceder, Lars-Erik Eriksson and Mattias Söderhielm at Telia, and was launched in October 1995. Until 1999, it was Sweden's second largest web site. It provides the hosting of blogs and homepages, forums, chat, and free e-mail and profile pages. The most recent addition is a quiz application.

Between 1998 and 2001 Passagen was owned by the Norwegian media company Schibsted. Since 2001 it has been owned by Eniro Sverige AB.

In November, 2022 the domain and business was acquired by Data-World GmbH, with the aim to focus the business on fintech and the gaming industry.
