= LunarStorm =

Swedish social networking website

- Website type: Virtual community
- Available in: Swedish
- Owner: Wyatt Media Group
- Website: LunarStorm.se
- Commercial: Yes
- Launched: 2000
- Current status: Abandoned

LunarStorm, in Swedish often shortened to Lunar, was a Swedish commercial advertisement-financed social networking website for teenagers, which was also available in the United Kingdom before 2007. "LunarStorm" was operated by a company called LunarWorks. According to the company's official statistics, the website had 1.2 million members in 2007, of whom some 70% were 12–17 years old. The website drastically dropped in popularity since then and in June 2010, Wyatt Media Groups (the owner of LunarStorm at that time) announced that LunarStorm would be shut down on 18 August 2010 due to lack of activity.

== History ==
The predecessor to Lunarstorm was called "StajlPlejs" (i.e. "Style Place" transcribed to Swedish spelling), which started around 1996. It was created by Rickard Eriksson as Europe's first digital online community. Lunarstorm officially opened on 1 January 2000, after Lunarworks had taken over StajlPlejs and decided to rename it after the username used at the website by Rickard Erikssons girlfriend.

In 2001, LunarStorm had grown to over 600,000 members but still experienced economic hardships. After the beginning, LunarStorm was financed by banners and other advertising on the website, but this soon evolved to include more of pay-by-SMS services. An early example was LunarStorm's own pre-paid card "Vrål" ("Roar"). In 2002, "Kolla" ("Look" or "Check this out") was introduced which allowed users to visit LunarStorm from their mobile phones. In the same year, members were able to upgrade their membership to "pro" status and get unlimited access to a range of services for a fee. LunarStorm Pro was extremely popular among the member base and it improved the website's economic situation greatly.

Another great source of revenue was LunarStorm's cooperation with other companies. An early business partner was OLW who sponsored "RajRaj", a party-oriented photo album ("RajRaj" being Swedish slang for party). But LunarStorm has through the years also cooperated with numerous other companies including Arla, EA Games, Loka, McDonald's, Coca-Cola, Aftonbladet, Sveriges Radio and Logitech.

In September 2006, the website style was changed. The change had already been introduced at the British sister site a few months earlier (May - June).

In February 2007, LunarWorks bought 40 percent of the shares in Bilddagboken, an increasingly big competitor to LunarStorm. At the same time, LunarStorm replaced the "Kollage" service which allowed you to upload images for a fee with the free "Gallery", to compete with Bilddagbokens free picture upload functions. Eight months later, on 4 October 2007, the owners of LunarStorm announced that they had bought the remaining shares of Bilddagboken, as well as 57 percent of the online Swedish-English dictionary Tyda.se. LunarStorm, Bilddagboken and Tyda.se are now parts of Wyatt Media Group, owned by Sten Mörtstedt.

Both the Danish and British branches of the website were closed down on 13 July 2007.

On 13 December 2007, LunarStorm removed "Pro" from the website and made all the content free. Focus was instead put on a new function called "Club Lunar" where members got access to "exclusive offers" and "cool competitions". Lately, the popularity of LunarStorm has dramatically decreased which the owners explain with an increased competition from other social networking sites for young people in Sweden such as Bilddagboken. For example, the daily question that used to be answered by about 150 000 members per day and was used by polling institutes to study opinions of Swedish youth has now shrunk to about 10,000 - 12,000 daily answers, as of summer 2009. The number of users concurrently online went from about 100,000 to only 1,500 as of 2009.
