= List of Norwegian musicians =

This is a list of notable Norwegian musicians and bands. The genres are as given in the individual articles.

== Acoustic and folk ==
- Alf Prøysen
- Annbjørg Lien
- Arild Andersen
- Bjørn Berge
- Bjørn Eidsvåg
- Einar Stray Orchestra
- Halvdan Sivertsen
- Jan Eggum
- Julian Berntzen
- Kari Bremnes
- Lillebjørn Nilsen
- Mari Boine
- Steinar Karlsen
- Nils Økland
- Odd Nordstoga
- Ole Paus
- Øystein Sunde
- Secret Garden
- Staut
- Sturle Dagsland
- Thea Hjelmeland
- Tønes
- Vamp
- Wardruna

== Classical ==
- Aline Nistad
- Arve Tellefsen
- Bergen Philharmonic Orchestra
- Christian Tetzlaff
- Det Norske Kammerorkester
- Edvard Grieg
- Håkon Austbø
- Håvard Gimse
- Henning Kraggerud
- Kjell Bækkelund
- Leif Ove Andsnes
- Lise Davidsen
- Marianne Thorsen
- Ole Bull
- Ole Edvard Antonsen
- Oslo Philharmonic
- Ragnhild Hemsing
- Rolf Lislevand
- Solveig Kringlebotn
- Tine Thing Helseth
- Trondheim Soloists
- Truls Mørk
- Vilde Frang
- Wolfgang Plagge

== Trailer Music ==
- Thomas Bergersen

== DJs ==
- Alan Walker
- Broiler
- Cashmere Cat
- C-Systems
- CLMD
- Kygo
- KREAM
- K-391
- Lemaitre
- Lido
- Matoma
- Martin Tungevaag
- Madden
- Boom Jinx
- Ralph Myerz
- Pegboard Nerds
- SeeB

== Jazz ==
- Arild Andersen
- Jon Christensen
- Jan Garbarek
- Tord Gustavsen
- John Pål Inderberg
- Karin Krog
- Anni-Frid Lyngstad
- Bjarne Nerem
- Robert Normann
- Terje Rypdal
- Torbjørn Sunde
- Thorgeir Stubø
- Radka Toneff

== Pop and rock ==
- a-ha
- Alexander Rybak
- Ane Brun
- Angelina Jordan
- Anja Garbarek
- Anneli Drecker
- Annie
- Astrid S
- AURORA
- Bertine Zetlitz
- BigBang
- Bobbysocks
- boy pablo
- Briskeby
- Christian Ingebrigtsen (A1)
- Crash (n)
- Dagny
- Carina Dahl
- Dance with a Stranger
- Deeyah
- deLillos
- Di Derre
- Didrik Solli-Tangen
- Donkeyboy
- Dråpe
- Draumir
- Dum Dum Boys
- Dylan Mondegreen
- Emily Blue
- Ephemera
- Espen Lind
- The First Cut
- Jetsurfers
- Freddy Kalas
- Gabrielle Leithaug
- Girl in Red
- Gåte
- Her Royal Harness
- Highasakite
- Ida Maria
- Iselin Michelsen
- Iselin Solheim
- Jan Bang
- Jan Werner Danielsen
- Jarle Bernhoft
- The Jessica Fletchers
- Jim Stärk
- Johns Quijote
- Julie Bergan
- Kaizers Orchestra
- Kakkmaddafakka
- Kate Havnevik
- Katzenjammer
- Kid Astray
- The Kids
- Kings of Convenience
- Ketil Bjornstad
- L8R
- Lene Marlin
- Lilyjets
- Lorraine
- Ludvig Moon
- M2M
- Madrugada
- Magne Furuholmen
- Marcus & Martinus
- The Margarets
- Maria Haukaas Mittet
- Maria Mena
- Maria Solheim
- Marit Larsen
- Morten Abel
- Morten Harket
- The National Bank
- Noora Noor
- Per Bergersen
- Poor Rich Ones
- Savoy
- Sigrid (singer)
- Silje Nergaard
- Sissel Kyrkjebø
- Sivert Høyem
- Sondre Justad
- Sondre Lerche
- Sturle Dagsland
- Surferosa
- Susanna and the Magical Orchestra
- Susanne Sundfør
- Team Me
- Terje Rypdal
- Thom Hell
- Thomas Dybdahl
- TIX
- Torgunn Flaten
- Trine Rein
- Vamp
- Velvet Belly
- Violet Scene
- Venke Knutson
- William Hut
- Winta
- Wobbler
- Åge Aleksandersen
- Ylvis

== Hard rock and punk ==
- Amulet
- Audrey Horne
- Black Debbath
- Dum Dum Boys
- El Caco
- Gluecifer
- Hudkreft
- Johndoe
- Jørn Lande
- JR Ewing
- Motorpsycho
- Seigmen
- Skambankt
- Stonegard
- Thulsa Doom
- TNT
- Trucks
- Turbonegro
- Zeromancer

== Electronica and similar genres ==
- Aleksander Vinter
- Alog
- Amethystium
- Apoptygma Berzerk
- Arcane Station
- Bel Canto
- Biosphere
- Bjørn Torske
- Casiokids
- Combichrist
- Echo Image
- Eirik Glambek Bøe
- Erlend Øye
- Flunk
- Håvard Ellefsen
- Jaga Jazzist
- Jenny Hval
- Lindstrøm & Prins Thomas
- Martin Tungevaag
- Magnus August Høiberg
- Margaret Berger
- Moyka (singer)
- Robert Solheim
- Röyksopp
- Sturle Dagsland
- Todd Terje
- Ugress
- Ulver
- Wibutee
- Xploding Plastix

== Rap and hip hop ==
- Trevis Brendmoe
- Miss Tati
- Tommy Tee
- Definite
- Diaz
- Nico & Vinz
- Gatas Parlament
- Karpe Diem
- Klovner I Kamp
- Lars Vaular
- Madcon
- Side Brok
- Stella Mwangi
- Erik og Kriss

== Metal ==
- 1349 (Black metal)
- Aeternus (Death metal)
- Abbath (Black Metal)
- Age of Silence (Avant-garde/Progressive metal)
- Ancient (Symphonic black metal)
- Antestor (Black metal)
- Arcturus (Avant-garde metal)
- Atrox (Avant-garde metal)
- Ásmegin (Folk/Viking/Black metal)
- Borknagar (Progressive/Folk/Black metal)
- Burzum (Black metal/Ambient)
- Cadaver (Death metal)
- Carpathian Forest (Black metal)
- Darkthrone (Black metal)
- Den Saakaldte (Black metal)
- Dimmu Borgir (Symphonic black metal/Symphonic extreme metal)
- Djevel (Black metal)
- Dødheimsgard (Avant-garde/Black/Industrial black metal)
- Emily Blue (Death metal/Nu metal)
- Emperor (Black metal/Symphonic extreme metal)
- Enslaved (Progressive black/Viking metal)
- Extol (Progressive/Extreme/Christian metal)
- Gehenna (Black metal)
- Gorgoroth (Black metal)
- Green Carnation (Death metal/Progressive metal)
- Glittertind (Black/Viking/Folk metal)
- Hades Almighty (Black/Doom metal)
- Helheim (Black/Viking metal)
- Immortal (Black metal)
- I (Black metal)
- In the Woods... (Progressive metal)
- Isengard (Black/Viking metal)
- Khold (Black metal)
- Koldbrann (Black metal)
- The Kovenant (Avant-garde/Black/Industrial metal)
- Lengsel (Progressive/Black metal)
- Leprous (Progressive)
- Leaves' Eyes (Gothic metal/Symphonic metal)
- Limbonic Art (Symphonic black metal)
- Madder Mortem (Doom metal/Avant-garde metal/Progressive metal)
- Mayhem (Avant-garde/Black metal)
- Mortiis (Industrial rock/Ambient)
- Myrkskog (Death metal)
- Nattefrost (Black metal)
- Old Man's Child (Symphonic black metal/Melodic black metal)
- Orcustus (Black metal)
- Ov Hell (Black metal)
- Pagan's mind (Progressive Metal/Power Metal)
- Peccatum (Avant-garde extreme metal/Avant-garde gothic rock)
- Posthum (Black metal)
- Ragnarok (Black metal)
- Ram-Zet (Avant-garde metal)
- Satyricon (Black metal)
- Sirenia (Gothic metal)
- The Sins of Thy Beloved (Gothic-doom/Symphonic metal)
- Solefald (Avant-garde metal)
- Susperia (Black/Thrash metal)
- Taake (Black metal)
- The 3rd and the Mortal (Doom metal/Ambient/Experimental)
- Theatre of Tragedy (Doom metal/Gothic/Industrial rock)
- Thorns (Industrial black metal)
- Trail of Tears (Gothic/Symphonic black metal)
- Tristania (Gothic metal)
- Troll (Melodic black metal/Industrial black metal)
- Tsjuder (Black metal)
- Ulver (Black/Avant-garde metal/Electronic/Experimental)
- Urgehal (Black metal)
- Windir (Folk/Black metal)
- Winds (Neoclassical progressive metal)
- Zyklon (Blackened death metal)
- Zyklon-B (Black metal)

== Traditional Norwegian folk ==
- Agnes Buen Garnås
- Annbjørg Lien
- Anne Hytta
- Egil Storbekken
- Eivind Groven
- Gjermund Larsen
- Johan Sara
- Jorun Marie Kvernberg
- Kirsten Bråten Berg
- Knut Buen
- Mari Boine
- Nils Økland
- Øyonn Groven Myhren
- Peter L. Rypdal
- Sigbjørn Apeland
- Sinikka Langeland
- Sondre Bratland
- Susanne Lundeng

== See also ==
- List of Norwegian operatic sopranos
