= Endless (Inna song) =

Single by Inna

from the album I Am the Club Rocker
- Released: 25 November 2011
- Genre: Electropop, Latin house
- Length: 3:14
- Label: Ultra
- Songwriters: Sebastian Barac; Radu Bolfea; Marcel Botezan
- Producer: Play & Win

Inna singles chronology
"Un Momento" (2011)	"Endless" (2011)	"Wow" (2012)

"Endless" is a song recorded by Romanian singer Inna for her second studio album, I Am the Club Rocker (2011). The song was released on 25 November 2011 as the fourth single from the album. It was written and produced by Play & Win members Sebastian Barac, Radu Bolfea and Marcel Botezan. A flamenco-influenced mid-tempo club-ballad, "Endless" features an acoustic and Spanish guitar in its instrumentation.

Music critics gave favorable reviews of the track, pointing it out as a highlight on I Am the Club Rocker. At the 2011 Balkan Music Awards, the song won in the Best Song in the Balkans from Romania in 2011 category. To promote "Endless", an accompanying music video was shot by Alex Herron and uploaded onto Inna's YouTube channel on 24 November 2011 to positive response. It was connected to the International Day for the Elimination of Violence against Women, which is observed on 25 November. The singer had also launched a foundation against domestic violence simultaneously with the video's release. She further promoted the recording through various live performances. Commercially, "Endless" reached the top ten in Romania and Slovakia.

== Background and composition ==
"Endless"
A 23-second sample of "Endless", a flamenco–influenced mid-tempo club-ballad featuring acoustic and Spanish guitar as instrumentation.

"Endless" was written and produced by Romanian trio Play & Win members Sebastian Barac, Radu Bolfea and Marcel Botezan. It was picked as the fourth single from her second studio album, I Am the Club Rocker, on 25 November 2011. Record label Do It Yourself sent the single to Italian radio stations on 2 December. A 24-remix digital extended play (EP) was eventually made available for digital download on 10 January 2012 by Ultra Records.

A mid-tempo "club-ballad", "Endless" features an acoustic and Spanish guitar in its instrumentation. Jon O'Brien from AllMusic labelled the track — along with her previous single "Un Momento" (2011) — as "summery flamenco-tinged", and wrote that it "provide[s] the necessary Mediterranean 'booze cruise' vibes". Kevin Apaza from Direct Lyrics stated: "'Endless' is not your typical Inna party-ready tune, but one in which she shows her more vulnerable side, in a mellow synth production [...] which creates a really nice care-free atmosphere."

== Reception and accolades ==
Music critics met the single with generally favorable reviews. German magazine Laut writer Kai Butterweck pointed out "Endless" as one of the highlights on I Am the Club Rocker, calling it "slightly spherical". Similarly, an editor from German radio station BB Radio wrote: "[...] one of the most extraordinary titles on the album. Very spherical − it is particularly noticeable that even the acoustic guitar in the background sounds as if it was from another world." Although favoring the recording, Direct Lyrics's Apaza did not feel it would be commercially successful in European markets. Both Apaza and Jonathan Hamard from Pure Charts called it a good and "intelligent" single release for the fall–winter period. A Musique Radio editor saw "Endless" as "efficient" and a "future hit" resembling her past material, while Pro FM listed the recording in their list of "16 hits with which Inna made history". "Endless" won Best Song in the Balkans from Romania for 2011 at the 2011 Balkan Music Awards, with Inna also receiving a nod for herself in the Best Female Artist in the Balkans for 2011 category.

Upon its release, "Endless" entered several European record charts. In the Commonwealth of Independent States, the song debuted at number 255 on 12 November, reaching its peak position at number 181 on 26 November 2011. On the Romanian Top 100, the track peaked at number five in the week ending 12 February 2012, marking Inna's sixth top ten single in Romania, as well as her first in over one year. "Endless" also reached number nine in the radio charts of Slovakia and number 51 in Czech Republic, while peaking at positions 22 and 42 on the Wallonian Dance and Ultratip component charts, respectively.

== Music video ==
An accompanying music video for "Endless" was shot by Alex Herron, whom Inna had previously collaborated with for "Sun Is Up" (2010), "Club Rocker" (2011) and "Un Momento" (2011). It was uploaded onto her YouTube channel on 24 November 2011 as a contribution to the International Day for the Elimination of Violence against Women on 25 November. Her Bring the Sun in My Life foundation was also launched, which enabled female victims of domestic violence to be counseled by campaign partners in Europe to find solutions to their situations in order to live without physical suffering and psychological trauma.

The video portrays Inna being verbally abused by her love interest, who aggressively argues in the background while she stares at the camera. Other scenes show her in bed with her partner, singing in front of a sunrise and performing subtle movements in a look used for the single's cover artwork. Towards the end of the visual — after what appears to be a scene of physical abuse — Inna rejects the man's attempt at minimising and reconciling, resulting in him taking his coat to leave.

Reviewers regarded the music video positively. Pure Charts's Hamard called the clip "eye-catching", concluding that it highlights Inna's body image. Similarly, a Musique Radio editor said that the visual used the singer's image "advantageously". Apaza from Direct Lyrics saw it as a simple video with "lots of sensual poses" and close-up shots. A UTV writer called the clip "interesting", while suggesting that it was inspired by Barbadian singer Rihanna's "Man Down" (2011) music video.

== Live performances ==
As part of her "Wow Session" series on YouTube, Inna performed the song in a setting similar to her "Wow" (2012) music video on 27 March 2012. She also delivered a live performance of "Endless" at the World Trade Center Mexico City in September 2012 along with other material from I Am the Club Rocker. In 2016, the singer performed a stripped-down version of the song in the same location and sang the track at festival Alba Fest held in Alba Iulia, Romania. On both occasions, the singer additionally sung a cover version of Justin Bieber's "Love Yourself" (2015).

== Track listing ==
- Digital remixes EP
1. "Endless" (Radio Edit) – 3:14
2. "Endless" (Pulphouse Remix) – 4:50
3. "Endless" (Audiodish Remix) – 5:54
4. "Endless" (Diakar Remixxx) – 4:00
5. "Endless" (DJ Turtle & Beenie Becker Remix) – 4:33
6. "Endless" (Pat Farell Remix) – 5:31
7. "Endless" (Phonk d'Or Mix) – 4:26
8. "Endless" (Pulserockers Remix) – 5:04
9. "Endless" (Slickers ReMix) – 4:06
10. "Endless" (Speak One Reworked Radio Edit) – 3:28
11. "Endless" (Speak One Reworked Extended Club Mix) – 5:30
12. "Endless" (Speak One Reworked Radio Edit – Instrumental) – 3:26
13. "Endless" (The Thin Red Club Mix) – 5:30
14. "Endless" (Yvan Kay Radio Edit Next Gen Remix) – 3:56
15. "Endless" (Yvan Kay Extended Next Gen Remix) – 4:56
16. "Endless" (Yvan Kay Factory Rmx) – 4:54
17. "Endless" (Yvan Kay The Rock Rules Remix) – 3:37
18. "Endless" (Zampa Remix) – 6:31
19. "Endless" (Zampa Tools Mix) – 6:05
20. "Endless" (Timmy Rise & Barrington Lawrence Remix) – 5:59
21. "Endless" (Ramy BlaZin Remix) – 6:44
22. "Endless" (Adi Sina Remix) – 5:41
23. "Endless" (LuKone Remix Radio Cut) – 3:36
24. "Endless" (LuKone Remix Extended) – 6:15

== Charts ==
Chart (2011–12)	Peak position
Belgium (Ultratip Bubbling Under Wallonia)	22
Belgium Dance (Ultratop Wallonia)	42
CIS (Tophit)	181
Czech Republic (Rádio – Top 100)	51
Romania (Romanian Top 100)	5
Slovakia (Rádio Top 100)	9
