= First Cut =

First Cut may refer to:

- First Cut (UK TV series), a British series of documentaries
- First Cut (U.S. TV series), an American medical drama series on The CW Television Network, retitled Emily Owens, M.D.
- "The First Cut" (Rugrats episode), a 1998 television episode
- First Cut (album), 2000 album by Mai Kuraki
- The First Cut – The Immediate Anthology, 2001 album by P.P. Arnold
- Vacancy 2: The First Cut, 2008 American film
- Caedmon's Song, also known as The First Cut, 1990 novel by Peter Robinson
- Neighboring Sounds (band), formerly known as The First Cut, an indie band from Bergen, Norway
- First cut (golf), type of grass on a golf course between the fairway and the main rough

== See also ==
- Rough cut, the first cut of a film
- First haircut
- The First Cut Is the Deepest (disambiguation)
