= Alex Herron =

Norwegian music video director and photographer

- Born: Alex Herron
- Occupations: Director, photographer
- Website: alexherron.comelementfilm.net

Alex Herron is a Norwegian director and photographer. He has directed over 100 music videos and has also been a jury in Alarmprisen.

Herron was presented with the Spellemannprisen award for Margaret Berger's music video of "Lifetime Guarantee", and nominated for the same award, Spellemannprisen for best music video, 6 years in a row. In 2022, he directed two horror films called Leave and Dark Windows.

== Videography ==
=== Music videos ===
List of directed music videos and artists
Title	Year	Artist	Ref.
"Century"	2003	Erik Faber	
"Keep It Cool"	2005	Paperboys	
"Samantha"	2006	Margaret Berger	
"Hands"	2006	The Raconteurs	
"Now You're Gone"	2007	Basshunter feat. DJ Mental Theo's Bazzheadz	
"All I Ever Wanted"	2008	Basshunter	
"Angel in the Night"	2008	Basshunter	
"I Miss You"	2008	Basshunter	
"Every Morning"	2009	Basshunter	
"I Promised Myself"	2009	Basshunter	
"Break Your Heart"	2010	Taio Cruz	
"Dirty Picture"	2010	Taio Cruz feat. Kesha	
"Saturday"	2010	Basshunter	
"Dynamite"	2010	Taio Cruz	
"Written in the Stars"	2010	Tinie Tempah feat. Eric Turner	
"Sun Is Up"	2010	Inna	
"Radio"	2010	Alesha	
"Higher"	2010	Taio Cruz feat. Kylie Minogue	
"Telling the World"	2011	Taio Cruz	
"Club Rocker"	2011	Inna	
"Un Momento"	2011	Inna feat. Juan Magán	
"Endless"	2011	Inna	
"Look Back"	2012	Tone Damli	
"Northern Light"	2012	Basshunter	
"There She Goes"	2012	Taio Cruz feat. Pitbull	
"Dare You"	2014	Hardwell feat. Matthew Koma	
"Lullaby"	2014	Professor Green feat. Tori Kelly	
"Little Secrets"	2014	Professor Green feat. Mr. Probz	
"Come and Get It"	2015	John Newman	
"Tiring Game"	2015	John Newman feat. Charlie Wilson	
"Hard to Get"	2017	Sivert Tinius	
"Domino"	2018	Saara Aalto	

=== Films ===
List of directed films
Title	Year	Ref.
Leave	2022	
Dark Windows	2022	
