= Sun Is Up =

2010 single by Inna

Single by Inna

from the album Hot (Note: "Sun Is Up" was present on several limited editions of Hot, including the British, Australian and French editions.) and I Am the Club Rocker
- Released: October 2010
- Genre: Europop; Rave
- Length: 3:44
- Label: Roton
- Songwriters: Sebastian Barac; Radu Bolfea; Marcel Botezan
- Producers: Barac; Bolfea; Botezan

Inna singles chronology
"10 Minutes" (2010)	"Sun Is Up" (2010)	"Club Rocker" (2011)

"Sun Is Up" is a song recorded by Romanian singer Inna for her second studio album, I Am the Club Rocker (2011), and also included on several versions of her debut album Hot (2009). Written and produced by Play & Win members Sebastian Barac, Radu Bolfea and Marcel Botezan, the song was released in October 2010 as the first single from I Am the Club Rocker. "Sun Is Up" is a rave pop track, and was compared to Sabrina's "Boys (Summertime Love)" (1987) by one reviewer.

The track was received favorably, with music critics praising its composition and referring to it as a highlight on the album and in Inna's career. It won in the Best Song in the Balkans from Romania for 2010 category at the 2011 Balkan Music Awards, while also receiving nominations at the 2011 Radio România Actualităţi and Romanian Music Awards, and 2012 Radar Media Awards. To promote "Sun Is Up", an accompanying music video was shot by Alex Herron in late August 2010 in Marbella, Spain, and uploaded onto Inna's YouTube channel on 30 September 2010. She further promoted the recording through various live performances. Commercially, "Sun Is Up" reached the top 10 in several countries, while awarded certifications in Italy, Switzerland and the United Kingdom.

== Background and composition ==
"Sun Is Up"
A 23-second of "Sun Is Up", a rave pop song. A portion of the refrain is also showcased, with a reviewer noting she was screaming during that part.

In June 2010, Inna announced via her official website that two new songs, "Un Momento", a collaboration with Spanish singer Juan Magán, and "Sun Is Up", would be featured on an upcoming "Summer Hit Pack". With the plans remaining unmaterialized, "Sun Is Up" was released in Romania in October 2010 as the first single from the singer's second studio album, I Am the Club Rocker (2011). Its cover artwork had been previously unveiled in August 2010; shot by Edward Aninaru, it shows Inna naked in a jacuzzi, lifting her right hand. The French radio and digital release of the song followed in January 2011, the latter by label Roton. In the United Kingdom, the track was featured on the British version of Inna's debut record Hot, made available on 5 June 2011. It was also the closing song on the compilation Now That's What I Call Music! 79.

A "Euro rave pop" song, "Sun Is Up" was written and produced by Romanian trio Play & Win members Sebastian Barac, Radu Bolfea and Marcel Botezan. During the track's refrain, Inna sings: "All the people tonight put your hands in the sky / Come on boy, come and get in / The rhythm music will take you high / What I'm feeling about you / I love you, don't know why / Everybody come and get in / The rhythm music will take you high."

== Reception and accolades ==
Upon its release, "Sun Is Up" was met with generally positive reviews from music critics. An editor from German radio station BB Radio commended the song as a highlight from I Am the Club Rocker, writing: "After just the first few seconds, the sun rises. The hit single from Inna simply puts you in a dance mood." Paul Lester, writing for The Guardian, noticed similarities to Sabrina's "Boys (Summertime Love)" (1987), while French website Musique Radio praised its rhythm and melody. An editor of Pro FM listed the recording in their list of "16 hits with which Inna made history". More negatively, Urban.ro noted that the singer was screaming during the song's chorus. Fans of "Sun Is Up" include British group One Direction, who released a video of them on social media in January 2012 dancing and singing along to the track in their car while on their Up All Night Tour (2011–2012). In an accompanying message, they wrote: "Just incase you were wondering...this is what we do in the car...". An editor of Capital FM positively regarded the video, while resuming its plot: "While Louis and Zayn show off their best moves, Harry then turns the camera onto Liam Payne, who is doing some head bopping."

Commercially, "Sun Is Up" experienced widespread success on record charts, reaching number one on Hungary's Dance Top 40 chart, Netherlands's Mega Dance Top 30 chart, the Swiss Romandy region and United Kingdom's dance chart. In Romania, the track peaked at number two, while becoming the fifth Inna song to debut within the top 10 in France, ultimately reaching the same peak position. Other top 10 positions were achieved in the Commonwealth of Independent States, Switzerland, Billboard's Dance/Mix Show Airplay component chart in the United States, Mexico and Lebanon. "Sun Is Up" was awarded Gold certifications by the Federazione Industria Musicale Italiana (FIMI) and the International Federation of the Phonographic Industry (IFPI) for shifting 15,000 copies in Italy and Switzerland, while also receiving Silver by the British Phonographic Industry (BPI) in the United Kingdom for 200,000 units.

"Sun Is Up" won the Eurodanceweb Award in 2010, an online music contest, with 184 points, marking Romania's highest position in that competition. She was ranked in third place by the online voting, but she won following the decision of a jury panel consisting of various journalists, music producers, disc jockeys and radio stations. The single also won Best Song in the Balkans from Romania for 2010 at the 2011 Balkan Music Awards, while receiving nominations in the Pop/Dance Song of the Year, Best Dance and Song of the Year categories at the 2011 Radio România Actualităţi and Romanian Music Awards, and 2012 Radar Media Awards, respectively.

== Music video ==
An accompanying music video for "Sun Is Up" was uploaded onto Inna's official YouTube channel on 30 September 2010, preceded by the release of a making-of video on 30 August and a preview on 27 September 2010. It was filmed by Alex Herron in Marbella, Spain on 24 August 2010. The video begins with Inna walking cross a river in the middle of a forest, dressed up in green. This is followed by her getting ready for a photoshooting session with Tore Frisholm Jr. with various make-up artists. Subsequently, Inna is shown bathing and singing naked in a jacuzzi in front of a mountain area, as well as dancing at a party and being pictured by Frisholm privately. The clip continues in a similar way, closing with Frisholm and Inna standing close to each other at sunset. The visual received notable airplay on Romanian television, peaking at number four on Media Forest's TV Airplay Chart in October 2010.

== Live performances ==
The first live performance of "Sun Is Up" occurred at the 2010 Romanian Music Awards on 10 July 2010 in Craiova, Romania, in a medley with "Señorita" (2010), "10 Minutes" (2010) and "Amazing" (2009). In 2011, Inna sang the song on several occasions, including as the opening act of her own Inna: Live la Arenele Romane gig in Bucharest on 17 May, where she arrived by helicopter "like a diva", at the 2011 Balkan Music Awards on 4 June, and at the ZDF-Fernsehgarten and The Dome 59 in Germany on 28 August and 31 August. She also performed the song at the 2011 Romanian Music Awards in Brașov on 16 September, and at French event Starfloor on 26 November at the Palais Omnisports de Paris-Bercy in Paris. Other notable performances outside of the single's promotion phase include during her Wow Session series on her YouTube channel on 16 March 2012, and at the World Trade Center Mexico City in September 2012 and March 2016.

== Track listings ==
- Official versions (Note: This acts as a summary of all versions of the single found on I Am the Club Rocker and its digital and CD releases.)
1. "Sun Is Up" (Play & Win Radio Edit Version) – 3:44
2. "Sun Is Up" (Play & Win Extended Version) – 4:43
3. "Sun Is Up" (UK Radio Edit Version) – 2:32
4. "Sun Is Up" (Radio/Video Edit Version) – 3:11
5. "Sun Is Up" (Cahill Radio Edit) – 3:25
6. "Sun Is Up" (Cahill Club Remix) – 7:17
7. "Sun Is Up" (Cahill Instrumental) – 7:11
8. "Sun Is Up" (Kryder Remix) – 5:30
9. "Sun Is Up" (Mico Short Radio Edit) – 3:27
10. "Sun Is Up" (Mico Club Remix) – 6:05
11. "Sun Is Up" (Odd Radio Edit) – 3:17
12. "Sun Is Up" (Odd Club Remix) – 6:02
13. "Sun Is Up" (The Perez Brothers Radio Edit) – 3:48
14. "Sun Is Up" (The Perez Brothers Club Remix) – 4:18
15. "Sun Is Up" (Dandeej Remix) – 7:02
16. "Sun Is Up" (Ilario Estevez Remix) – 5:32
17. "Sun Is Up" (Liam Keegan Remix) – 2:59
18. "Sun Is Up" (Ivan Mateluna Empo Hybrid Remix) – 4:47

== Charts ==
=== Weekly charts ===
Weekly chart performance for "Sun Is Up"
Chart (2010–2011)	Peak position
Austria (Ö3 Austria Top 40)	33
Belgium (Ultratop 50 Flanders)	17
Belgium Dance (Ultratop Flanders)	11
Belgium (Ultratop 50 Wallonia)	5
Belgium Dance (Ultratop Wallonia)	3
CIS Airplay (TopHit)	3
Czech Republic Airplay (ČNS IFPI)	31
Euro Digital Songs (Billboard)	19
France (SNEP)	2
Germany (GfK)	26
Global Dance Songs (Billboard)	11
Greece (IFPI Greece)	88
Hungary (Dance Top 40)	6
Ireland (IRMA)	38
Italy (FIMI)	30
Lebanon (OLT20)	9
Mexico Ingles Airplay (Billboard)	5
Netherlands (Dutch Top 40)	9
Netherlands (Mega Dance Top 30)	1
Netherlands (Single Top 100)	7
Poland (Dance Top 50)	15
Romania (Romanian Top 100)	2
Russia Airplay (TopHit)	1
Scotland Singles (OCC)	13
Slovakia Airplay (ČNS IFPI)	20
Spain (Promusicae)	22
Sweden (Sverigetopplistan)	49
Switzerland (Schweizer Hitparade)	3
Switzerland (Media Control Romandy)	1
UK Singles (OCC)	15
UK Dance (OCC)	5
Ukraine Airplay (TopHit)	29
US Dance/Mix Show Airplay (Billboard)	4

=== Year-end charts ===
2010 year-end chart performance for "Sun Is Up"
Chart (2010)	Position
CIS (TopHit)	101
Hungary (Dance Top 40)	39
Romania (Romanian Top 100)	52
Russia Airplay (TopHit)	79

2011 year-end chart performance for "Sun Is Up"
Chart (2011)	Position
Belgium (Ultratop 50 Wallonia)	28
CIS (TopHit)	56
France (SNEP)	9
Germany (Official German Charts)	96
Hungary (Dance Top 40)	25
Netherlands (Dutch Top 40)	32
Netherlands (Single Top 100)	43
Poland (Dance Top 50)	36
Russia Airplay (TopHit)	21
Switzerland (Schweizer Hitparade)	35
UK Singles (Official Charts Company)	127
US Dance/Mix Show Airplay (Billboard)	34

2012 year-end chart performance for "Sun Is Up"
Chart (2012)	Position
Russia Airplay (TopHit)	187

== Certifications ==
Certifications and sales for "Sun Is Up"
Region	Certification	Certified units/sales
Italy (FIMI)	Gold	15,000^{*}
Switzerland (IFPI Switzerland)	Gold	15,000^{^}
United Kingdom (BPI)	Gold	400,000^{‡}
^{*} Sales figures based on certification alone.^{^} Shipments figures based on certification alone.^{‡} Sales+streaming figures based on certification alone.

== Release and radio history ==
Release dates and formats for "Sun Is Up"
Region	Date	Format	Label
Romania	October 2010	—N/a	—N/a
France	January 2011	Radio airplay	—N/a
France	10 January 2011	Digital download	Roton
France	28 February 2011	CD single	Airplay
Germany	27 May 2011	CD single	UMG
United States	8 February 2011	Digital download	Ultra
United States	N/A 2011	Promotional CD single	Ultra
United Kingdom	8 February 2011	Digital download	Ultra
United Kingdom	N/A 2011	Promotional CD single	3Beat
Italy	3 March 2011	Digital download	DIY
Italy	N/A 2011	Enhanced CD	DIY

== See also ==
- List of music released by Romanian artists that has charted in major music markets
