= I Am the Club Rocker =

Studio album by Inna
- Released: 19 September 2011
- Genre: Europop; dance-pop; techno; house
- Length: 45:33
- Language: English; Spanish
- Label: Roton
- Producer: Play & Win; Juan Magán

Inna chronology
Hot (2009)	I Am the Club Rocker (2011)	Party Never Ends (2013)

Alternative covers
- Japanese standard edition

Singles from I Am the Club Rocker
- 1. "Sun Is Up" Released: October 2010; 2. "Club Rocker" Released: 30 May 2011; 3. "Un Momento" Released: 18 July 2011; 4. "Endless" Released: 25 November 2011; 5. "Wow" Released: 20 April 2012

I Am the Club Rocker is the second studio album recorded by Romanian singer Inna, released on 19 September 2011 by Roton as a follow-up to her 2009 album, Hot. The complete production and writing process for the record was handled by Play & Win, with Juan Magán providing additional production for the album's opener, "Un Momento". Initially rumoured to be titled Powerless, the release of the album led to Inna encouraging her worldwide fanbase to affirm themselves as "Club Rockers". I Am the Club Rocker was described as a Europop, dance-pop, techno and house record, with the singer's vocals being processed with Auto-Tune.

Music critics gave the record mixed reviews, praising the harmony of its material but also criticizing it for being repetitive. Commercially, I Am the Club Rocker experienced success in selected countries, peaking at number eight in Mexico and within the top 30 in Czech Republic, Belgium and France. It was certified Gold by the Polish Society of the Phonographic Industry (ZPAV) for selling 10,000 copies in Poland, and was also named one of the best albums of 2011 by Inna's label Roton, alongside Wounded Rhymes (2011) by Lykke Li and Christmas (2011) by Michael Bublé. It was nominated for Best Album at the 2012 Romanian Music Awards.

To promote I Am the Club Rocker, Inna released five tracks from the album as singles. Its lead single "Sun Is Up" (2010) reached various European charts and was awarded certifications in Italy, Switzerland and the United Kingdom. The follow-up singles, "Club Rocker" (2011), "Un Momento" (2011), "Endless" (2011) and "Wow" (2012), were moderately successful, with the latter two peaking within the top 10 in Romania. For further promotion of the record, Inna embarked on her I Am the Club Rocker Tour (2011–2012).

== Background and composition ==
"It is very easy to work with an artist such as Inna, because feeling her presence in the studio is always a source of inspiration for us. We thank God for the inspiration, and we are sure that this is our best record so far. This time we come with new elements in order to improve the sound, and the message is a goad for all those who feel young and those who are always ready for fun. Our expectations are very huge and we hope to outperform ourselves this time."

—Play & Win during an Evenimentul Zilei interview.

Inna announced that the album was finished in late 2010, with it rumoured to be titled Powerless. With the release of the record, Inna encouraged her fanbase to affirm themselves as "Club Rockers". The singer also described I Am the Club Rocker as the record that "describes [her] the best". The entire writing and producing process for the album was handled by Play & Win at their studios located in Bucharest and Constanţa, Romania, while Juan Magán provided additional production for its opener "Un Momento".

The artwork for the album was produced during a photo shoot which remains the most expensive one to be ever developed in Romania, with the total costs amounting to €15,000. It was shot by Edward Aninaru at the Media Pro Pictures studios in Buftea. Over 50 male and female models were featured in the shooting, which consisted of two different images — an uncensored one leaked onto the internet and the photograph used to commercialize the album. The artwork portrays Inna standing in the center of a background with semi-nude models wearing a red-black suit, long boots and a French-like bun.

The album was described as a Europop, dance-pop, techno and house record, with it being reminiscent of balearic beats and kaleidoscopic synths. Inna's vocals are prominently processed with Auto-Tune. I Am the Club Rocker was influenced by several subgenres, including flamenco ("Un Momento" and "Endless") and italo house ("No Limit" and "House Is Going On"). German online magazine Laut noticed the use of offbeat-keyboards throughout some recordings, while the news agency Teleschau described the album's instrumentation as "synth-heavy".

== Reception and accolades ==
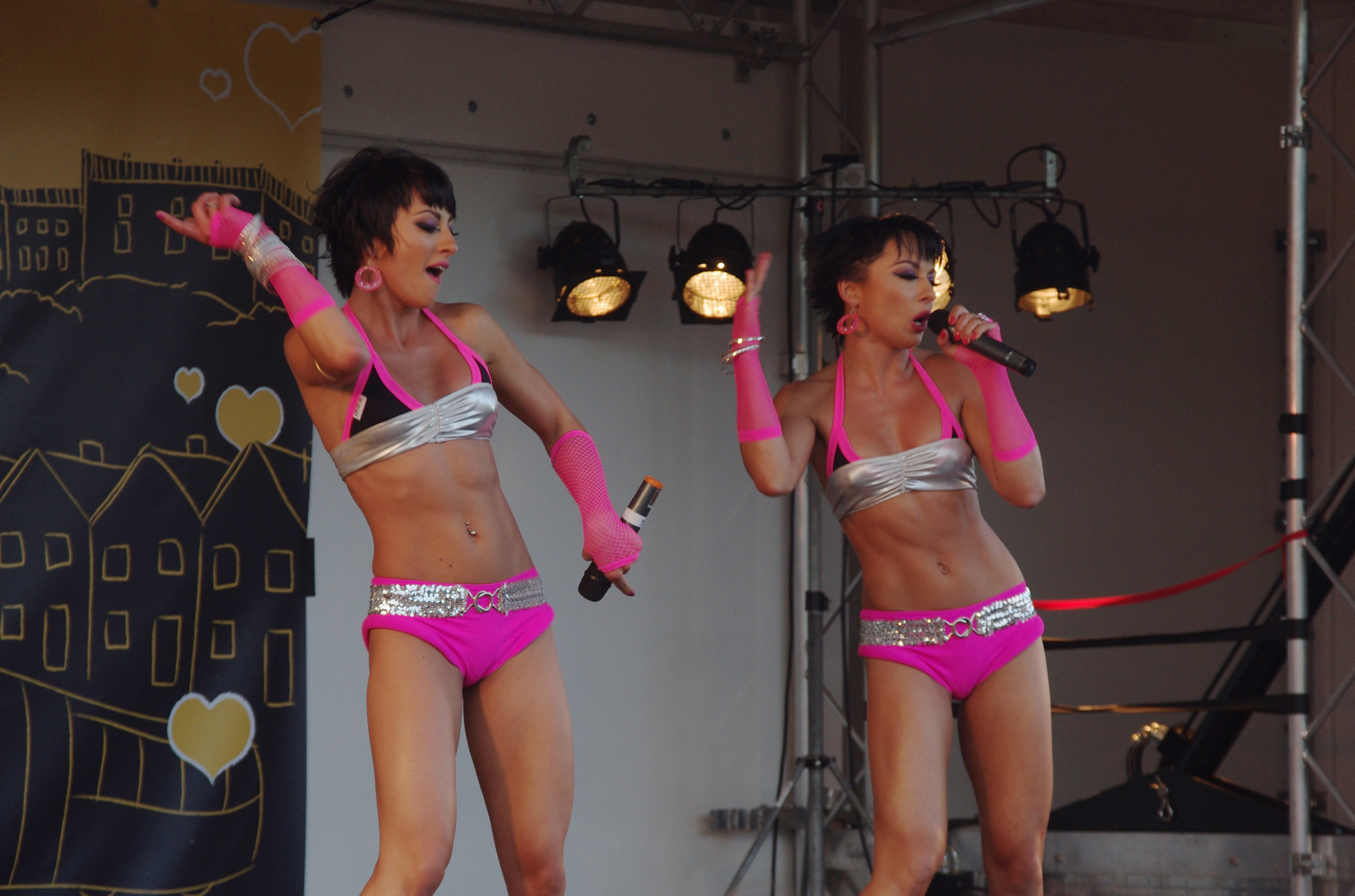
AllMusic writer Jon O'Brien asserted that I Am the Club Rocker had been the first major Romanian contribution to the pop music industry since the work of girl band The Cheeky Girls (pictured).

Upon its release, I Am the Club Rocker experienced commercial success in Mexico. It debuted at number 53 on the Mexican Albums Chart issued for 26 September 2011 and climbed up 45 positions to number eight by the following week, surpassing her debut studio album, Hot (2009), which peaked at number 54 in March 2011. In Poland, I Am the Club Rocker was certified Gold by the Polish Society of the Phonographic Industry (ZPAV) for selling 10,000 copies in the country. The record also peaked within the top 30 of the French Albums Chart; it managed to open at number 23 with around 10,000 in first-week sales, and lasted for a few other weeks within the top 100. As of August 2012, the record had sold 15,000 units in France. I Am the Club Rocker marked Inna's first top 50 album in Japan, where it reached its peak position at number 45 and sold 7,691 copies as of October 2011.

Professional ratings
Review scores
Source	Rating
AllMusic	2.5/5 stars

Music critics met the record with mixed reviews. German radio station BB Radio praised the "harmonious and compatible" way Inna's songs fit together on the record. They also commended the "incredibly danceable and upbeat disco sound" and found that she remained true to her style. Special praise was reserved for "Endless", as the station considered the song a standout track compared to the album's other material. However, Kai Butterweck, a writer for online German magazine Laut, gave I Am the Club Rocker a negative review, commenting that "the scheme is the same in nearly all the songs: galloping offbeat-keyboards first meet with innovation loose beats, ere Inna's thin vocal organ moves the next three or four minutes on almost the same pitch". He further described the songs' rhymes as being "cobbled together from a sixth graders' dictionary". Anna Julia Höhr, writing for the news agency Teleschau, similarly criticized the album, saying that the singer's tunes sound "all the same" and evaluating the record as "disappointing". AllMusic's Jon O'Brien rated I Am the Club Rocker with two-and-a-half out of five stars, describing its songs as "sun-soaked Europop tracks that appear destined to blare out of various Club 18-30 hotspots until the inevitable 6-a.m. stagger back to the hotel". He also criticized the use of Auto-Tune throughout the record and noticed major similarities between the album track "Moon Girl" and Katy Perry's "California Gurls" (2010). O'Brien went on say that Inna "is going to have to change the record quickly if she wants to avoid the novelty-act fate of her homeland's formerly most famous pop export", asserting that I Am the Club Rocker was the first Romanian major contribution to the international pop music industry after the work of girl band The Cheeky Girls. At the 2012 Romanian Music Awards. the record was nominated in the Best Album category, failing to win.

== Singles and promotion ==
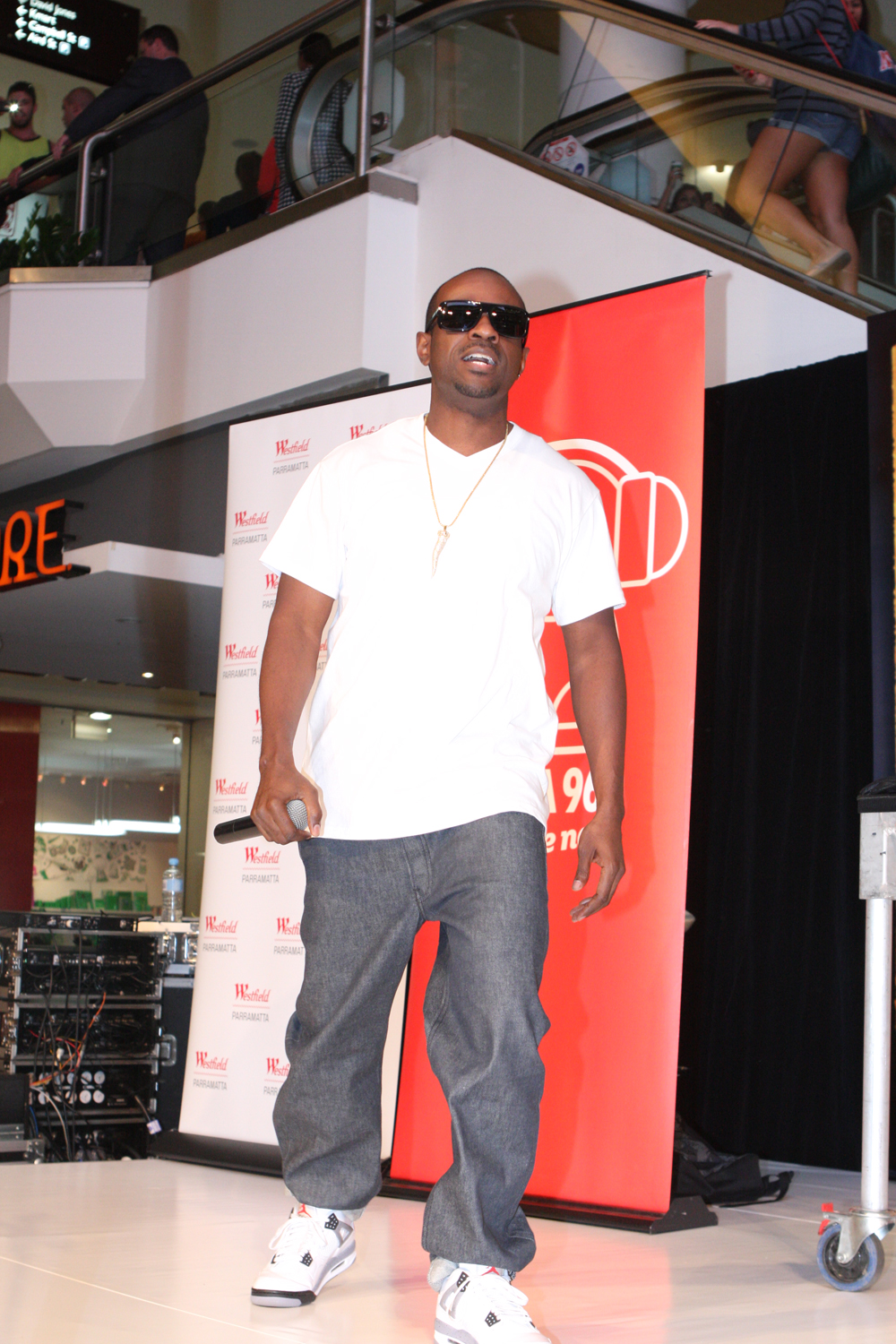
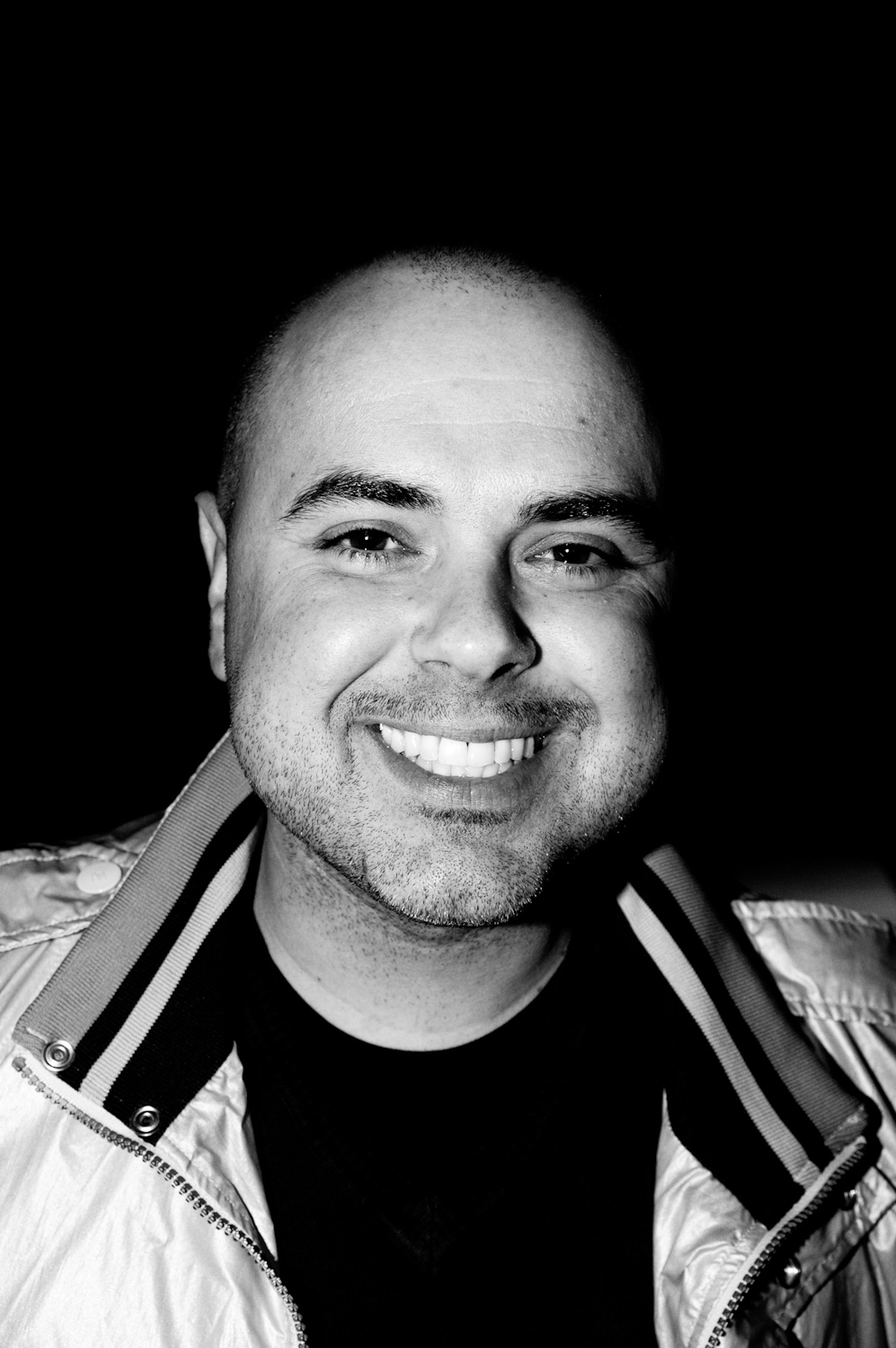
Flo Rida (left) and Juan Magán (right) were credited as featured artists on a remix of "Club Rocker" and on "Un Momento", respectively.

"Sun is Up" (2010) was released as the lead single from I Am the Club Rocker to widespread commercial success, reaching number one in Bulgaria, number two in both Romania and France, and number three in Switzerland and Russia. It was also certified Gold in both Italy and Switzerland, and Silver in the United Kingdom. The follow-up single "Club Rocker" (2011) — featuring the collaboration of American hip hop artist Flo Rida on a remix — reached the top 40 in France, Czech Republic, and Slovakia. Spanish performer Juan Magán provided collaborative vocals on "Un Momento" (2011), which was released as the third single from the album and charted within the top 10 in Turkey and Slovakia.

On 25 November 2011, "Endless" was released as the album's fourth single. In the track's accompanying music video, Inna portrayed a woman being verbally and physically abused by her partner in connection with the International Day for the Elimination of Violence against Women observed on 25 November, and the singer's Bring the Sun In My Life foundation. Commercially, "Endless" reached the top 10 in her native country and Slovakia. The album's last single, "Wow" (2012), was released to moderate commercial success. Its music references multiple fairy tales and animated movies.

For the album track "Put Your Hands Up", an online video was exclusively uploaded onto Inna's YouTube channel in September 2011, featuring moments from her concerts in Europe. Four promotional singles were also released from I Am the Club Rocker: "July", "No Limit", "Señorita" and "Moon Girl". The latter's cover artwork sparked controversy and was compared to American singer Beyoncé's image in her video for "Why Don't You Love Me" (2010). For further promotion of the record, Inna embarked on her I Am the Club Rocker Tour (2011–2012), which visited Europe and the United States. During her appearance in Mexico, she notably gave multiple television and radio interviews.

== Track listing ==
Credits adapted from the liner notes of I Am the Club Rocker. All songs were written and produced by Play & Win members Sebastian Barac, Radu Bolfea and Marcel Botezan, except additional production by Magán on "Un Momento".

I Am the Club Rocker – international version (Note: Different versions of I Am the Club Rocker were released for the Polish, French, Belgian, Mexican and Japanese markets, with them featuring modified track lists, bonus tracks and remixes.) (Note: Only selected versions of the album feature the remix of "Club Rocker" with Flo Rida, such as the one issued in Luxembourg.)
No.	Title	Length
1.	"Un Momento" (featuring Juan Magán)	3:23
2.	"Club Rocker"	3:34
3.	"House Is Going On"	3:16
4.	"Endless"	3:14
5.	"Sun Is Up"	3:43
6.	"Wow"	3:09
7.	"Señorita"	3:16
8.	"We're Going in the Club"	3:14
9.	"July"	3:55
10.	"No Limit"	3:25
11.	"Put Your Hands Up"	3:30
12.	"Moon Girl"	3:33
13.	"Club Rocker" (Play & Win remix)	4:05
Total length:		45:33

Sample credits

- "Club Rocker" contains elements from the Seight recording "Bass Attitude", written and produced by Seight.

== Charts ==
=== Weekly charts ===
Chart (2011–12)	Peak position
Belgian Heatseeker Albums (Ultratop Flanders)	2
Belgian Albums (Ultratop Wallonia)	15
Czech Albums (ČNS IFPI)	12
French Albums (SNEP)	23
Japanese Albums (Oricon)	45
Mexican Albums (Top 100 Mexico)	8
Swiss Romandy Albums (Media Control Romandy)	41

=== Year-end charts ===
Chart (2011)	Position
French Albums (SNEP)	195
Mexican Albums (Top 100 Mexico)	99

== Certifications and sales ==
Region	Certification	Certified units/sales
France (SNEP)	—	15,000
Japan (RIAJ)	—	7,691
Poland (ZPAV)	Gold	10,000^{*}
^{*} Sales figures based on certification alone.

== Release history ==
Region	Date	Format	Label	Edition
Italy	19 September 2011	Digital download	Roton	Standard
Canada	27 September 2011	Digital download	Roton	Standard
Canada	19 March 2013	CD	Sony	Standard
Germany	23 September 2011	CD	Rodeo Media	Standard
Ireland	27 September 2011	Digital download	Roton	Standard
United Kingdom	27 September 2011	Digital download	Roton	Standard
United States	27 September 2011	Digital download	Roton	Standard
Poland	30 September 2011	Digital download	Magic	Standard
France	24 October 2011	CD	Universal	Standard
Chile	7 November 2011	Digital download	Roton	Standard
Hungary	7 November 2011	Digital download	Roton	Standard
Kenya	7 November 2011	Digital download	Roton	Standard
Macau	7 November 2011	Digital download	Roton	Standard
Moldova	7 November 2011	Digital download	Roton	Standard
Peru	7 November 2011	Digital download	Roton	Standard
Portugal	7 November 2011	Digital download	Roton	Standard
Romania	7 November 2011	Digital download	Roton	Standard
Australia	11 February 2012	Digital download	Central Station	Standard
New Zealand	11 February 2012	Digital download	Central Station	Standard
Japan	11 July 2012	CD	Warner	Standard
Sweden	11 July 2012	CD	Warner	Standard
Mexico	25 September 2012	Digital download	Mas Label / Empo	Standard
Mexico	25 September 2012	Digital download	Mas Label / Empo	Deluxe

== See also ==
- List of music released by Romanian artists that has charted in major music markets
