= Un Momento =

Single by Inna featuring Juan Magán

from the album I Am the Club Rocker
- Released: July 18, 2011
- Genre: Electropop; Latin house
- Length: 3:24
- Label: Roton
- Songwriters: Sebastian Barac; Radu Bolfea; Marcel Botezan
- Producers: Barac; Bolfea; Botezan; Juan Magán

Inna singles chronology
"Club Rocker" (2011)	"Un Momento" (2011)	"Endless" (2011)

"Un Momento" is a song recorded by Romanian singer Inna featuring Spanish singer and rapper Juan Magán. It was released as the third single from her second studio album, I Am the Club Rocker (2011), on 18 July 2011. The track was written and produced by Play & Win members Sebastian Barac, Radu Bolfea and Marcel Botezan, along with additional production from Magán. "Un Momento" has been described as flamenco–influenced, with acoustic guitar instrumentation. The recording is bilingual, with lyrics written in both English and Spanish language.

The track was received favorably, with music critics praising its catchiness and summery style. To promote "Un Momento", an accompanying music video was shot by Alex Herron in late July 2011 and uploaded onto Inna's YouTube channel on 9 August 2011 to positive responses. She further promoted the recording through live performances, including two at the World Trade Center Mexico City in 2012 and 2016. Commercially, "Un Momento" reached the top 20 in Slovakia, Turkey and Romania.

== Background and composition ==
"Un Momento"
A 24-second sample of "Un Momento", a "summery flamenco-tinged" song containing an acoustic guitar in its instrumentation.

In June 2010, Inna announced via her official website that two new songs, "Un Momento", in collaboration with Spanish singer Juan Magán, and "Sun Is Up", would be featured on an upcoming "Summer Hit Pack". With the plans remaining unmaterialized, the singer later confirmed that "Un Momento" would be included as a bonus track on the Spanish edition of her debut studio album Hot (2009), which was ultimately released on 28 September 2010 in that region. The song was also featured on the British version of the record, made available on 5 June 2011.

"Un Momento" was digitally released on 18 July 2011 by Roton as the third single from Inna's second studio album I Am the Club Rocker (2011). It was written and produced by Romanian trio Play & Win members Sebastian Barac, Radu Bolfea and Marcel Botezan, along with additional production from Magán. Jon O'Brien from AllMusic labelled the track — along with her single "Endless" (2011) — as "summery flamenco-tinged", and wrote that it "provide[s] the necessary Mediterranean 'booze cruise' vibes". "Un Momento" includes an acoustic guitar in its instrumentation, which gives a "summer flair" to the song, while the lyrics are written in both English and Spanish.

== Reception ==
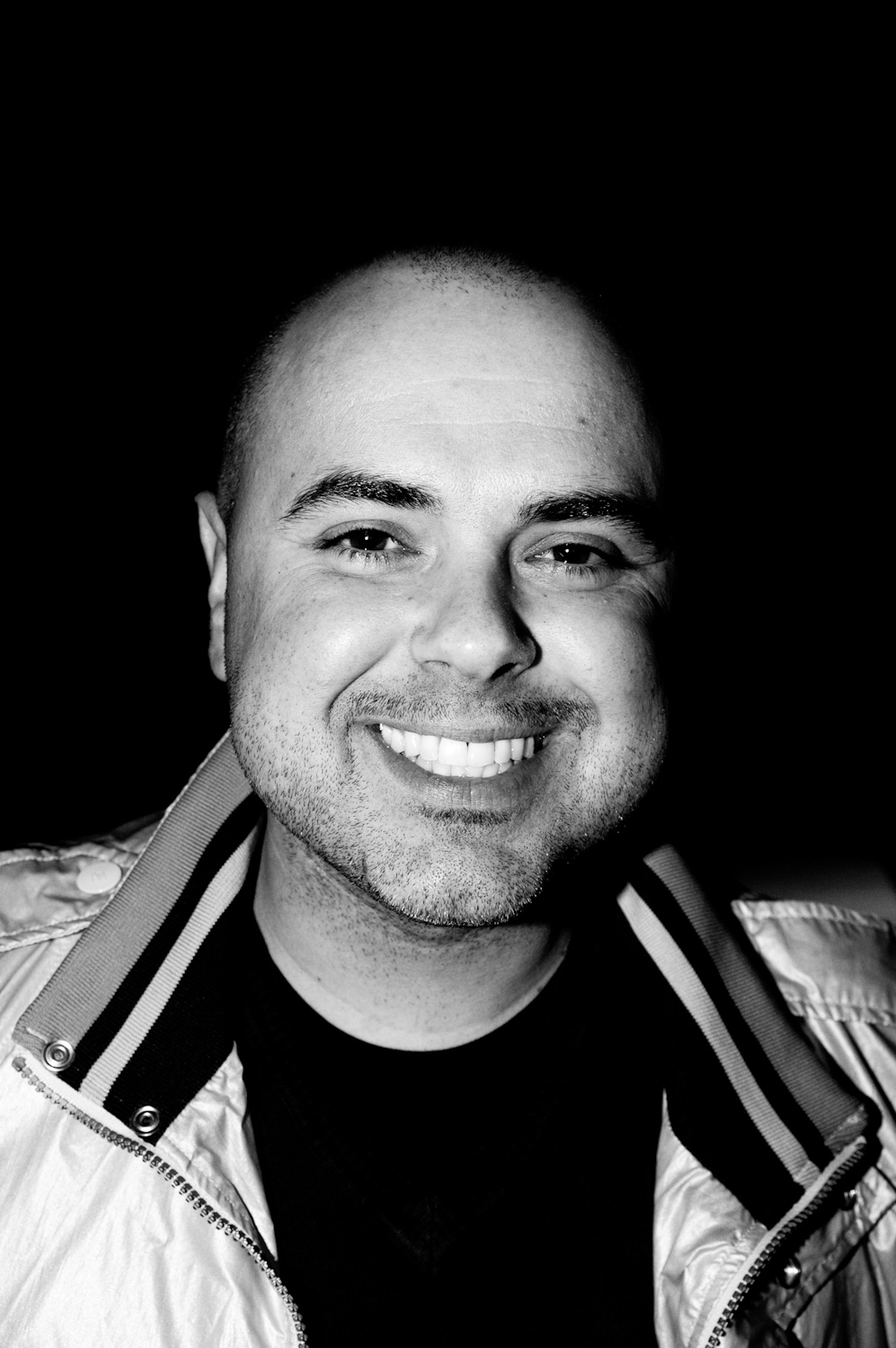
"Un Momento" features collaborative guest vocals by Spanish rapper and singer Juan Magán.

Music critics gave positive reviews of the song. Anna Julia Höhr, writing for the news agency Teleschau, commended "Un Momento" along with "Déjà Vu" (2009) and "Inna Mega Mix" from the German edition of I Am the Club Rocker. Kevin Apaza from Direct Lyrics called the song "electronic, magnetic, sensual" in reference to one of its lyrics and commended the production. He further praised the choice to release the track during summer and wrote: "Everytime I hear the song, I can't help getting happy". Pure Charts's Jonathan Hamard suggested that the "dancefloor title" would surpass the commercial performance of its predecessor "Club Rocker" (2011) and praised the recording's catchiness: "Simple, cheerful, festive, so many arguments that will make vacationers want to re-listen to this very summery title!"

Commercially, the song experienced moderate success on record charts. It peaked at number ten and four in Turkey and Slovakia, respectively, while remaining Inna's highest-charting single in the latter country. "Un Momento" further reached the top 30 in Romania and Billboard's Mexico Espanol Airplay component chart. On France's SNEP chart, the recording rose from position 99 to 45, aided by the release of its parent album I Am the Club Rocker; it later peaked at number 42. Other top 50 placements were achieved in Spain and the Polish Dance Top 50.

== Promotion and music video ==
As part of her "Rock the Roof" series on her YouTube channel, the singer performed "Un Momento" on the roof of a building in Mexico City on 22 April 2012. She also delivered a live performance of the song at the World Trade Center Mexico City in September 2012 along with other material from I Am the Club Rocker, and in 2016 in the same location. An accompanying music video for "Un Momento" was shot by Alex Herron in late July 2011 — with whom Inna had previously collaborated on her "Sun Is Up" (2010) and "Club Rocker" visuals — in Palma de Mallorca, Spain, with Martin Coppen acting as the director of photography. It was uploaded onto the singer's YouTube channel on 9 August, preceded by the release of a teaser on 3 August 2011.

In the opening scene of the video, Inna drives a car and stops on the brick of a road to let the male next to her urinate, but ultimately leaves without him. Subsequently, the singer enters a room and watches various photographs scattered on a bed along with three other females. As the clip, progresses, they are seen walking on the roads of Palma de Mallorca and interacting with people, riding bikes, residing on a yacht, taking photos, watching someone getting a tattoo reading "CLUB ROCKER", and making appearance at a party at night. At the end of the video, it is revealed that the aforementioned bed contains a sleeping man, which they wake up and throw the pictures at.

The music video was met with positive response from reviewers. Apaza, writing for Direct Lyrics, summarized the visual's plot: "[...] It basically sees Ms Inna having a blast in the island. She rides her convertible in the highway, walks the streets, hits the sea on a yacht, and finalizes the day in a Spanish fiesta!" Pure Charts's Hamard pointed out "yacht, sun, beach, pool and sexy look" as the video's "ingredients", positively comparing it to her previous material. An Eva.ro editor found that the "good and funny" clip was a good alternation to her "sexy" visual for "Club Rocker".

== Track listing ==
- Official versions
1. "Un Momento" (Play & Win 2011 Radio Edit) [feat. Juan Magán] – 3:24
2. "Un Momento" (Play & Win 2011 Radio Edit) – 3:23
3. "Un Momento" (Audiodish Remix) [feat. Juan Magán] – 5:50
4. "Un Momento" (Pulserockerz Remix) [feat. Juan Magán] – 4:10
5. "Un Momento" (Diakar Remixx) [feat. Juan Magán] – 3:41
6. "Un Momento" (Diakar Extended Remixx) [feat. Juan Magán] – 5:32
7. "Un Momento" (Tony Zampa Edit) [feat. Juan Magán] – 2:50
8. "Un Momento" (Tony Zampa Tools Mix) [feat. Juan Magán] – 7:24
9. "Un Momento" (Ivan Kay Old School Mix) [feat. Juan Magán] – 3:13
10. "Un Momento" (Ivan Kay Drill Mix Radio Edit) [feat. Juan Magán] – 3:31
11. "Un Momento" (Ivan Kay Extended Drill Mix) [feat. Juan Magán] – 4:45
12. "Un Momento" (JRMX Club) [feat. Juan Magán] – 7:56
13. "Un Momento" (JRMX Edit) [feat. Juan Magán] – 3:39
14. "Un Momento" (Timmy Rise & Barrington Lawrence Dirty Remix) [feat. Juan Magán] – 6:54

== Charts ==
=== Weekly charts ===
Chart (2010–11)	Peak position
Belgium (Ultratip Bubbling Under Flanders)	12
Belgium (Ultratop 50 Wallonia)	31
CIS (Tophit)	64
France (SNEP)	42
Italy (FIMI)	88
Mexico Espanol Airplay (Billboard)	29
Moldova (Moldova TV Airplay) Play & Win 2011 Radio Edit	10
Netherlands (Single Top 100)	98
Poland Dance (ZPAV)	48
Romania (Romanian Top 100)	12
Spain (Promusicae)	46
Slovakia Airplay (ČNS IFPI)	4
Turkey (Number One Top 20)	10

=== Year-end charts ===
Chart (2011)	Peak position
Romania (Romanian Top 100)	70

== Release history ==
Region	Date	Format	Label
France	18 July 2011	Digital download	Roton
France	N/A 2011	CD single	Airplay
Mexico	26 August 2011	Digital Download	Mas Label/ Empo
New Zealand	15 October 2011	Digital Download	Central Station
United Kingdom	23 October 2011	Digital Download	AATW

== See also ==
- List of music released by Romanian artists that has charted in major music markets
