= Wow (Inna song) =

Single by Inna

from the album I Am the Club Rocker
- Released: 20 April 2012
- Genre: Electropop
- Length: 3:09
- Label: DIY
- Songwriters: Sebastian Barac; Radu Bolfea; Marcel Botezan
- Producer: Play & Win

Inna singles chronology
"Endless" (2011)	"Wow" (2012)	"Caliente" (2012)

"Wow" is a song recorded by Romanian singer Inna for her second studio album, I Am the Club Rocker (2011). Written and produced by Play & Win members Sebastian Barac, Radu Bolfea and Marcel Botezan, it was made available for digital download on 20 April 2012 as the fifth single from the record through DIY Records. Musically, "Wow" is an electropop song.

An accompanying music video was shot by Edward Aninaru at MediaPro Studios in Buftea, Romania in January 2012. It was uploaded onto Inna's official YouTube channel on 5 April 2012 and references multiple fairy tales and animated movies, including The Wizard of Oz and Alice in Wonderland (1951). Music critics applauded the visual, praising its contemporary production. The song was nominated for Best Dance at the 2012 Romanian Music Awards. Commercially, "Wow" reached number 10 in Romania and position 171 in the Commonwealth of Independent States.

== Background and reception ==
"Wow"
A 23-second of "Wow". A Direct Lyrics editor described the single's genre as "sexy" electropop.

"Wow" was written and produced by Romanian trio Play & Win members Sebastian Barac, Radu Bolfea and Marcel Botezan. It was made available for digital download in Italy on 20 April 2012 by DIY Records; both the Italian and American digital releases featured multiple remixes alongside the original track. The accompanying cover artwork for "Wow" was shot by Edward Aninaru in a summer 2011 photo shooting session. Following its release to Romanian radio stations, "Wow" entered the nation's Airplay 100 chart at number 77 on 22 April, reaching number 10 on 10 June. On the Commonwealth of Independent States's Tophit chart, "Wow" debuted at number 216 on 28 April and reached number 171 on 19 May 2012. The song was nominated for Best Dance at the 2012 Romanian Music Awards.

== Music video ==
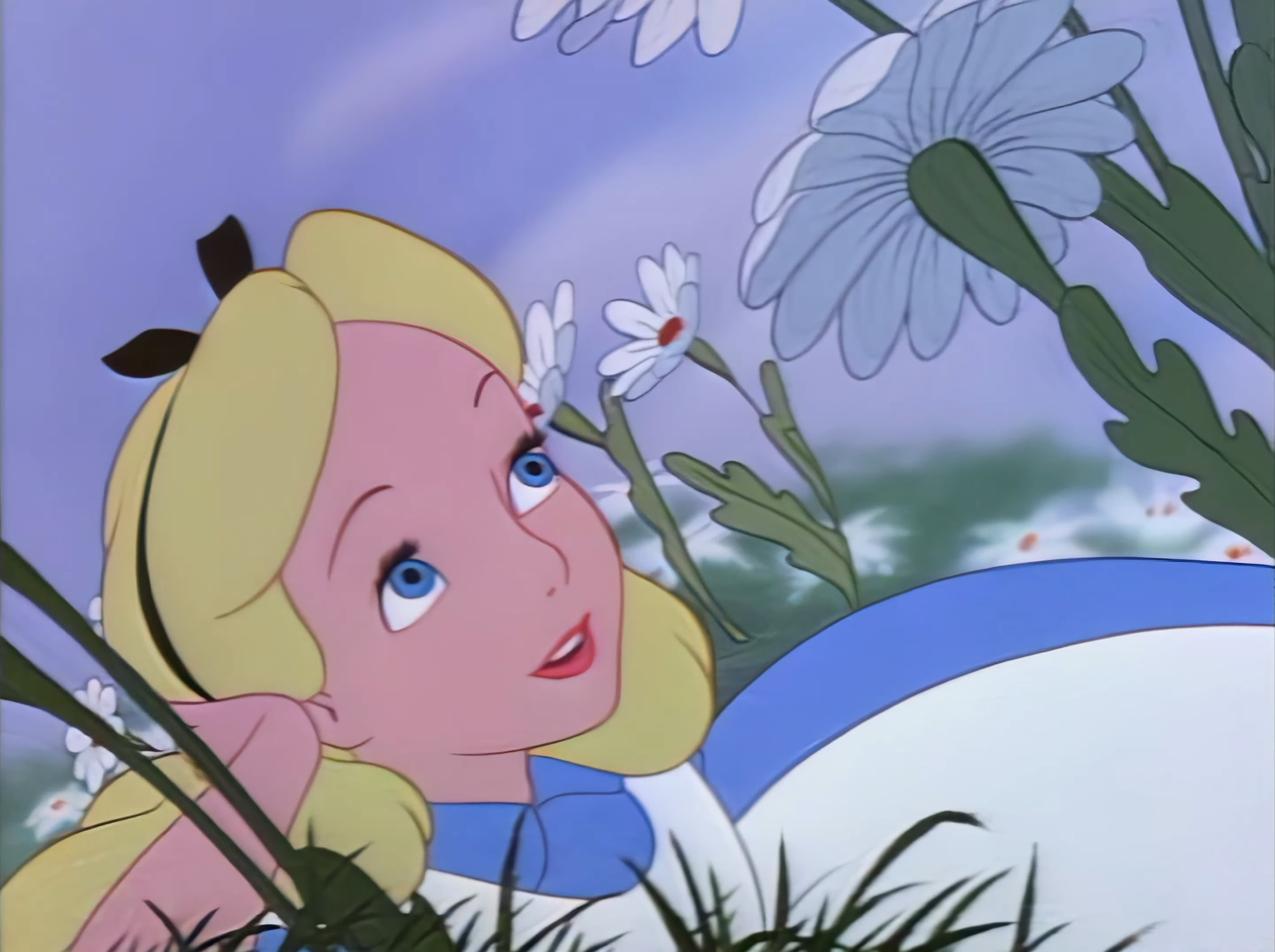
The music video for "Wow" references multiple fairy tales and movies, including Alice in Wonderland (1951).

An accompanying music video for "Wow" was shot by Aninaru at the MediaPro Studios in Buftea, Romania in January 2012, with whom Inna had previously collaborated for around 50 photo shootings at that time. According to the singer, Aninaru came with the idea of referencing multiple fairy tale characters — including Snow White and Dorothy Gale from The Wizard of Oz — in the visual, which she agreed to. The clip was uploaded onto Inna's YouTube channel on 5 April 2012, preceded by a preview lasting 23 seconds.

The music video — lasting for nearly five minutes — begins with Inna in a van driving to an animated beach setting along with other people; while on journey, they sing a stripped-down portion of "Wow". Following this, they exit the van and encounter other summary dressed people lying on a confetti ground. After being hit by a beach ball, Inna faints and is afterwards looked from above by people dressed in black-and-white outfits. As the music video progresses, the singer is shown dancing and performing to the song in various fairy tale settings, while encountering various characters. Scenes include her appearing oversized while inside a room, and her dancing on a table at an Alice in Wonderland–inspired meal with various characters in a background of champignons; she wears a Hatter–esqué hat. The clip ends with Inna performing a synchronized choreography with all characters before the screen turns black.

An Urban.ro editor praised the visual and its production, calling it "sexy". Schaap of Direct Lyrics saw the clip as "out there... to say the least", and labelled it as a mix between Alice in Wonderland, the 1971 American musical film Willy Wonka & the Chocolate Factory and American singer Gwen Stefani's "swagger and theme" in her visual for "What You Waiting For?" (2004). A writer from Utv.ro thought that the music video "has everything to be successful: it's very dinamic, full of color and it's hard to look away from the screen."

== Live performances ==
As part of her "Wow Session" series on YouTube, Inna performed the song in a setting similar to its music video on 3 March 2012 to celebrate five million fans on her Facebook page. Inna's vocal delivery and the live instrumentation received praise from an Urban.ro editor. She also delivered a live performance of "Wow" at the World Trade Center Mexico City in September 2012 along with other material from I Am the Club Rocker.

== Track listing ==
- Official versions (Note: This acts as a summary of all versions of the single found on its digital releases in Italy and the United States.)
1. "Wow" – 3:09
2. "Wow" (Radio Edit) – 3:09
3. "Wow" (Extended Version) – 4:37
4. "Wow" (Live Version) – 3:23
5. "Wow" (Casey & Moore vs. Sandro Bani Remix) – 6:02
6. "Wow" (Timmy Rise & Barrington Lawrence Remix) – 6:52
7. "Wow" (Beenie Becker Radio Edit) – 3:11
8. "Wow" (Beenie Becker Club Edit) – 4:41
9. "Wow" (Steve Roberts Radio Edit Remix) – 2:24
10. "Wow" (Steve Roberts Extended Remix) – 3:53
11. "Wow" (Starz Angels M***** F***** Radio Remix) – 3:46
12. "Wow" (Starz Angels M***** F***** Club Remix) – 6:16
13. "Wow" (Starz Angels M***** F***** Dub Remix) – 6:16
14. "Wow" (JRMX Edit) – 3:54
15. "Wow" (JRMX Club) – 7:37
16. "Wow" (JRMX Dub) – 7:38

== Charts ==
Chart (2012)	Peak position
CIS (Tophit)	171
Moldova (Moldova TV Airplay)	10
Romania (Airplay 100)	10

== Release history ==
Region	Date	Format	Label
Italy	20 April 2012	Digital download	DIY
Romania	26 April 2012	Digital download	Roton
United States	15 May 2012	Digital download	Ultra
