= The First Cut Is the Deepest (disambiguation) =

"The First Cut Is the Deepest" is a 1967 song by Cat Stevens, covered by many artists.

The First Cut Is the Deepest or First Cut Is the Deepest may also refer to:

- The First Cut Is the Deepest (album), an album by Michie Mee
- "The First Cut Is the Deepest" (Grey's Anatomy), a 2005 television episode
- "The First Cut Is the Deepest" (Entourage), a 2007 television episode
- "The First Cut Is the Deepest" (One Tree Hill), a 2004 television episode
- "First Cut Is the Deepest" (Kyle XY), a 2008 television episode
