= Johns Quijote =

Norwegian musical group

Johns Quijote is a band from Oslo, Norway, led by singer, guitarist and songwriter John Ivar Bye, released on the Sandvika-based Farmen music label.

Johns Quijote's music style is a smooth jazz, rock, cabaret and Tom Waits-esque music style, often described as 'adult, cultivated, and melancholy'.

Reviews of the JQ albums have been mixed, but he is a popular performer on the Oslo music scene.
