= Draumir =

- Origin: Norway
- Genres: Rock, folk rock
- Years active: 2004-
- Labels: Little Hill Records; Universal Music
- Website: www.draumir.com

Draumir is a Norwegian band playing a form of dark and melodic rock music.

== Members ==
- Jo Inge Johansen Frøytlog – Vocal, keys, guitar
- Alexandra Bråten – Vocal, organ, moog synthesizer, melodica.

== History ==
The core of the band is songwriter Frøytlog. He has gradually changed the line-up. The band has changed names three times, most recently in 2004 from “Mir” into today's “Draumir”.

In 2006, Draumir was nominated in the Norwegian music awards Spellemannprisen as the debut of the year, without winning. In February of that year, Draumir played at the by:Larm-festival in Tromsø. The concert led to a record contract with Universal Music Norway. During the following months, Draumir's second album, The Island, was composed, and was recorded between September and October 2006. It was released on March 26, 2007, and peaked at number 13 on the Norwegian Album Chart.

== Discography ==
- Frozen Moments/Seeking My Distance, 2005 (EP)
- Draumir, 2005 (album)
- The Island, 2007 (album)
- Beautiful Creatures, 2024 (single)
- Will You Stay?, 2024 (single)
