= Violet Scene =

Norwegian rock group

Violet Scene was a Norwegian rock group whose key members included Kjetil Bergseth (vocals/guitar), Jo Espen Bergseth (bass), Ralf Lofstad (guitar), Arvid Nordstrand (drums) and Asbjørn Risøy (guitar) between 1995 and 2000. Formed in Oslo, the band was influenced by 1980s alternative groups such as The Smiths and The Cure. The band gained moderate domestic success in Norway in the mid-to-late '90s with their sole album Pieces (1996) and an EP (1999), but has since gone on to become a cult band, especially in the American college/underground circuit.

The band was formed in the Oslo alternative rock scene, which in the mid-'90s was centered on famous rock club So What!. The band gained a solid reputation for their live performances, eventually opening for acts like Brainpool and Bluenotes.

However, the recording and post production of their self-produced album Pieces was ridden with personal and musical conflicts, especially between guitarist/producer Lofstad and guitarist/songwriter Risøy, which in the end caused Risøy to walk out just by the time of release. Pieces received favourable reviews in the capital press; the Aftenposten reviewer called it "reasonable English indie pop" and gave it a 4 out of 6. But sales suffered due to lack of promotion caused by the split with Risøy.

However, the band soldiered on, recruiting keyboardist Thor Mosaker and recording an EP in 1999 and continued gigging on a national tour of Norway. At the time they were described as playing "melancholy, but at the same time energetic and driving alternative rock." Unfortunately, further tensions within the band combined with Lofstad's dissatisfaction with main songwriter Kjetil Bergseth's new material caused the band to go on an indefinite hiatus in 2000. Lofstad, Jo Espen Bergseth and Nordstrand then went on to form Still Doing Sky with Fredrik Rødsæther, while Kjetil Bergseth concentrated on his progressive rock group Tammatoys.

== Members ==
- Kjetil Bergseth (vocals/guitar);
- Jo Espen Bergseth (bass);
- Ralf Lofstad (guitar);
- Arvid Nordstrand (drums);
- Asbjørn Risøy (guitar, 1995/96); and
- Thor Mosaker (keyboards, 1997–2000)

== Discography ==
- Pieces (1996)
- EP (EP) (1999)
