= Dråpe =

Norwegian band

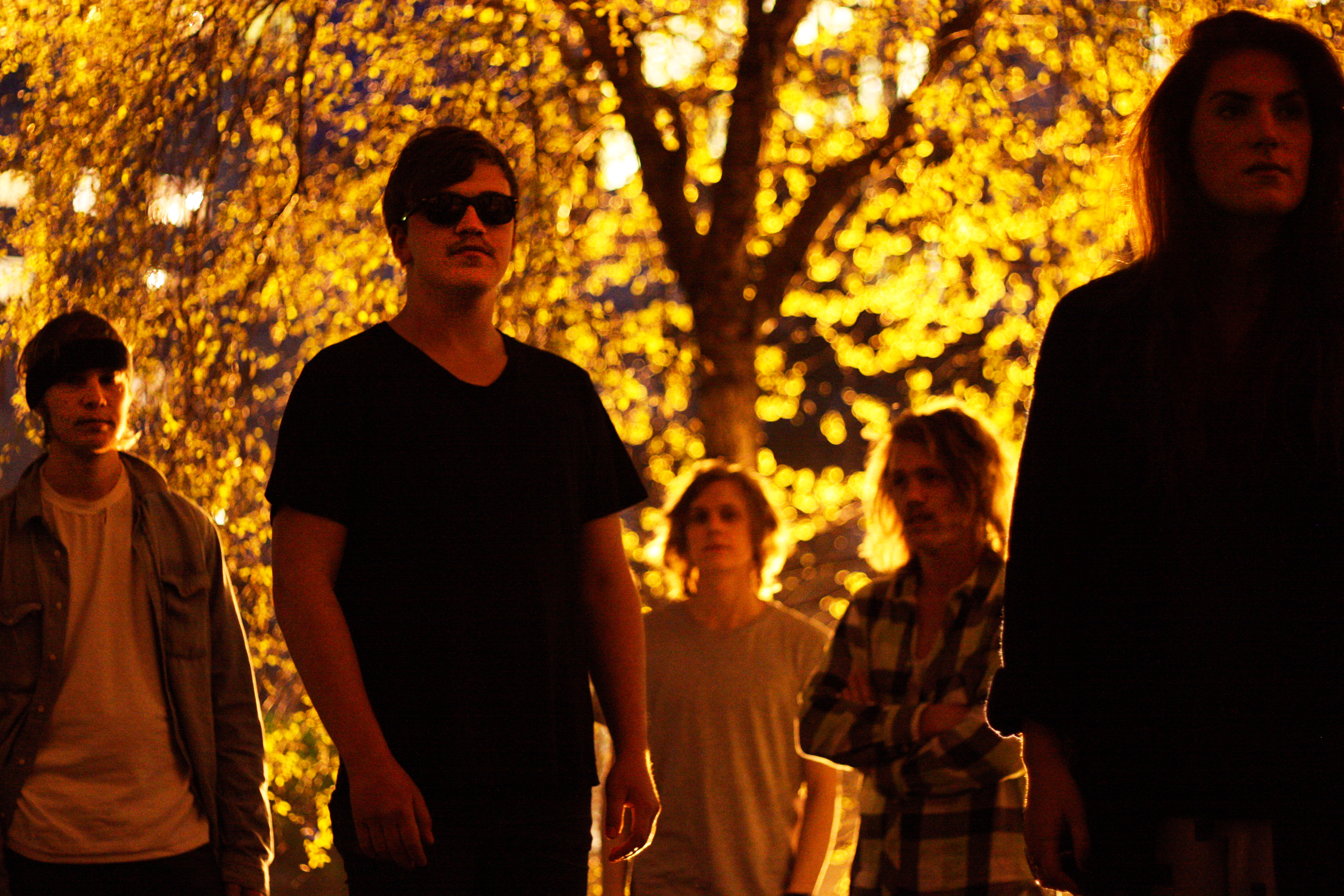
- Drape members

Background information
- Origin: Oslo, Norway
- Genres: Pop, indie pop
- Years active: Takk (2009-); Dråpe (2010-)
- Label: Riot Factory
- Members: Ketil Myhre; Eirik Kirkemyr; Lars Kristian Boquist; Even Hafnor; Hanne Olsen Solem
- Past members: Eirik Fidjeland; Peter Rasmussen Lubiana
- Website: www.draapemusic.tumblr.com

Dråpe ("drop"), formerly Takk, is a Norwegian shoegaze/noise pop band established in summer of 2010 in Oslo, Norway. The band signed its first record deal with Riot Factory in autumn 2011 and released its first EP Dråpe EP. In 2012 it made agreements with Danish and Japanese companies and released its debut album, Canicular Days on April 19, 2013. Dråpe have played several festivals in Norway as well as various missions abroad. They won the Norwegian Untouched award in October 2010.

== History ==
Dråpe, the Norwegian word for "Drop", was first formed in summer 2009 in Oslo, then named Takk, the Norwegian word for Thanks. Takk consisted of Eric Fidjeland, Ketil Myhre, Eirik Kirkemyr and Lars Kristian Boquist. The band has been compared with, among others, My Bloody Valentine, Sonic Youth, Radiohead and Deerhunter. In summer of 2010 the band was renamed to Dråpe and in October they were named Urørt artist by NRK P3. The band's first EP was released in autumn 2011 and was recorded at Greener Productions in the country in Trondheim . The EP was released by the record company Riot Factory. In 2011 Dråpe played the by:Larm in Oslo and they also played at several festivals in the summer of that year, including Hove Festival, Slottsfjell Festival, Øyafestivalen and Storåsfestivalen. The band's debut album was released on April 19, 2013. In 2012, Dråpe signed with the Japanese label Friends of Mine Records and another company, Donuts Pop promoting the band in the same country.

== Musical Signature ==
Dråpe's music was defined by NRK Urørt as "Noisepop that is both aggressive, soothing and soaring." The band defines its own genre as "indieshoegazepostrocknoise" which describes a mixed genre of indie, shoegaze, post-rock and noise pop. This genre composition is often explained as vague and dream friendly melodic noise. Shoegaze literally means to "look down at their shoes" and refers to a music style where musicians of the genre would often look down at their guitar pedals. The elements of post -rock in Dråpe is also compared with Sigur Ros. Drummer, Eric Kirkemyr, said in February 2011 he wanted to "provide an opportunity to daydream a little in the music, maybe feel a little bit again." Furthermore, he explained that the music is about having "no worries, but simply just be."

== Discography ==
- Dråpe EP (2011)
- Canicular Days (2013)
- Relax/Relapse (2015)
