= Robert Solheim =

Norwegian musician

Robert Solheim is an electronic music composer from Norway. His styles are techno and deep/tech-house, downtempo and electronica with a strong emphasis on Nordic sound. Influenced by all kinds of electronic music, he has developed his characteristic style from his first ambient and ambient-techno releases in the 1990s, through down tempo and deep/tech-house and techno for clubs and home entertainment.

== Biography ==
Solheim was born on Averøya, a small island on the west coast of Norway. He grew up between the sea, the mountains, and the music (his parents love the same art). He started to play the organ at a very young age. Later, Solheim played drums in a band until he discovered a synthesizer with the name Jupiter-8 and started to compose. Under the name CURRENT he has released several downtempo and ambient-techno albums on labels Origo Sound, a Norwegian label which also had Biosphere, Circular Circular and Erik Wøllo.

In 2005 he started releasing his material on his own label CURRENTMUSIK. All his releases have been called extraordinary creative works by the critics.

Lately his creativity has turned more towards electronic music for clubs and dance-floors with several deep/tech-house and dubby techno EPs release the last years.

Solheim has been participating in musical projects with other musicians. With the American composer Michael Snyder (Eidetaker) they formed AQUAVIT, a musical project who works on finding the harmonies between electronic and acoustic sounds. Their first and much anticipated work together, Telapatia, was released in 2008 applauded by critics and the public. Critics have said. “This is electronic music for the well travelled”. AQUAVIT later serves as a foundation for the Norwegian label AQUAVIT RECORDS, aimed to release quality electronic music without restrictions.

He has composed and produced the music for another musical project very different from all of the others, THE OPIATES, with the German singer Billie Ray Martin. An advance of the work was presented in a concert in the mythical shop Rough Trade in London in March 2008. With the event, they released a 10 inch vinyl with the title Anatomy of a plastic girl. An electronic concept on the darker side of Chicago-house and retro. The first single from the album, "Rainy Days and Remixes" was released in September 2011, including remixes by Kim Ann Foxman from Hercules and Love Affair, Chris & Cosey and XHK Stepford. The album Hollywood Under The Knife was released with a show at HMV in London October 17. The single and album had artwork from Turner Prize winner Wolfgang Tillmanns.

== Comments ==
Within Robert Solheim releases as CURRENT, the track 'Ghost Trip' from the album Communion (2003) was voted by the readers of the magazine E-dition, number 7 of the 100 best electronic tracks through time (amongst tracks by artists like Kraftwerk, New Order, Biosphere (musician) and David Sylvian). In 2006 his album underCURRENTs (released 2005) was voted “Best ambient album” and the track 'Waking up slowly', “Best ambient track” by Just Plain Folks Music Awards 2006. About the album Musik (2001) Bill Binkelman from the magazine Wind & Wire said “Musik is a veritable glossary/textbook of any number of current-day executions of electronica/EM”.

Anatomy of a plastic girl (The Opiates) was album of the month in countries like Sweden, Denmark and Norway. In March 2009, Candy Coated Crime (The Opiates), from the same album, has been released on Dj Hells (Gigolo Records) compilation Eleven. Dj Hell said about Candy Coated Crime: "it´s the bomb".

== Discography ==
Robert Solheim: Slow Bender Remixes digital EP (2013) Aquavit Records/Aquavit BEAT

Robert Solheim: Heretics Plus LP + remixes and bonus track (2012) Aquavit Records

Robert Solheim: Heretics LP (June 2012) Aquavit Records

Robert Solheim: Taking The Challenge Again VA Aquavit Records presents BlåRød 2 (May 2012) Aquavit Records

Robert Solheim: Syv & O Portiño digital EP (2012) Aquavit Records

Robert Solheim: Syv & O Portiño vinyl EP (2011) Aquavit Records

The Opiates : Hollywood Under The Knife / Hollywood Cuts (the remixes)' double CD and digital (2012) Disco Activisto

The Opiates : 'Hollywood Under The Knife CD and digital (2011) Disco Activisto

The Opiates : 'Rainy Days and Remixes' EP digital(2011) Disco Activisto

The Opiates : 'Anatomy of a plastic girl' EP 10” vinyl + digital(2008) Opiates Music/Kudos Records

Robert Solheim: Field Tripping EP digital (2011) Aquavit Records

Robert Solheim: Raveing Hangover EP digital (2010) Aquavit Records

Robert Solheim: Love & Vinyls EP (2010) Aquavit Records

Robert Solheim: Candle Flame digital (2010) V/A The Family Grows: Overflow Records

Baldo & Robert Solheim - The 12 hour EP digital (2010) Aquavit Records

Robert Solheim: Around 4 EP digital (2009) Aquavit Records

Aquavit: Telepatia CD and digital (2008) Eidetic Response Publishing/CurrentMusik

Current: The Dream Cabinet CD and digital (2006) CurrentMusik

Current: underCURRENTs CD and digital (2005) CurrentMusik

Current: Ghost Trip . CD and digital Single (2003) Origo Sound

Current: Communion CD and digital (2003) Origo Sound

Current: Musik CD and digital (2001) Origo Sound

Current: Enter the Dream CD and digital (1997) Origo Sound

=== Compilations ===
Robert Solheim:

Candle Flame (2010) The Family Grows, Overflow Records

Love & Vinyls (2010) Minimal Tech Femmes vol. 3. Club Femme

Love & Vinyls (2010) Disco Babes From Another Space vol. 2. Baccara France

Love & Vinyls (2010) Strange Clubbers vol. 1. Tokyo Women

Aquavit:

Vigor – Duende Mix (2008) Eden 2. Six Degrees Records

Granular Sea (2009) Canapes Lounge. Feiyr

Granular Sea (2010) Precious Lounge. Feiyr

Granular Sea (2009) Ibiza Bar Grooves vol. 5. San Trincha

Granular Sea (2009) Easy Listening vol. 4. San Trincha

The Opiates:

Candy Coated Crime (2009) Dj Hell’s Compilation Eleven. Gigolo Records

Anatomy of a Plastic Girl. (2008) Press R for Galaxy Bar. Klick Records

=== Current ===
Ghost Trip (radio edit) (2007) Planet Origo. Origo Sound

Stellar (2007) Planet Origo. Origo Sound

Intoxicated Dream (1994) Unsigned1. MP Records
