= Moyka (singer) =

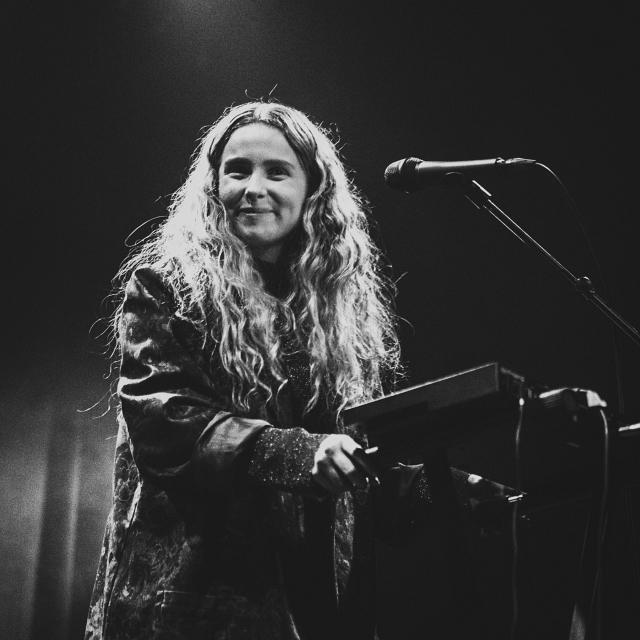
- Moyka performing in Norway, 2020

Background information
- Also known as: The Norwegian Pop Witch
- Born: 16 May 1997 (age 29); Norway
- Genres: Art pop; electropop; dance-pop; alternative pop; indie pop
- Occupations: Artist, Producer, Singer, Songwriter
- Years active: 2019–present
- Labels: SNAFU Records; Made Records
- Website: www.moykamusic.com

Monika Engeseth (born 16 May 1997), also known as Moyka, is a Norwegian singer and songwriter from Hallingdal, Norway.

She has called herself a "Norwegian Pop Witch". Her pop music has its own style but is influenced by other Norwegian singers such as Aurora or Sigrid, or bands like Highasakite or Röyksopp. She declares that developing her own "mystic universe", as do other artists like Lorde or Lykke Li according to her words, is something she always focuses on.

She started releasing songs under the European record label Made Records in 2019. In 2021, she signed with the Stockholm and Los Angeles based record label SNAFU Records.

== Early life ==
Engeseth grew up in a city located in Hallingdal Valley (eastern Norway) and always wanted to create music since a very young age. After starting to create music, she released her first songs through an EP named "Circles" after some months of work in 2019.

== Career ==
Her first EP named Circles included 5 songs and was released on 18 October 2019.

She started to become more recognized after performances on Norwegian national media, including NRK P3 radio and TV2 channel through "God Morgen Norge". She also performs at concerts across Norway and has sung at international music festivals.

She sang in January 2020 for the 34th edition of Eurosonic (Netherlands). In April 2020, during the COVID-19 crisis, she performed in the Verftet Online Music Festival, a Norwegian music festival gathering several artists that was fully virtual to avoid risk of contagion. In May, she was accepted to participate in The Great Escape Festival (2020 edition) in Brighton, but it was canceled due to the COVID-19 pandemic. Her second EP called Spaces was released on 12 June 2020, and included four new songs.

In 2021 she signed with record label SNAFU Records. In March 2021, Moyka released the double-sided single Stay and As Long As You're Here ("ALAYAH") as the first songs of her upcoming debut album. Her third work and debut album "The Revelations of Love" was released on 22 October 2021. The singer describes this album as a concept album turned about the different feelings of love; including both personal and fictional story songs. A physical version is made available in November 2022.

In January 2023, she announced being selected to participate to the inter-European Keychange musical event, co-founded by the EU's Creative Europe program and aimed to promote European artists thanks to showcases and conferences taking place around the world.

Since March 2023, Moyka released four singles out of her second studio album Movies, Cars & Heartbreak, which was released on 20 October 2023. According to Moyka, the album is meant for "the brokenhearted, the thrill-seekers and party-people - and for those who love to dance and cry at the same time." Following the album release, Moyka commenced her first Europe tour with concerts in Germany, Iceland, Norway, Switzerland and the United Kingdom between October 2023 and February 2024.

Moyka reached a new wave of international popularity in March 2024 after several of her songs were featured in the third and final season of Young Royals, a Swedish teen drama series produced by Netflix. The season features the two songs Lonely and Perfect Movie Scene of Moyka's second album Movies, Cars & Heartbreak and a remix of her 2021 single As Long As You're Here, which was used in the final scene of the last episode. The remix was produced as the music directors of the series expressed interest in an adapted version of the song for the series.

In September 2026, she announced a series of two international live tours following the reveal of her upcoming album Bullseye. The first one is called Latam Tour and is planned to take place through several Southern America countries at the fall of 2026. The other one, named after the album's title Bullseye Tour represents the second and bigger European tour of the artist, expected to start in February 2027.

== Discography ==
=== Albums ===
Title	Details
The Revelations of Love	Released: 22 October 2021; Label: Snafu Records; Format: Vinyl, digital download, streaming
Movies, Cars & Heartbreak	Released: 20 October 2023; Label: Gems; Format: Vinyl, digital download, streaming
Bullseye	Released: 16 October 2026; Label: ADA Nordics; Format: Vinyl, digital download, streaming

=== EPs ===
Title	Details
Circles	Released: 18 October 2019; Label: Made Records; Format: Digital download, streaming
Circles (Acoustic)	Released: 22 November 2019; Label: Made Records; Format: Digital download, streaming
Spaces	Released: 12 June 2020; Label: Made Records; Format: Digital download, streaming
Movies, Cars & Heartbreak (Heartbreak Edition)	Released: 15 November 2024; Label: Made Records, ADA Nordics; Format: Digital download, streaming
Ultraviolet	Released: 14 November 2025; Label: ADA Nordics; Format: Digital download, streaming

=== Singles ===
Title	Year	Peak chart positions	Album
Title	Year	NOR Air.	Album
"Bones"	2019	—	Circles
"All The Things We Forgot"	2019	—	Circles
"Circles"	2019	—	Circles
"Kanazawa (Maybe We Don't Have to Go There)"	2020	—	Spaces
"Backwards"	2020	—	Spaces
"Spaces"	2020	—	Spaces
"As Long As You're Here"	2021	18	The Revelations of Love
"Stay"	2021	—	The Revelations of Love
"I Don't Wanna Hold On"	2021	—	The Revelations of Love
"December (I Never Learn)"	2021	—	The Revelations of Love
"Illusion"	2021	—	The Revelations of Love
"Rear View"	2023	—	Movies, Cars & Heartbreak
"Already Gone"	2023	—	Movies, Cars & Heartbreak
"Don't Turn Around"	2023	—	Movies, Cars & Heartbreak
"Perfect Movie Scene"	2023	—	Movies, Cars & Heartbreak
"24/7"	2025	—	Bullseye (Note: "24/7", "Fluorescent" and "Headlights" are also included on the Ultraviolet EP.)
"Fluorescent"	2025	—	Bullseye
"Headlights"	2025	—	Bullseye
"Icarus"	2026	—	Bullseye
"Moon"	2026	—	Bullseye
"Villain of Your Story"	2026	—	Bullseye
"—" denotes singles that did not chart or were not released.
