= Jetsurfers =

Defunct Scandinavian pop band

- Origin: Oslo, Norway
- Genres: Americana, country, rock
- Years active: 1999–2008
- Labels: Grammofon AS Electra, Coco Pelli, One Stop Entertainment, Comstock, Perris, DWM Music Company, Musikkoperatørene
- Members: Bjørn Nilsen; Audun Norgaard; Ivar H. Johansen; Joachim Svendsen
- Past members: Vidar Fredsvik; Knut Carlsson; Lars Linkas; Cato Monrad; Ulf H. Aass; Torstein Elvestad
- Website: www.myspace.com/jetsurfers

Jetsurfers was a Norwegian band from Oslo. The band has released three studio albums, one live album and one compilation album.

== History ==
Thorstein Elvestad and Bjørn Nilsen founded Jetsurfers in 1999. Vidar Fredsvik og Knut Carlsson joined the band soon after. Their EP, Jetsurfers - Saloon, containing six tracks, were released by Coco Pelli Records the same year. Many of the band's gigs after that release were acoustic performances in prisons in the southern part of Norway.

Late 2000, their first studio album, Jetlagged in Jetland, were released at Grammofon AS Electra. The album got good reviews by Norwegian critics, and the songs were often played by radio stations all over Scandinavia. In May 2001, Carlsson was replaced by Audun Norgaard on bass. Lars Linkas replaced Vidar Fredsvik on guitar, early 2002.

Grammofon AS Electra released their second studio album, Wildcards, in 2002. Their song «Fireworks» became a hit for many radio stations, and the band received good critics once again. The record company did a poor job promoting the album, so it did not sell as much as their debut. In the middle of 2003, Jetsurfers played regularly at Muddy Waters in Oslo. They recorded the live album An Evening at Muddy Waters at this arena. The album sold well at their concerts and through their official web site.

Lars Linkas left the band early in 2004, and was replaced by Cato Monrad. Monrad joined just in time for recording of new songs, and celebrating of Jetsurfers' five-year anniversary. He was replaced by Ulf H. Aass later that year. One Stop Entertainment released their compilation album Five Years Down the Road in Norge in July 2005. The albumet included new recordings and remastered versions of previously released songs. The songs on this album got much attention on radio stations across Europe, because of a campaign done by Comstock Records (Arizona, US).

Jetsurfers has had a busy touring schedule over the years, playing over 500 gigs, even warming up for Mick Taylor, Johnny Winter, Hellbillies and Buddy Miller. They've also played a couple of Norwegian festivals. This busy schedule has made the band known as «one of Norway's greatest live bands». Perris Records and DWM Music Company distribute Jetsurfers' early records in the United States.

In 2007, Musikkoperatørene released Jetsurfers' final album, Western Reality. The band promoted the album by making appearances at Norwegian television.

== Influences ==
The band has mentioned Bob Dylan, The Rolling Stones, Johnny Cash, Georgia Satellites, The Allman Brothers Band and Steve Earle as their influences.

== Members ==
Last members

- Bjørn Nilsen – Vocals, guitar, harmonica, mandolin
- Audun Norgaard – Bass guitar, vocals
- Ivar H. Johansen – Drums, percussion, vocals
- Joachim Svendsen – Guitar, vocals

Former members

- Vidar Fredsvik – Guitar
- Knut Carlsson – Bass guitar
- Lars Linkas – Guitar
- Cato Monrad – Guitar
- Ulf H. Aass – Guitar
- Torstein Elvestad- Drums, percussion

== Discography ==
Studio albums

- Jetlagged in Jetland (2000)
- Wildcards (2002)
- Western Reality (2007)

Live albums

- An Evening at Muddy Waters (2003)

Compilations

- Five Years Down the Road (2005)

EPs

- Jetsurfers - Saloon (1999)
- Next of Kin (1999)

== See also ==
- Music of Norway
