= Steinar Karlsen =

Norwegian guitarist

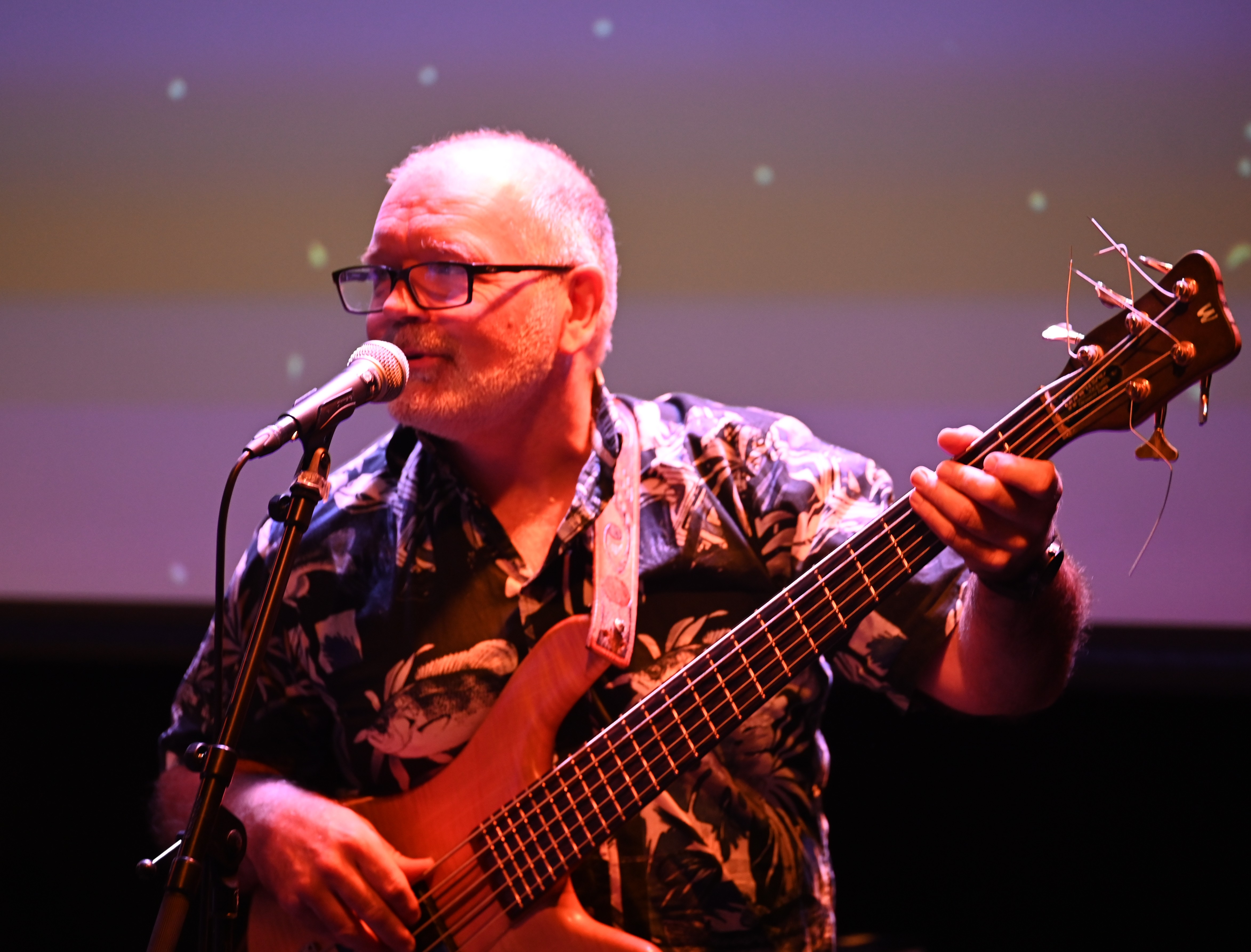
Steinar Karlsen in 2026

Steinar Karlsen is a Norwegian guitarist and composer of instrumental music with elements from folk music, rock, contemporary and jazz. He has released seven albums since 2011; his 2015 album Tur was called "one of the best instrumental releases of the year" by Vintage Guitar.

Karlsen is from Eikefjord, Norway. He is now living in Vangdal in Hardanger. Beside his solo career he also plays with the band Good Time Charlie (since 2003) and Hot Little Mama. Among his influences he cites Ry Cooder, Julian Lage, Béla Bartók, Terje Rypdal and Kenny Burrell.

== Discography ==
- Ulydium (2011)
- Hanens Død (2013)
- Tog til Sunnfjord (2015)
- Tur (2015)
- Destination Venus (2020)
- Eld (2022)
- Transitt (2023)
