= Her Royal Harness =

Norwegian singer

Her Royal Harness is the musical moniker of Helene Jæger, an alternative rock / pop singer-songwriter from Bergen, Norway. Jæger's music has been characterized by its melancholy lyrical world centering on themes of isolation and being lost, uniting the "ghosts of rock", Baroque Europe, dance music and gospel.

== Career ==
Jæger's debut album The Hunting Room (mixed with Justin Gerrish -Vampire Weekend, The Strokes) was released on independent label Manufacture in 2013, to critical acclaim. The Sunday Times called lead single 'Unseen' "brilliant" and UK music magazine The 405 called the album: "A dazzling and confident debut from a band who could find themselves among the leading lights of off-kilter pop". The album was also named "Best New Release" by Classic Pop Magazine and lead single 'Unseen' was hailed as "one of the year's most enjoyable songs" by US entertainment tastemaker The A.V. Club Several tracks were picked up by radio stations such as XFM in the UK and charted on CMJ, garnering the project an underground following.

In Norway, Her Royal Harness received a dice throw of 4 in Bergensavisen. Several aspects of the music were mesmerizing and caught the reviewer's attention, with the highlights being "Mercenary Man", "Colour Me" "I Can't Believe" and "Unseen". Other songs were not up to par, and the reviewer felt "entitled to expect more from Her Royal Harness".

Dagbladet gave a dice throw of 3 since the product felt premature. Contrary to the obvious ambitions to make "substantial pop music" with a breed of electropop, indie rock and synthpop, it was not executed well enough. The album had an undesirable lo-fi sound at times, and Jaeger used "deep, lesser dynamic voices" which did not blend in with the music. The songs "Mercenary Man", "I Can't Believe" and "Unseen" were the most promising.
