= Club Rocker =

- Remix cover artwork

Single by Inna or remix featuring Flo Rida

from the album I Am the Club Rocker
- Released: 30 May 2011
- Genre: Electropop
- Length: 3:34
- Label: Roton
- Songwriters: Sebastian Barac; Radu Bolfea; Marcel Botezan
- Producers: Barac; Bolfea; Botezan

Inna singles chronology
"Sun Is Up" (2010)	"Club Rocker" (2011)	"Un Momento" (2011)

Flo Rida singles chronology
"Where Them Girls At" (2011)	"Club Rocker" (2011)	"Good Feeling" (2011)

"Club Rocker" is a song recorded by Romanian singer Inna for her second studio album, I Am the Club Rocker (2011). The song was released on 30 May 2011, as the second single from the record; a remix version featuring American rapper Flo Rida was eventually made available. It was written and produced by Play & Win members Sebastian Barac, Radu Bolfea and Marcel Botezan. "Club Rocker" is a techno–influenced electropop song, with its lyrics revolving around celebrating and partying. The recording samples "Bass Atitude" (2010) by French disc jockey Seight.

The track was positively received, with music critics praising its catchiness and commercial appeal. In October 2014, "Club Rocker" was involved in a copyright infringement lawsuit, with Spanish singer Robert Ramirez Carrasco accusing Play & Win of plagiarism. To promote the recording, an accompanying music video was shot by Alex Herron and uploaded onto Inna's YouTube channel on 26 June 2011 to positive response. It was also nominated in the "Best Video" category at the 2012 Romanian Music Awards. The clip portrays Inna at an auto service center and taking part in a rally race. She further promoted the recording through live performances, including at the NRJ Music Tour and Starfloor in 2011, while appearing on several radio stations. Commercially, "Club Rocker" reached number four in Lebanon and peaked within the top 30 in multiple countries.

== Background and composition ==
"Club Rocker"
A 25-second sample of "Club Rocker", a techno–influenced electropop song. It uses a sample of "Bass Attitude" (2010) by French disc jockey Seight, showcased towards the end.

"Club Rocker" was digitally released on 30 May 2011 by Roton as the second single from Inna's second studio album I Am the Club Rocker (2011). A remix featuring American rapper Flo Rida was also eventually made available. An accompanying cover artwork was shot by Edward Aninaru, who called the session "a real deployment of forces". The track was written and produced by Romanian trio Play & Win members Sebastian Barac, Radu Bolfea and Marcel Botezan, and samples French disc jockey Seight's "Bass Attitude" (2010).

"Club Rocker" is an electropop song with "twisted techno riffs" and a "show–off production"; its "jerky" refrain is accompanied by "massive" electro beats. Lyrically, the track speaks about celebrating and partying. Jonathan Hamard from Pure Charts saw the recording as "much less stubborn" than her previous "Hot" (2008), "Amazing" (2009) and "Sun Is Up" (2010). In another article, the same editor compared "Club Rocker" to "the electro vein" of "Hot", but called it "more electric". Similarly, Jérémy B. of French website Melty wrote: "Definitely a sound for clubs [...]."

== Controversy ==
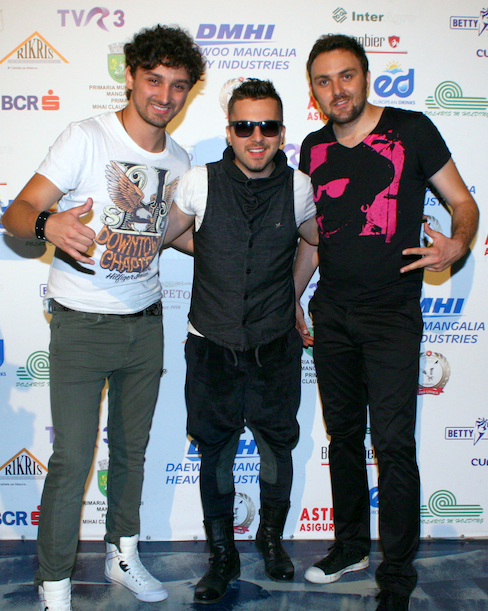
Play & Win, the composers of "Club Rocker", were involved in a copyright infringement lawsuit in 2014.

"Club Rocker" was involved in a copyright infringement lawsuit in October 2014, with Spanish singer Robert Ramirez Carrasco accusing its composers, Play & Win, of copying the key accords of his song "A Minute of Life" (2011). He also claimed that he lost critical contacts and had suffered of depression as a result, further wanting representatives of the Uniunea Compozitorilor și Muzicologilor din România (Union of Composers and Musicologists from Romania) to analyze the two recordings. Both composers Ionel Tudor and Horia Moculescu found major similarities. After reportedly failing to reach an agreement, Ramirez demanded a reported €227–300,000 in damages at the Tribunalul București (Bucharest Court). Inna's manager, Ștefan Lucian, negated the accusations: "The musical theme is not only used in several Play & Win songs, but also in other international records. Robert can not say he had copyright on this side." The singer itself also said: "Certainly the truth will be proven in court". In May 2018, after nearly four years, the court found Play & Win not liable of plagiarism and demanded fines of 91,000 lei from Ramirez.

== Critical reception ==
Music critics gave generally positive reviews of the recording. An editor writing for German radio station BB Radio commended "Club Rocker" as a highlight on I Am the Club Rocker. Similarly, Jon O'Brien from AllMusic positively noticed that the song deviated from the formulaic production on the album, but criticized Flo Rida's vocals as "phoned–in". An editor from Direct Lyrics praised the track's catchiness and energy, although "not as good as her previous stuff". Kevin Apaza from the same website was similarly positive towards "Club Rocker" and foresaw its commercial success, but likened the line: "She's moving like oh, oh oh" to "Who's That Chick?" (2010) by French disc jockey David Guetta and Barbadian singer Rihanna. Similar praise was outspoken by website Meltly: "Certainly, Inna will be the major artist of the summer and will crack the most delusional revelers." Based on the recording's success, Libertatea called Inna a "spokesman" of Romania. Pro FM listed "Club Rocker" in their list of "16 hits with which Inna made history".

== Commercial performance ==
Commercially, "Club Rocker" experienced moderate success on record charts. It excelled on both club and sales rankings in France, ultimately debuting at number 53 on the country's SNEP chart. After several weeks of moving up and down, the song climbed 67–32, reaching its peak position. On the Romanian Top 100, the recording opened at number 43 in July 2011 as that week's highest new entry. It peaked at number 42 the following edition, remaining her lowest–charting single in the country until the release of "Caliente" (2012). In early 2012, "Club Rocker" peaked at number 64 in Switzerland, while opening at position 14 in Austria. This remains Inna's highest–peaking and debuting single in the country, while also the highest opening for an Eastern European artist. In Germany, the track became the singer's fifth entry and reached number 55. "Club Rocker" further peaked within the top five in Lebanon, and the top 20 in Slovakia, Turkey and the Polish Dance Top 50.

== Music video ==
A shot of the music video, showcasing Inna residing in a huge human pyramid of people kissing and making out. A similar image was used for the packaging for I Am the Club Rocker.

An accompanying music video for "Club Rocker" was shot by Alex Herron — with whom the singer had already collaborated for her "Sun Is Up" (2010) visual — during the span of three days in Brașov and Bucharest, Romania. Maz Makhani acted as the director of photography, while a French team was hired. A special casting call for a role in the visual was drawn, with the winner to be determined after downloading Internet Explorer 9 and answering a few questions about Inna. One of the submitters was Romanian socialite and model Natalia Mateuţ, who however withdrew after learning that she would have had to appear barely dressed. The clip was uploaded onto Inna's YouTube channel on 26 June, preceded by the release of a 27−second teaser on 13 June 2011. Inna's solo version of "Club Rocker" was used for the visual.

The video opens with a few women fixing a car in an auto service center. This is followed by Inna emerging from a black car, wearing a black leather bolero, blue jeans and lace high−heel boots. She then appears tweeting on her phone to another service man ("Thomas11") and waves a tissue in front of the camera, following which the viewer is introduced to a rally race between Inna and the aforementioned man. The next scene is set inside the singer's car — driven by Mihai Leu — wearing a grey leather jacket. During the chorus, Inna changes her clothes accompanied by three other female background dancers in a darkened elevator. Sporting a black dress, the singer enters a party hall and sings to the song in front of a lion cage. Following this, Inna and various other back-up dancers are shown performing around and in a boxing ring. For the track's bridge, the singer is surrounded by multiple couples kissing in a huge human pyramid, while fireworks are blown out. Play & Win also have a cameo appearance playing a Yamaha keyboard surrounded by a partying crowd. In the video's final scene, Inna hooks up with "Thomas11", who had previously lost the race.

The clip was met with generally positive reviews. A Melty editor called the singer's outfits "quite free and crazy", and wrote: "Ready to reclaim the dancefloor, Inna preserves her festive and dancing spirit while her energy continues to make us move [...]." French portal Pure People felt that the video suited the song well and appealed to the male audience, while a Unica writer thought: "[...] a modern love story was created in a turbulent city." Direct Lyrics's Apaza criticized the music video as a "cheaper copy" of Rihanna's "Shut Up and Drive" (2007) visual. The visual received notable airplay on Polish television, where it peaked at number three on ZPAV's component video chart in September 2011. It was also nominated for "Best Video" at the 2012 Romanian Music Awards, but lost in favor of Romanian singer Andreea Bănică's "Sexy".

== Live performances ==
During the shooting for the music video of "Club Rocker", the singer uploaded a clip onto YouTube of her singing a capella portions of the song, which was praised by critics. Inna performed the single live for the first time during her Inna: Live la Arenele Romane gig in Bucharest on 17 May, while also appearing on NRJ in France and Europa FM in Romania to sing the song on 30 May and 17 June 2011, respectively. The singer also performed the track on 23 July during the NRJ Music Tour in Beirut and at the Starfloor on 26 November 2011 at the Palais Omnisports de Paris-Bercy in Paris. Other live performances of "Club Rocker" occurred during Inna's YouTube "Rock the Roof" series on the roof of a building in Paris on 22 December 2011, and at the World Trade Center Mexico City in September 2012 along with other material from I Am the Club Rocker.

== Track listing ==
- Official versions (Note: This acts as a summary of all versions of the single found on I Am the Club Rocker and its digital and CD releases.)
1. "Club Rocker (Play & Win Radio Edit Version)" – 3:32
2. "Club Rocker (Play & Win Radio Edit Version) [feat. Flo Rida]" – 3:34
3. "Club Rocker (Play & Win Extended Version)" – 4:16
4. "Club Rocker (Play & Win Extended Version) [feat. Flo Rida]" – 4:16
5. "Club Rocker (Play & Win Remix)" – 4:09
6. "Club Rocker (Odd Radio Edit)" – 3:38
7. "Club Rocker (Odd Club Remix)" – 6:07
8. "Club Rocker (Allexinno Remix)" – 6:22
9. "Club Rocker (Adrian Sina Remix)" – 4:30
10. "Club Rocker (DJ Assad Remix)" – 3:39
11. "Club Rocker (The Perez Brothers Remix)" – 5:18
12. "Club Rocker (Odd Radio Edit) [feat. Flo Rida]" – 3:38
13. "Club Rocker (Odd Club Remix) [feat. Flo Rida]" – 6:21
14. "Club Rocker (Allexinno Remix) [feat. Flo Rida]" – 6:23

15. "Club Rocker (Adrian Sina Remix) [feat. Flo Rida]" – 4:47
16. "Club Rocker (DJ Assad Remix) [feat. Flo Rida]" – 3:38
17. "Club Rocker (Da Brozz Radio Edit) [feat. Flo Rida]" – 3:28
18. "Club Rocker (Da Brozz Club Remix) [feat. Flo Rida]" – 5:10
19. "Club Rocker (LuKone Radio Edit) [feat. Flo Rida]" – 3:46
20. "Club Rocker (LuKone Club Remix) [feat. Flo Rida]" – 5:44
21. "Club Rocker (Pat Farell Radio Edit) [feat. Flo Rida]" – 4:02
22. "Club Rocker (Pat Farell Club Remix) [feat. Flo Rida]" – 6:30
23. "Club Rocker (L.A. Sia Remix) [feat. Flo Rida]" – 5:46
24. "Club Rocker (Tony Zampa Remix) [feat. Flo Rida]" – 7:37
25. "Club Rocker (Mike Candys Radio Edit) [feat. Flo Rida]" – 3:02
26. "Club Rocker (Mike Candys Club Remix) [feat. Flo Rida]" – 5:18
27. "Club Rocker (Jack Holiday Remix) [feat. Flo Rida]" – 4:49
28. "Club Rocker (Cutmore Radio Edit) [feat. Flo Rida]" – 2:52
29. "Club Rocker (Cutmore Club Remix) [feat. Flo Rida" – 4:37

== Charts ==
=== Weekly charts ===
Chart (2011–2012)	Peak position
Austria (Ö3 Austria Top 40)	14
Belarus (Unistar Radio Top 20)	24
Belgium (Ultratip Bubbling Under Flanders)	36
Belgium (Ultratop 50 Wallonia)	29
CIS (Tophit)	46
Czech Republic Airplay (ČNS IFPI)	39
Denmark (Tracklisten)	26
France (SNEP)	32
Germany (GfK)	55
Global Dance Songs (Billboard)	24
Italy (FIMI)	89
Japan (Japan Hot 100)	55
Lebanon (OLT20)	4
Netherlands (Single Top 100)	79
Poland Dance (ZPAV)	20
Poland (Video Chart)	3
Romania (Romanian Top 100)	42
Slovakia Airplay (ČNS IFPI)	11
Switzerland (Schweizer Hitparade)	64
Turkey (Number One Top 20)	13

=== Year-end charts ===
Chart (2011)	Peak position
Poland (Dance Top 50)	50

== Release history ==
Region	Date	Format	Label
France	30 May 2011	Digital download	Roton
France	22 August 2011	CD single	Airplay
Italy	13 June 2011	Digital download	DIY
Spain	20 June 2011	Digital download	Roton
United States	26 July 2011	Digital download	Ultra
United Kingdom	11 November 2012	Digital download	AATW
Japan	N/A 2012	Promotional CD single	Warner

== See also ==
- List of music released by Romanian artists that has charted in major music markets
