= 2011 Balkan Music Awards =

- Also known as: Second Annual Balkan Music Awards

Production
- Production locations: Sofia, Bulgaria
- Production company: Balkanika Music Television

Original release
- Network: Balkanika Music Television
- Release: 4 June 2011

The Second Annual Balkan Music Awards were held in Sofia, the capital city of Bulgaria for the second time. The previous year's main winner of the show with the title "Best Song of Balkans 2009" was Željko Joksimović with Ljubavi representing Serbia with 37 points, followed closely by Flori Mumajesi with Playback from Albania with 31 points. Balkan Music Awards was originally broadcast by the Bulgarian Balkanika Music Television, and also by 11 other television stations in the Balkans.

== Performers ==
- (Romania) Inna

== Participants for "Best Song for Balkans 2010" ==
The following list shows 11 participants from every country who will wave their flag in Sofia. The participants were chosen online for 2 week voting. In every country there were 5 songs, most played in BMTV where only one got the chance to represent its country in Balkan's biggest annual award show. Every participant will be singing in front of an outside audience.

Country	Artist	Song	Score	Place
Albania	Aurela Gaçe, Dr.Flori & Marsel	"Origjinale"	92	1
Bosnia and Herzegovina	Armin Muzaferija	"Vulkani"	21	9
Bulgaria	Alisia	"Tvoya Totalno"	89	3
Croatia	Colonia	"Zavoli me u Prolazu"	47	6
Greece	Helena Paparizou	"An Isouna Agapi"	51	5
Macedonia	Elena Risteska	"Sakam Podobro Da Te Pamtam"	18	10
Montenegro	Aca Lukas & Dado Polumenta	"Sedam Subota"	12	11
Slovenia	Rebeka Dremelj	"Čarobni Zagrljaj"	25	8
Serbia	Nataša Bekvalac	"Dve u Meni"	30	7
Turkey	Emre Aydin	"Hoşçakal"	74	4

== See also ==
- Balkan Music Awards
