= Hudkreft =

Norwegian rock band

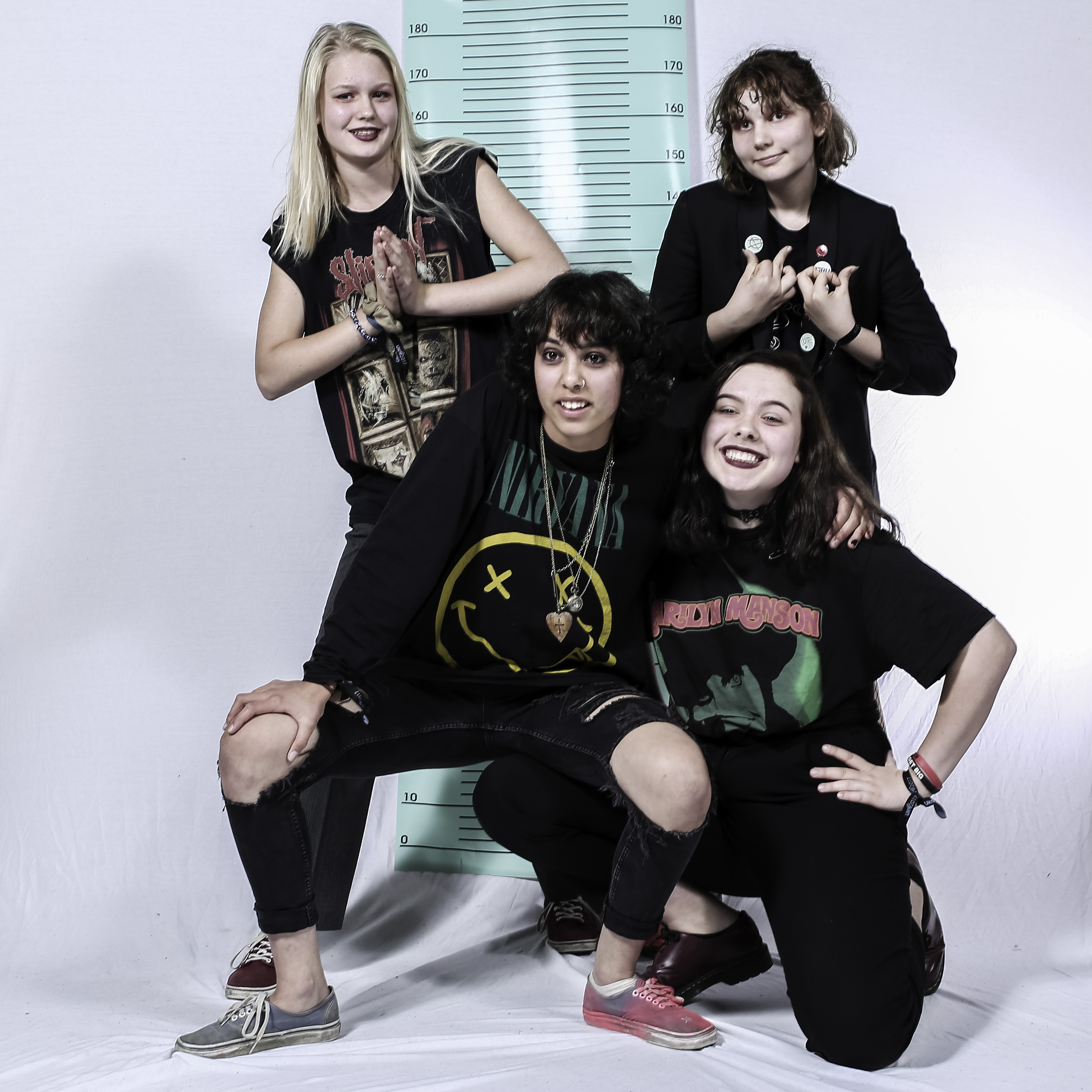
- Hudkreft in 2017. Clockwise from top left: Leah Røkke, Stella Oter Lindeberg, Smirna Simeonova, Roksana Niebrzegowska.

Background information
- Origin: Oslo, Norway
- Genres: Punk rock; ska; ska punk
- Years active: 2016–present
- Labels: Fysisk Format; Fucking North Pole
- Members: Leah Røkke; Stella Oter Lindeberg; Roksana Niebrzegowska; Johannes Granaas Danielsen
- Past members: Smirna Simeonova

Hudkreft ("skin cancer" in Norwegian) are a Norwegian punk rock band from Oslo. Formed in 2016, they released several singles before their debut album Nevemagnet in 2021. In 2023, their second album, Osyo by was released. The band's musical style combines punk rock with ska influences and feminist topics, and draws inspiration from other Norwegian groups.

== History ==
Hudkreft were formed by vocalist and guitarist Leah Røkke and drummer Stella Oter Lindeberg at a band camp for girls in 2016. During their early years, they released several singles, before signing with Fysisk Format in the spring of 2021; their debut album, Nevemagnet, was released on 17 September 2021.

The band's second album, Osyo by, was released on 15 September 2023, also by Fysisk Format. The album's title alludes to Karsten Alnæs's 1985 novel Øy. In 2024, Osyo by was nominated for the Spellemannprisen for the best rock album; the band criticized the prize for agreeing to a sponsorship with PepsiCo, which due to its ownership of SodaStream was a target of the Boycott, Divestment and Sanctions movement. The band said they would still attend the award ceremony to draw attention to the issue.

== Members ==
Johannes Granaas Danielsen became the band's bassist in 2020. Since then, it has consisted of Leah Røkke as vocalist and guitarist, Stella Oter Lindeberg as drummer, Roksana Niebrzegowska as guitarist, and Danielsen as bassist.

== Musicianship ==
The music of Hudkreft has been described as "old school punk" and as including elements of ska. Honningbarna and Razika are often cited as inspirations for the band's musical style.

Lyrically, Hudkreft employ anti-establishment themes common in punk rock as well as addressing feminist topics.

== Discography ==
=== Studio albums ===
- Nevemagnet, Fysisk Format, 17 September 2021
- Osyo by, Fysisk Format, 15 September 2023

=== Compilation album ===
- 2020: Pønk i Norge, Fucking North Pole Records, 12 June 2020

=== EP ===
- Luksusproblemer, self-published, 2 February 2019

=== Singles ===
- "Tid er penger", self-published, 8 November 2017
- "I saksen", self-published, 17 November 2017
- "Ting trang", self-published, 18 January 2019
- "Kulturelitens barn", self-published, 26 July 2019
- "All cops are bastards (demo)", self-published, 31 July 2020
- "Jentemonsteret", Fysisk Format, 28 May 2021
- "President raprock!", Fysisk Format, 13 August 2021
- "Sommerskygge", Fysisk Format, 10 June 2022
- "Årvåken", Fysisk Format, 14 October 2022
- "Dubben er død og Center of the Universe drepte den", Fysisk Format, 14 December 2022 (with Center of the Universe)
- "Salamander", Fysisk Format, 3 March 2023
- "10.000 soler", Fysisk Format, 16 June 2023
- "Osyo storbynatt", Fysisk Format, 6 June 2024
