= Staut =

Norwegian rock, folk, and pop band

- Origin: Valdres, Norway
- Genres: Rock, Folk, Pop
- Years active: 2009-present
- Members: Gaute Ausrød; Ørnulf Juvkam Dyve; Dag Arve Sandnes; Asle Tronrud; Torgeir Bolstad; Frode Flatland
- Website: www.staut.no

Staut is a Norwegian rock, folk and pop band from Valdres, Oppland that was founded in 2009 with efforts of songwriter Ørnulf Juvkam Dyve using many times the local dialect with Gaute Ausrød as band vocalist. The 6-member band performs a mixed version of rock, folk, pop and country owing to the varied origins of its members. The band has released six albums to date, Staut in 2010 heavily touring in 2011 for its promotion and the follow-up album Eigarlaus in 2012 reaching number 2 in the Norwegian Albums Chart, Stugureint in 2013 that peaked at number 1 in its first week of release, St. Peppersby in 2014, Ja in 2017 and Makalaus in 2019.

== Members ==
- Gaute Ausrød—vocals, guitar
- Ørnulf Juvkam Dyve—lyricist, composer, keyboards
- Dag Arve Sandnes—guitar, mandolin
- Asle Tronrud—fiddle
- Torgeir Bolstad—double bass
- Frode Flatland—drums

== Discography ==
=== Albums ===
Year	Album	Peak positions	Certification
Year	Album	NOR	Certification
2010	Staut	9	
2012	Eigarlaus	2	
2013	Stugureint	2	
2014	St. Peppersby	15	
2017	Ja	28	
2019	Makalaus	33	

=== Singles ===
- 2010: "Sjå sole"
- 2015 "Feberheit"
