= Trevis Brendmoe =

Trevis
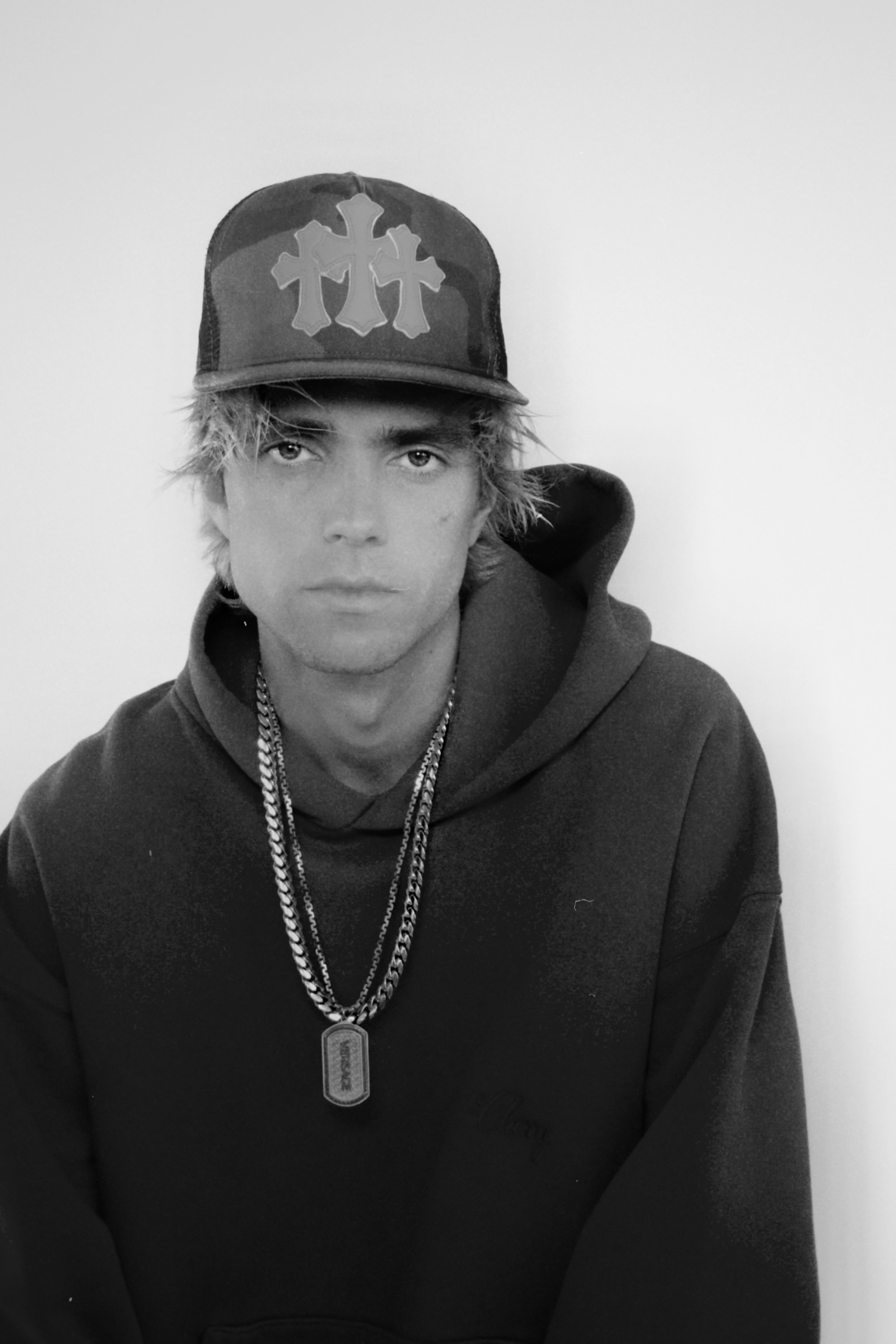

Background information
- Birth name: Trevis Brendmoe
- Also known as: Sivert Tinius
- Born: Oslo, Norway
- Genres: Pop; RnB; EDM
- Occupations: Singer; Songwriter; Record producer
- Website: trevisbrendmoe.com

Sivert Tinius Brendmoe, known professionally as Trevis Brendmoe, and TREVIS, is a Norwegian-born singer-songwriter and record producer.

Trevis' music has been used in television shows such as Hvite Gutter and Ex on the Beach.

== Early life and career ==
Trevis Brendmoe was born in Oslo, Norway in 1998. From a young age Trevis was interested to become a professional football player. To achieve his goal, he joined Manchester United's youth academy, but injury put it to an abrupt halt. In his short football career, he played for Bækkelagets SK. He had to give up football because of injury. At the age of 15, worried for his safety and mental health, his mother relocated him to the United States where he quickly found his voice in music and began releasing his own records shortly after.

In 2017, his debut single "Hard To Get" was released. Trevis gained attention in Norway, whereas his song was added to Norway's national radio network, NRK Radio.

In 2018, his singles such as "Paranoid", "Honey", "Way You Do It" and "That's How Love Will Do", were released.

In 2019, his single "Pretty Girls" was released. This was Trevis, alias Sivert Tinius's first release in the United States. Nöjesguiden included "Pretty Girls" in their Singles of the Month list for January 2019. In the same year, Trevis performed an unreleased song "Rocketman" at the 2019 Findings Festival in Oslo, Norway. Trevis went on to release the song as a single together with Norwegian DJ-duo Broiler. The song was also played on several television shows such as Hvite gutter and Ex on the Beach.

In 2020, he released the single "Options" during the COVID-19 pandemic.

In April 2022, Trevis returned to the music scene releasing his debut single "All Night" from his upcoming EP "Floor Plan".

== Discography ==
- "Hard To Get" (2017)
- "Paranoid" (2018)
- "Honey" (2018)
- "Way You Do It" (2018)
- "That’s How Love Will Do" (2018)
- "Pretty Girls" (2019)
- "Rocketman" (2019)
- "Options" (2020)
- "All Night" (2022)
