= Neighboring Sounds (band) =

Norwegian indie band

- Origin: Bergen
- Genres: Alt Rock / Emo / Indie
- Years active: 7
- Members: Arild Eriksen (vocals, guitar), Anders Blom (bass), Kristian Gundersen(guitar), Thomas Milford (drums)
- Past members: Aaron Arjuna Rudra (1979-2004) (bass 2000-2003), Thomas Santuna Larssen (bass 2003-2006), Yngve Andersen (bass 2015-2016), Thomas Santuna Larssen (bass 2016-2021)
- Website: http://www.facebook.com/neighboringsounds

Neighboring Sounds is an indie band from Bergen, Norway. 2004-2006 the band was called The First Cut and before 2004 the band was called Crash (n).

Crash (n) was formed in 2000 in Bergen, Norway. The band released two 7", one 10" and a CD, toured Europe and Scandinavia once and the UK twice. After Aaron Arjuna Rudra left the band in 2003 the band chose to change name and continued as The First Cut. The band did numerous shows and released a CD in 2006 called "Silence afterwards", but due to different circumstances the band found it hard to carry on with touring and kept a low profile throughout 2005 and 2006.

The First Cut was on a hiatus from 2005 until 2014. Thomas Santuna Larssen played bass in Datarock, and Ralph Myerz and the Jack Herren Band while Kristian Gundersen used to play in the band I.O.U. Arild Eriksen sang and played bass in Bouvet.

In 2014 the band reformed under the name Neighboring Sounds. Yngve Andersen from the band Blood Command played bass. The band first recorded a few songs with Kenneth Ishak of Beezewax in 2016 but only released the song Everyone's From Somewhere Else digitally. Thomas Larssen joined the band again in 2016. The band recorded another few songs with Kenneth Ishak in 2019 and released the single Spolia in 2020 on the label Sound Fiction.

Anders Blom from the bands Flight Mode, Youth Pictures of Florence Henderson, Islandsgate and Ben Leiper joined on bass in 2021.

Neighboring Sounds recorded the album "Cold in the smart city", which was released in autumn 2023 on the labels Friend Club (US), strictly no capital letters (UK), Bcore disc (ES), Friend of mine (JPN), Adagio830 (GER), Lilla Himmel (N) and Sound fiction (N).

== Discography ==
As Neighboring Sounds

- Cold in the smart city - Ivar Winther remix Digital single (2024)
- Cold in the smart city LP/Digital (2023)
- Polis Digital single (2023)
- No commons Digital single (2023)
- Holiday palaces Digital single (2023)
- Everyone's From Somewhere Else 7" (2021)
- Spolia Digital single (2020)
- Everyone's From Somewhere Else Digital single (2020)

As The First Cut

- Silence Afterwards CD (2006)

As Crash (n)

- Crash (2000) 7" on Sound Fiction.
- Young Boy I Can Help You Through Your Exams (2001) 10" on Sound Fiction and Premonition Records.
- Split with Solea (US) (2002) 7" on Sound Fiction.
- Young Boy I Can Help You Through Your Exams and more (2003) CD on *Firefly Recordings.
