= List of awards and nominations received by Margaret =

Margaret awards and nominations
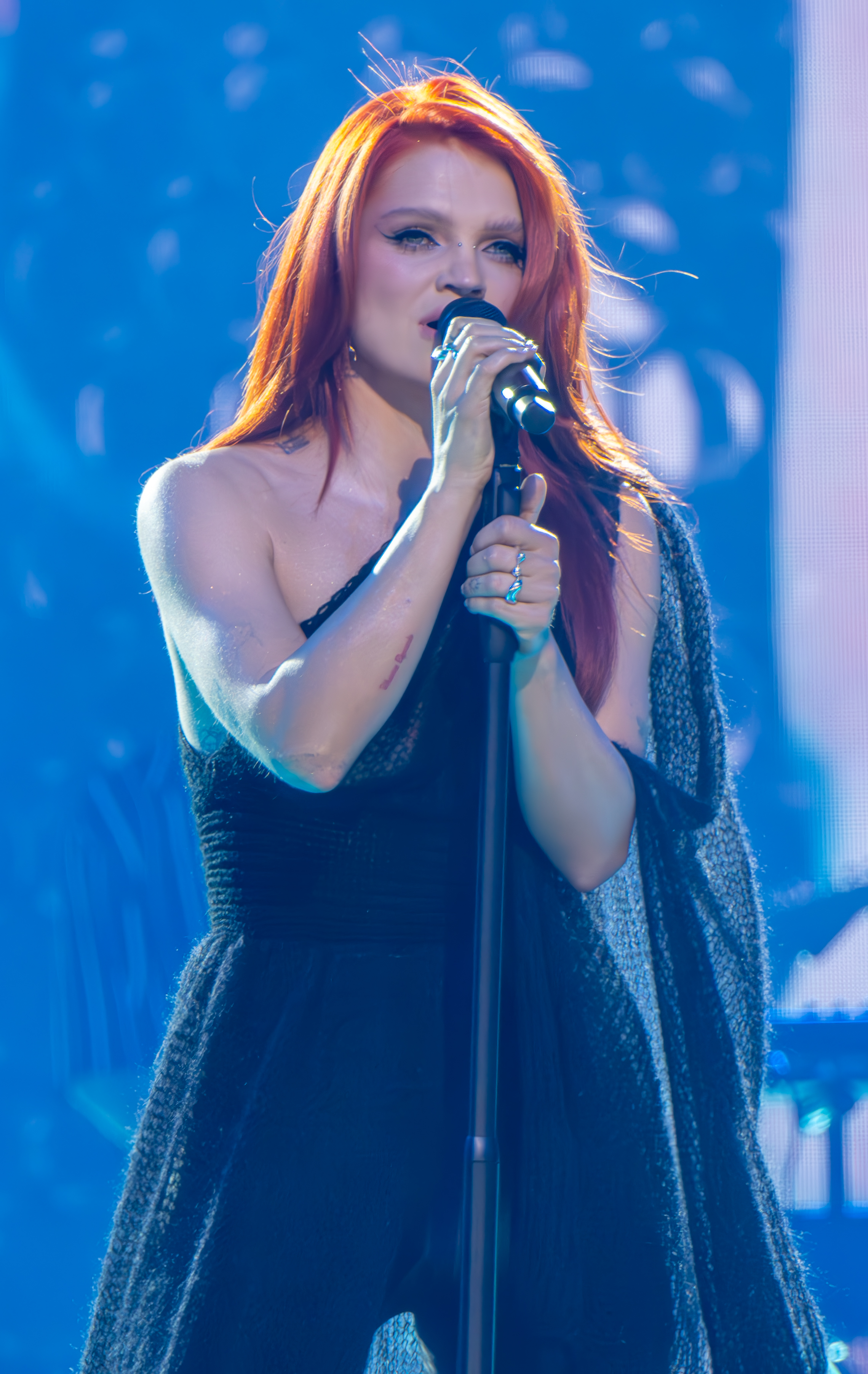
- Margaret at the 2024 Fryderyk awards
Awards and nominations (Note: In some cases Margaret did not win the main prize, but received an award for coming second, third or fourth and since this is a specific recognition and is different from losing an award these mentions are considered wins. Awards in certain categories do not have prior nominations and only winners are announced. For simplification and to avoid errors, each award in this list has been presumed to have had a prior nomination.)
| Award | Wins | Nominations |
Totals
| Baltic Song Contest | 1 | 1 |
| Digital Song of the Year | 1 | 1 |
| Grube Ryby | 1 | 2 |
| Eska Music Awards | 5 | 11 |
| Fryderyk | 0 | 3 |
| Fryderyk Audience Award | 0 | 2 |
| Glamour Poland Woman of the Year | 2 | 2 |
| Joy Poland Influencer of the Year | 0 | 1 |
| MTV Europe Music Awards | 4 | 9 |
| National Festival of Polish Song | 1 | 2 |
| Nickelodeon Kids' Choice Awards | 1 | 4 |
| On Air Music Awards | 0 | 1 |
| PL Music Video Awards | 0 | 1 |
| Polsat SuperHit Festival | 2 | 2 |
| Popkillery | 0 | 2 |
| Radio ZET and Polsat's Hit of the Summer | 0 | 1 |
| RMF FM and Polsat's Hit of the Summer | 1 | 3 |
| Gala's Roses | 1 | 4 |
| ShEO Awards | 1 | 1 |
| TOPtrendy | 0 | 3 |
| SuperJedynki | 1 | 3 |
| Telecameras | 0 | 1 |
| Top of the Top Sopot Festival | 0 | 1 |
| Wiktory | 0 | 2 |
| Wins | 22 |
| Nominations | 62 |

Margaret is a Polish singer and songwriter. She has won various accolades during her career, including five Eska Music Awards out of 11 nominations, a Kids' Choice Award for Favourite Polish Star, and four MTV Europe Music Awards for Best Polish Act out of eight nominations (she was also nominated for Best European Act in 2015). Her third MTV Europe Music Award win in 2018 made her the first Polish artist to win the award more than twice, a record she extended in 2020 with her fourth win.

In 2013, Margaret received an award for coming second at the 2013 Baltic Song Contest in Sweden, where she performed her debut single "Thank You Very Much" and a cut from her first EP "I Get Along" against nine other competitors. "Thank You Very Much" was also one of the winners of the Digital Song of the Year award as the third-best selling Polish digital single of 2013. The song's controversial music video, which received substantial media coverage for nudity, was named Best Music Video at the 2013 Eska Music Awards.

Margaret has also received two awards at the National Festival of Polish Song: a SuperJedynka award in 2014 and the TVP1 Special Award in 2017. She was recognised by the Polish edition of Glamour magazine as Glamour Woman of the Year and Fashion Icon in 2014 and 2015, respectively. Margaret was also honoured with the 2016 Gala's Roses award in the Music category for her collaborative jazz album with Matt Dusk, titled Just the Two of Us. In 2015, the Polish magazine Wprost ("Directly") named her one of the 50 most influential Polish celebrities.

== Awards and nominations ==
| Ceremony | Year of ceremony | Nominee/work | Category | Result | Ref(s) |
|---|---|---|---|---|---|
| Baltic Song Contest | 2013 | "Thank You Very Much" / "I Get Along" | Grand Prix | Second | |
| Digital Song of the Year | 2014 | "Thank You Very Much" | Polish Song | Third | |
| Grube Ryby | 2015 | Margaret | Hit Voice | Nominated | |
| Grube Ryby | 2017 | Margaret | Hit Voice | Won | |
| Eska Music Awards | 2013 | Margaret | Best Female Artist | Nominated | |
| Eska Music Awards | 2013 | Margaret | Best Debut | Nominated | |
| Eska Music Awards | 2013 | "Thank You Very Much" | Best Hit | Nominated | |
| Eska Music Awards | 2013 | "Thank You Very Much" | Best Music Video | Won | |
| Eska Music Awards | 2014 | "Wasted" | Best Music Video | Nominated | |
| Eska Music Awards | 2015 | Margaret | Best Female Artist | Won | |
| Eska Music Awards | 2015 | Margaret | Best Artist on the Internet | Won | |
| Eska Music Awards | 2016 | Margaret | Best Female Artist | Nominated | |
| Eska Music Awards | 2016 | Margaret | Best Artist on the Internet | Won | |
| Eska Music Awards | 2016 | "Cool Me Down" | Best Hit | Nominated | |
| Eska Music Awards | 2017 | Margaret | Best Artist on the Internet | Won | |
| Fryderyk | 2020 | Gaja Hornby | Album of the Year – Pop | Nominated | |
| Fryderyk | 2021 | "Reksiu" (featuring Otsochodzi) | Video of the Year | Nominated | |
| Fryderyk | 2025 | Siniaki i cekiny | Album of the Year – Pop | Nominated | |
| Fryderyk Audience Award | 2019 | "Byle jak" | Hit of the Year | Nominated | |
| Fryderyk Audience Award | 2020 | "Tempo" | Hit of the Year | Nominated | |
| Glamour Poland Woman of the Year | 2014 | Margaret | Glamour Woman of the Year | Won | |
| Glamour Poland Woman of the Year | 2015 | Margaret | Fashion Icon | Won | |
| Joy Poland Influencer of the Year | 2017 | Margaret | It-Girl of the Year | Nominated | |
| MTV Europe Music Awards | 2013 | Margaret | Best Polish Act | Nominated | |
| MTV Europe Music Awards | 2015 | Margaret | Best Polish Act | Won | |
| MTV Europe Music Awards | 2015 | Margaret | Best European Act | Nominated | |
| MTV Europe Music Awards | 2016 | Margaret | Best Polish Act | Won | |
| MTV Europe Music Awards | 2017 | Margaret | Best Polish Act | Nominated | |
| MTV Europe Music Awards | 2018 | Margaret | Best Polish Act | Won | |
| MTV Europe Music Awards | 2020 | Margaret | Best Polish Act | Won | |
| MTV Europe Music Awards | 2021 | Margaret | Best Polish Act | Nominated | |
| MTV Europe Music Awards | 2022 | Margaret | Best Polish Act | Nominated | |
| National Festival of Polish Song | 2016 | "Smak radości" | Grand Prix | Eliminated | |
| National Festival of Polish Song | 2017 | Margaret | TVP1 Special Award | Won | |
| Nickelodeon Kids' Choice Awards | 2014 | Margaret | Favourite Polish Star | Nominated | |
| Nickelodeon Kids' Choice Awards | 2015 | Margaret | Favourite Polish Star | Nominated | |
| Nickelodeon Kids' Choice Awards | 2016 | Margaret | Favourite Polish Star | Won | |
| Nickelodeon Kids' Choice Awards | 2017 | Margaret | Favourite Polish Star | Nominated | |
| On Air Music Awards | 2025 | Margaret | Female Artist of the Year | Nominated | |
| PL Music Video Awards | 2020 | "Nowe Plemię" | Pop | Nominated | |
| Polsat SuperHit Festival | 2015 | "Wasted" | Radio Hit of the Year | Fourth | |
| Polsat SuperHit Festival | 2016 | "Heartbeat" | Fakt Readers' Award | Won | |
| Popkillery | 2021 | Margaret | Best Non-Rap #hot16challenge2 – Audience Award | Fifth | |
| Popkillery | 2024 | Margaret | Female Rapper of the Year – Academy and Audience Award | Nominated | |
| Radio ZET and Polsat's Hit of the Summer | 2023 | "Tańcz głupia" | Hit of the Summer | Nominated | |
| RMF FM and Polsat's Hit of the Summer | 2016 | "Cool Me Down" | Hit of the Summer | Nominated | |
| RMF FM and Polsat's Hit of the Summer | 2017 | "What You Do" | Hit of the Summer | Nominated | |
| RMF FM and Polsat's Hit of the Summer | 2018 | "Byle jak" | Hit of the Summer | Won | |
| Gala's Roses | 2013 | Margaret | Debut | Nominated | |
| Gala's Roses | 2015 | Margaret | Media | Nominated | |
| Gala's Roses | 2016 | Just the Two of Us (with Matt Dusk) | Music | Won | |
| Gala's Roses | 2019 | Gaja Hornby | Music | Nominated | |
| ShEO Awards | 2024 | Margaret | Engaged Culture | Won | |
| TOPtrendy | 2012 | "Thank You Very Much" | Grand Prix of "Trendy" contest | Nominated | |
| TOPtrendy | 2013 | "Thank You Very Much" | Biggest Hit of the Year | Nominated | |
| TOPtrendy | 2014 | "Wasted" | Biggest Hit of the Year | Nominated | |
| SuperJedynki | 2014 | Margaret | SuperArtist Without Limits | Won | |
| SuperJedynki | 2015 | Margaret | SuperArtist | Nominated | |
| SuperJedynki | 2015 | Add the Blonde | SuperAlbum | Nominated | |
| Telecameras | 2015 | Margaret | Music | Nominated | |
| Top of the Top Sopot Festival | 2021 | "Tak na oko" | Amber Nightingale Award | Nominated | |
| Wiktory | 2014 | Margaret | Star of the Song | Nominated | |
| Wiktory | 2015 | Margaret | Artist of the Year | Nominated | |
