= Blue Vibes (song) =

Single by Margaret

from the album Smurfs: The Lost Village
- Released: 17 March 2017
- Genre: Europop
- Length: 3:11
- Label: Extensive Music; Magic Records
- Songwriters: Joakim Buddee; Ingrid Hägglund; Margaret; Dimitri Stassos
- Producers: Dimitri Stassos; Joakim Buddee

Margaret singles chronology
"Let It Snow!" (2016)	"Blue Vibes" (2017)	"What You Do" (2017)

Music video
- "Blue Vibes" on YouTube

"Blue Vibes" is a song by Polish singer Margaret. It was recorded to promote the Polish-language version of the 2017 animated feature film, Smurfs: The Lost Village. The song was also included on Margaret's third studio album Monkey Business (2017). The single was released on 17 March 2017, only in Poland. It was written by Joakim Buddee, Ingrid Hägglund, Margaret and Dimitri Stassos, and produced by Stassos and Buddee.

== Music video ==
A music video for "Blue Vibes", released on 17 March 2017, was directed by Konrad Aksinowicz. The video features scenes filmed in a studio with Margaret and a person dressed as Smurfette dancing on a baby pink background, as well as scenes from Smurfs: The Lost Village.

== Critical reception ==
Wiwibloggs' Chris Halpin wrote that the song "doesn't really stray too far out of Margaret's latest offerings. It's perhaps a little more chilled compared to "Elephant, with less of the aggressive drums and a more summery feel to the beat. ... The song also doesn't tie itself in to the Smurfs at all: this isn't a theme song, merely a riff. We're thinking "Can't Stop the Feeling!" here, y'all. It's a grown up track that suits Margaret's vocal and doesn't sacrifice to fit a PR campaign, but is merely enhanced by it." Mike Wass of Idolator believed that "this ridiculous euro-pop anthem is even catchier" than "I'm a Lady" by Meghan Trainor, a track also recorded for Smurfs: The Lost Village.

== Release history ==
Release history for "Blue Vibes"
Region	Date	Format	Label	Ref.
Poland	17 March 2017	Digital download	Extensive Music; Magic Records	
