= Thank You Very Much (Margaret song) =

Single by Margaret

from the EP All I Need and the album Add the Blonde
- Released: 21 February 2013
- Genre: Pop
- Length: 3:10
- Label: Magic; Extensive; Broma16; B1M1; X-Energy
- Songwriters: Thomas Karlsson; Joakim Buddee
- Producer: Ant Whiting

Margaret singles chronology
"It Will Be Lovely Day" (2012)	"Thank You Very Much" (2013)	"Tell Me How Are Ya" (2013)

Music video
- "Thank You Very Much" on YouTube

Alternative cover
- Alternative cover used in selected territories

"Thank You Very Much" is a song by Polish singer Margaret. It was included on her first extended play (EP) All I Need (2013), and later also on her debut studio album Add the Blonde (2014). The song was written by Thomas Karlsson and Joakim Buddee, and produced by Ant Whiting.

In May 2012, Margaret debuted "Thank You Very Much" at the 2012 Sopot TOPtrendy festival, and the song was released to Polish contemporary hit radio. Shortly thereafter, Margaret's management decided to remove the song from radio playlists and develop a promotional plan before re-releasing it. The song was released for digital download in Poland on 21 February 2013 along with its music video directed by Chris Piliero. "Thank You Very Much" was later released in various other markets. It charted in the top 50 in Austria, Germany and Italy. The song won an award as the third-best-selling digital single of 2013 in Poland by a Polish artist.

Margaret represented Poland at the 2013 Baltic Song Contest with "Thank You Very Much", and finished in second place. On 25 April 2023, she released live version of the song as a single from her MTV Unplugged concert special and its accompanying live album.

== Music video ==
The song's music video, which features Margaret surrounded by 30 nude extras, was released on YouTube in February 2013. It was filmed in Los Angeles, and Chris Piliero was enlisted as its director. Shortly after its release, the video was removed by YouTube for violating the site's policy against nudity and sexual content, but was later restored with age restrictions. Following this, Margaret expressed her support for the right to nudity under the slogan, "Liberty, Equality, Fraternity", and criticised YouTube for censorship. The video received substantial media coverage, which contributed to the international success of "Thank You Very Much". A year after its release, it was featured on the website 9GAG, which led to a surge in its YouTube traffic, resulting in a gain of more than 500,000 views within 24 hours. The video won the Eska Music Award for Best Video.

== Track listing ==
- Digital single
1. "Thank You Very Much" (UK Radio Version) – 3:10
2. "Thank You Very Much" (Radio Version) – 3:09
3. "Thank You Very Much" (Extended Version) – 4:21
- Digital single – Remix
1. "Thank You Very Much" (DJ Tr-Meet Remix) – 4:10
- Digital EP – Remixes
1. "Thank You Very Much" (Vital G Remix Radio Edit) – 4:09
2. "Thank You Very Much" (Vital G Remix) – 5:49
3. "Thank You Very Much" (Vital G Club Remix) – 6:14
4. "Thank You Very Much" (Vital G Club Remix Edit) – 3:48
- CD single
1. "Thank You Very Much" (Radio Edit) – 3:10
2. "Thank You Very Much" (Single Edit) – 3:09
3. "Thank You Very Much" (Extended Version) – 4:21

== Accolades ==
Year	Ceremony	Category	Result	Ref.
2013	Sopot TOPtrendy Festival	Biggest Hit of the Year	Nominated	
2013	Baltic Song Contest	Grand Prix	Second	
2013	Eska Music Awards	Biggest Hit of the Year	Nominated	
2013	Eska Music Awards	Best Music Video	Won	
2014	Sopot TOPtrendy Festival	Digital Song of the Year	Third	

== Charts ==
=== Weekly charts ===
Chart (2013)	Peak position
CIS (TopHit)	127
Austria (Ö3 Austria Top 40)	38
Germany (GfK)	41
Italy (FIMI)	22
Poland (Polish Airplay New)	2

== Release history ==
Region	Date	Format	Version	Label	Ref.
Poland	21 February 2013	Digital download	Original	Magic Records	
Russia	24 February 2013	Digital download	Original	Extensive Music; Broma16	
Scandinavia	18 March 2013	Digital download	Original	Extensive Music	
Russia	17 June 2013	Contemporary hit radio	Original	Broma16	
Austria	21 June 2013	Digital download	Original	Extensive Music; B1M1 Recordings	
Germany	21 June 2013	Digital download	Original	Extensive Music; B1M1 Recordings	
Switzerland	21 June 2013	Digital download	Original	Extensive Music; B1M1 Recordings	
Italy	26 July 2013	Digital download	Original	Extensive Music; B1M1 Recordings; X-Energy Records	
Various	30 July 2013	Digital download	DJ Tr-Meet Remix	Broma16	
Italy	27 September 2013	Contemporary hit radio	Original	X-Energy Records	
Italy	1 November 2013	Digital download	EP	Extensive Music; B1M1 Recordings; X-Energy Records	
Various	4 November 2013	Digital download	Original	Extensive Music	
Italy	17 December 2013	Digital download	Remixes EP	Extensive Music; B1M1 Recordings; X-Energy Records	
Italy	18 December 2013	CD single	Original	X-Energy Records	
