= Wasted (Margaret song) =

Single by Margaret

from the album Add the Blonde
- Released: 15 January 2014
- Genre: Pop
- Length: 3:21
- Label: Magic; Extensive; Warner
- Songwriter(s): Boris Potemkin; Anthony Whiting; Emily Philips; Robert Uhlmann; Thomas Karlsson

Margaret singles chronology
| "Tell Me How Are Ya" (2013) | "Wasted" (2014) | "Start a Fire" (2014) |

Music video
- "Wasted" on YouTube

Alternative cover
- Artwork in Scandinavia

"Wasted" is a song by Polish singer Margaret. It was included on her debut studio album, Add the Blonde (2014), and released as its lead single in Poland on 15 January 2014 by Magic Records. On 28 April 2014, the single was released in Scandinavia by Warner Music Sweden and Extensive Music. The song was written by Boris Potemkin, Anthony Whiting, Emily Philips, Robert Uhlmann and Thomas Karlsson. It samples Edita Piekha's 1967 song "Our Neighbour" (Russian: "Наш сосед" nash sosed).

Margaret debuted "Wasted" at the Sylwestrowa Moc Przebojów ("New Year's Eve Power of Hits") concert in Gdynia, Poland on 31 December 2013. The single reached number six on the Polish Airplay Chart.

== Music video ==
The song's music video premiered on Orange Poland website on 14 January 2014, and was uploaded to YouTube on 30 January 2014. The video was directed by Julia Bui Ngoc. It was filmed in Warsaw, and draws inspirations from the Jean-Pierre Jeunet's 2001 film Amélie and the work of Andy Warhol.

== Track listing ==
- Digital single
1. "Wasted" (Radio Version) – 3:21
- Digital single – Remixes
1. "Wasted" (Esquire Remix) – 4:43
2. "Wasted" (Esquire Radio) – 3:08

== Accolades ==
| Year | Ceremony | Category | Result | Ref. |
|---|---|---|---|---|
| 2014 | Sopot TOPtrendy Festival | Biggest Hit of the Year | Nominated | |
| 2014 | Eska Music Awards | Best Music Video | Nominated | |
| 2015 | Polsat SuperHit Festival | Radio Hit of the Year | Fourth | |

== Charts ==
=== Weekly charts ===
| Chart (2014) | Peak position |
|---|---|
| Poland (Polish Airplay Top 100) | 6 |
| Poland (Dance Top 50) | 30 |

=== Year-end charts ===
| Chart (2014) | Position |
|---|---|
| Poland (Airplay 2014) | 32 |

== Release history ==
| Region | Date | Format | Version | Label | Ref. |
|---|---|---|---|---|---|
| Poland | 15 January 2014 | Digital download | Original | Magic Records | |
| Poland | 14 February 2014 | Digital download | Remixes | Magic Records | |
| Scandinavia | 28 April 2014 | Digital download | Original | Extensive Music; Warner Music Sweden | |
