= All I Need (Margaret EP) =

EP by Margaret
- Released: 30 July 2013
- Genre: Pop
- Length: 20:20
- Label: Extensive; Magic

Margaret chronology
All I Need (2013)	Add the Blonde (2014)

Singles from All I Need
- 1. "Thank You Very Much" Released: 21 February 2013; 2. "Tell Me How Are Ya" Released: 4 July 2013

Professional ratings
Review scores
Source	Rating
Onet	3/10 stars

All I Need is the first extended play (EP) by Polish singer Margaret released on 30 July 2013 by Extensive Music and Magic Records, only in Poland. It yielded two singles, "Thank You Very Much" released on 21 February 2013, and "Tell Me How Are Ya" released on 4 July 2013. All songs from the EP were included on Margaret's 2014 debut studio album Add the Blonde.

All I Need peaked at number 50 on the Polish Albums Chart.

== Track listing ==
All I Need
No.	Title	Writer(s)	Length
1.	"Thank You Very Much"	Thomas Karlsson; Joakim Buddee	3:10
2.	"Tell Me How Are Ya"	Karlsson; Buddee; Martin Eriksson	3:27
3.	"All I Need"	Karlsson; Katy Rose; Buddee; Eriksson	3:53
4.	"Click"	Karlsson; Buddee; Lovisa Birgersson; Eriksson	3:01
5.	"Get Away"	Margaret; Olga Czyżykiewicz; Karlsson; Buddee; Eriksson	3:26
6.	"I Get Along"	Karlsson; Eriksson; Buddee	3:23
Total length:			20:20

== Charts ==
Chart (2013)	Peak position
Polish Albums (ZPAV)	50

== Release history ==
Region	Date	Format	Label	Ref.
Poland	30 July 2013	CD	Extensive Music; Magic Records	
Poland	3 August 2013	Digital download	Magic Records	
