= Gaja Hornby Tour =

2019 concert tour by Margaret

- Tour by Margaret
- Associated album: Gaja Hornby
- Start date: 2 October 2019
- End date: 25 October 2019
- Legs: 1
- No. of shows: 5

Margaret concert chronology
- Gaja Hornby Tour (2019); Maggie Vision Tour (2021)

The Gaja Hornby Tour is the first headlining concert tour by Polish singer Margaret, in support of her fourth studio album, Gaja Hornby (2019). It visited five clubs in Poland between 2 and 25 October 2019.

== Background and development ==
The tour was announced in February 2019. It was planned to begin on 24 May 2019 with a concert at the Arena COS Torwar in Warsaw, Poland, but the show was cancelled and the first concert was rescheduled and moved to a different venue. The tour officially began on 2 October 2019 and took place at Warsaw's Stodoła club. Overall, it visited five clubs in Poland, ending on 25 October 2019 at Białystok's "Gwint" club; the sixth and final date at Lublin's Klub30 scheduled for 30 October 2019 was cancelled two days prior for undisclosed reasons.

== Set list ==
During the tour, Margaret performed songs from her fourth studio album Gaja Hornby (2019), some of her biggest hits, and three unreleased songs. This set list is based on available sources covering the 2 October 2019 concert in Warsaw and may not be complete. The list does not reflect the order in which the songs were performed during the concert.

- "Błogość" (with Kacezet)
- "Błyski fleszy, plotki, ścianki"
- "Chwile bez słów" (with Kacezet)
- "Cool Me Down"
- "Czuję miętę" (Polish-language cover of Rosalía's song "Malamente")
- "Daenerys & Jon Snow" (with Kacezet)
- "Gaja Hornby"
- "Gaja Punk"
- "Heartbeat"
- "Nowe Plemiẹ" (with La taLa)
- "Psia mać"
- "Rebus"
- "Serce Baila"
- "Ten dzień"
- "Układanki"
- "Vajb" (with Gverilla)
- "What You Do"

Encore

- "Serce Baila"
- "Światło"

== Shows ==
List of concerts, showing date, city, country, venue, and opening acts
Date	City	Country	Venue	Opening acts
2 October 2019	Warsaw	Poland	"Stodoła" club	Linia Nocna
8 October 2019	Wrocław	Poland	Stary Klasztor	—N/a
16 October 2019	Łódź	Poland	"Scenografia" club	—N/a
17 October 2019	Poznań	Poland	"Tama" club	—N/a
25 October 2019	Białystok	Poland	"Gwint" club	—N/a

=== Cancelled shows ===
List of cancelled concerts, showing date, city, country, and venue
Date	City	Country	Venue
24 May 2019	Warsaw	Poland	Arena COS Torwar
30 October 2019	Lublin	Poland	"Klub30" club
