= Add the Blonde =

Studio album by Margaret
- Released: 26 August 2014
- Genre: Pop
- Length: 47:42
- Label: Extensive; Magic
- Producer: Joakim Buddee; Martin Eriksson; Ant Whiting

Margaret chronology
All I Need (2013)	Add the Blonde (2014)	Just the Two of Us (2015)

Singles from Add the Blonde
- 1. "Wasted" Released: 15 January 2014; 2. "Start a Fire" Released: 21 August 2014; 3. "Heartbeat" Released: 23 February 2015

Singles from Add the Blonde (reissue)
- 1. "Cool Me Down" Released: 19 February 2016; 2. "Elephant" Released: 27 August 2016

Alternative cover
- Reissue artwork

Professional ratings
Review scores
Source	Rating
Interia	1/10 stars
Onet	7/10 stars

Add the Blonde is the debut studio album by Polish singer Margaret. A pop record, it was influenced by retro-disco and ska, and by the work of Madonna. The album was produced by Joakim Buddee, Martin Eriksson, and Ant Whiting.

Add the Blonde was released on 26 August 2014, only in Poland. It consists of fourteen English-language tracks: eight new, and six previously included on Margaret's 2013 extended play (EP) All I Need. The album spawned three singles: "Wasted", "Start a Fire", and "Heartbeat". On 30 December 2014, Add the Blonde was released as a 12-inch vinyl, with altered tracklist.

The album's reissue was released exclusively to Biedronka on 19 September 2016, followed by its official release on 2 December. It included the singles "Cool Me Down" (and its three remixes) and "Elephant", and Margaret's Polish-language version of Robin Beck's song "First Time" titled "Smak radości" which was used in a Polish Coca-Cola commercial. On 23 December 2016, the "Special Limited Box" edition of the album was released to Empik. The box included its reissue and the 12-inch vinyl, as well as a 7-inch vinyl of "Heartbeat" (A-side) and "Cool Me Down" (B-side).

Add the Blonde reached number eight on the Polish Albums Chart, and was certified platinum by the Polish Society of the Phonographic Industry (ZPAV).

== Track listing ==
Add the Blonde
No.	Title	Writer(s)	Length
1.	"Wasted"	Boris Potemkin; Anthony Whiting; Emily Philips; Robert Uhlmann; Thomas Karlsson	3:20
2.	"Heartbeat"	Margaret; Joakim Buddee	3:17
3.	"Broke but Happy"	Karlsson; Buddee	3:42
4.	"Too Little of Love"	Margaret; Buddee	3:45
5.	"As Good as You"	Katy Rose; Joakim Buddee	3:46
6.	"Tell Me How Are Ya"	Karlsson; Buddee; Martin Eriksson	3:27
7.	"Thank You Very Much"	Karlsson; Buddee	3:10
8.	"All I Need"	Karlsson; Rose; Buddee; Eriksson	3:53
9.	"L.O.L."	Mattias Olofsson; Buddee	3:12
10.	"I Get Along"	Karlsson; Eriksson; Buddee	3:24
11.	"Click"	Karlsson; Buddee; Lovisa Birgersson; Eriksson	3:03
12.	"Get Away"	Margaret; Olga Czyżykiewicz; Karlsson; Buddee; Eriksson	3:27
13.	"Dance for 2"	Margaret; Karlsson; Buddee	2:54
14.	"Start a Fire"	Karlsson; Mats Tärnfors	3:22
Total length:			47:42

Add the Blonde — 12-inch vinyl Side A
No.	Title	Length
1.	"Wasted"	3:20
2.	"Heartbeat"	3:17
3.	"Broke but Happy"	3:42
4.	"As Good as You"	3:46
5.	"All I Need"	3:53

Side B
No.	Title	Length
1.	"Dance for 2"	2:54
2.	"Tell Me How Are Ya"	3:27
3.	"Thank You Very Much"	3:10
4.	"Start a Fire"	3:22
5.	"L.O.L."	3:12
Total length:		34:03

Add the Blonde — Reissue
No.	Title	Writer(s)	Length
1.	"Cool Me Down"	Robert Uhlmann; Arash; Alex Papaconstantinou; Anderz Wrethov; Viktor Svensson; Linnea Deb	2:59
2.	"Elephant"	Margaret; Joakim Buddee; Thomas Karlsson	3:06
3.	"Smak radości"	Tom Anthony; Gavin Spencer; Terry Boyle; Ewelina Kordy; Joanna Senieka	2:20
4.	"Wasted"	Boris Potemkin; Anthony Whiting; Emily Philips; Uhlmann; Karlsson	3:20
5.	"Heartbeat"	Margaret; Buddee	3:17
6.	"Broke but Happy"	Karlsson; Buddee	3:42
7.	"Too Little of Love"	Margaret; Buddee	3:45
8.	"As Good as You"	Katy Rose; Joakim Buddee	3:46
9.	"Tell Me How Are Ya"	Karlsson; Buddee; Martin Eriksson	3:27
10.	"Thank You Very Much"	Karlsson; Buddee	3:10
11.	"All I Need"	Karlsson; Rose; Buddee; Eriksson	3:53
12.	"L.O.L."	Mattias Olofsson; Buddee	3:12
13.	"I Get Along"	Karlsson; Eriksson; Buddee	3:24
14.	"Click"	Karlsson; Buddee; Lovisa Birgersson; Eriksson	3:27
15.	"Get Away"	Margaret; Olga Czyżykiewicz; Karlsson; Buddee; Eriksson	3:03
16.	"Dance for 2"	Margaret; Karlsson; Buddee	2:54
17.	"Start a Fire"	Karlsson; Mats Tärnfors	3:22
18.	"Cool Me Down" (Antrox Remix)	Uhlmann; Arash; Papaconstantinou; Wrethov; Svensson; Deb	4:21
19.	"Cool Me Down" (Decaville Remix)	Uhlmann; Arash; Papaconstantinou; Wrethov; Svensson; Deb	4:06
20.	"Cool Me Down" (Mike Candys Remix)	Uhlmann; Arash; Papaconstantinou; Wrethov; Svensson; Deb	4:44
Total length:			1:09:18

== Accolades ==
Year	Ceremony	Category	Result	Ref.
2015	SuperJedynki Awards	SuperAlbum	Nominated	

== Charts ==
Chart (2014)	Peak position
Polish Albums (ZPAV)	8

== Certification ==
Region	Certification	Certified units/sales
Poland (ZPAV)	Platinum	30,000^{‡}
^{‡} Sales+streaming figures based on certification alone.

== Release history ==
Region	Date	Format	Version	Label	Ref.
Poland	26 August 2014	CD; digital download	Standard	Extensive Music; Magic Records	
Poland	30 December 2014	12-inch vinyl	Altered standard	Extensive Music; Magic Records	
Poland	19 September 2016	CD (only Biedronka)	Reissue	Extensive Music; Magic Records	
Poland	2 December 2016	CD	Reissue	Extensive Music; Magic Records	
