= Start a Fire (Margaret song) =

Single by Margaret

from the album Add the Blonde
- Released: 21 August 2014
- Genre: Pop
- Length: 3:22
- Label: Magic
- Songwriters: Thomas Karlsson; Mats Tärnfors

Margaret singles chronology
"Wasted" (2014)	"Start a Fire" (2014)	"O mnie się nie martw" (2014)

Music video
- "Start a Fire" (2014 FIVB Volleyball Men's World Championship version) on YouTube "Start a Fire" (Single version) on YouTube

"Start a Fire" is a song by Polish singer Margaret. It was included on her debut studio album, Add the Blonde (2014), and released to Polish contemporary hit radio as its second single on 21 August 2014. The song was written by Thomas Karlsson and Mats Tärnfors. It also served as the official song of the 2014 FIVB Volleyball Men's World Championship. The alternate version of the song recorded for the World Championship includes Polish lyrics written by Margaret.

The single version of the song peaked at number 10 on the Polish Airplay Chart.

== Music video ==
A music video for the World Championship version of "Start a Fire" was released on 27 August 2014. Most of its scenes were filmed at Kraków Arena during the 2014 Memorial of Hubert Jerzy Wagner. A music video filmed for the single version of the song was directed by Olga Czyżykiewicz, and was released on 19 September 2014.

== Live performances ==
Margaret performed the song for the first time at the 2014 Memorial of Hubert Jerzy Wagner on 18 August 2014. She also performed it at the 2014 FIVB Volleyball Men's World Championship opening ceremony at the National Stadium in Warsaw later that month.

== Charts ==
=== Weekly charts ===
Chart (2014)	Peak position
Poland (Polish Airplay Top 100) Single version	10

== Release history ==
Region	Date	Format	Label	Ref.
Poland	21 August 2014	Contemporary hit radio	Magic Records	
