= Elephant (Margaret song) =

Single by Margaret

from the album Add the Blonde (reissue)
- Released: 27 August 2016
- Genre: Pop
- Length: 3:06
- Label: Extensive; Magic
- Songwriter(s): Małgorzata Jamroży; Joakim Buddee; Thomas Karlsson
- Producer(s): Joakim Buddee

Margaret singles chronology
"Cool Me Down" (2016)	"Elephant" (2016)	"Let It Snow!" (2016)

Music video
- "Elephant" on YouTube

"Elephant" is a song by Polish singer Margaret. It was included on the reissue of her debut studio album, Add the Blonde (2014), released in 2016. The song was written by Margaret, Joakim Buddee, and Thomas Karlsson, and produced by Buddee. It was released as a single on 27 August 2016, only in Poland.

"Elephant" reached number 21 on the Polish Airplay Chart.

== Music video ==
The song's music video premiered on Margaret's official mobile app on 13 September 2016. It was uploaded to her official YouTube channel a day later. The video was directed by Bogna Kowalczyk.

== Critical reception ==
Mike Wass of Idolator called the song's chorus "catchy as hell" and wrote that even though its "sound isn't entirely original, there's something about Margaret's accent combined with the oddball lyrics that is utterly charming."

== Live performances ==
Margaret performed Elephant for the first time at the Eska Music Awards on 26 August 2016.

== Charts ==
Chart performance for "Elephant"
Chart (2016)	Peak position
Poland (Polish Airplay Top 100)	21

== Release history ==
Release history and formats for "Elephant"
Region	Date	Format	Label	Ref.
Poland	27 August 2016	Digital download; streaming	Extensive Music; Magic Records	
