= Cool Me Down (Margaret song) =

Single by Margaret

from the album Add the Blonde (reissue)
- A-side: "Heartbeat"
- Released: 19 February 2016
- Genre: Pop; electropop; reggae
- Length: 2:59
- Label: Extensive; Magic; Broma16; Warner
- Songwriters: Alex Papaconstantinou; Anderz Wrethov; Arash; Linnea Deb; Robert Uhlmann; Viktor Svensson
- Producers: Alex P; Arash; Robert Uhlmann; Victory

Margaret singles chronology
"Coraz bliżej święta" (2015)	"Cool Me Down" (2016)	"Elephant" (2016)

Alternative cover
- Commercial cover art, which replaces the original since the 2016 re-release

Music video
- "Cool Me Down" (Official Music Video) on YouTube

"Cool Me Down" is a song by Polish singer Margaret. It was included in the reissue of her debut studio album, Add the Blonde, released in 2016. The song was written by Alex Papaconstantinou, Anderz Wrethov, Arash, Linnea Deb, Robert Uhlmann and Viktor Svensson; all but Wrethov and Deb, produced the track. The song is a combination of pop music, reggae and electropop.

The track was first released on streaming service Tidal and added to contemporary hit radio playlists in Poland by Extensive Music and Magic Records on 17 February 2016. Two days later, it was released for digital download in the same country by the aforementioned labels. The single was released in various territories by Warner Music Group on 22 April 2016. It received positive reviews from music critics for its lyrics and modern sound. Commercially, it peaked at number four in Poland, becoming Margaret's first Polish top five single. It also reached the top 40 in Romania and Sweden. The single was certified two-times platinum in Poland.

The song's music video, directed by Olga Czyżykiewicz, depicts two classical elements: water and fire, and features multiple dance sequences performed by Margaret and her dancers in various types of sceneries. Margaret promoted the single with live performances on television and at festivals in Poland and Sweden, and also included the song on the set list of her 2019 Gaja Hornby Tour and her 2023 MTV Unplugged concert special. She finished second in the final of Krajowe Eliminacje 2016, Poland's national selection for the Eurovision Song Contest 2016, with "Cool Me Down".

== Composition ==
"Cool Me Down" was written by Anderz Wrethov, Arash, Robert Uhlmann, Alex Papaconstantinou, Linnea Deb, and Viktor Svensson, with all, except Wrethov and Deb, producing the track. It was recorded in Malmö, Sweden. The track incorporates pop music with a combination of reggae and electropop. Music critics described it as "Scandi-pop hybrid of Rihanna and Kesha," comparing it to David Guetta's single "Hey Mama" (2015). Margaret's vocals were widely compared to Rihanna's, whom some listeners accused Margaret of copying. She responded; "In lower registers my timbre is indeed similar to Rihanna's, [...] I will not apologise for that". "Cool Me Down" is composed in the key of D minor with a tempo of 91 beats per minute. It is set in common time, and Margaret's vocal range spans from G_{4} to C_{6}. The verses follow in the chord progression of Dm-B♭-C and the chorus uses an Dm-B♭-F-C/E progression. Margaret described the song as being about "a very hot chick [...] rhythm, moves and sexiness".

== Release ==
On 8 February 2016, in an interview with RMF FM, Margaret announced the release of "Cool Me Down", and confirmed that she submitted the song for Krajowe Eliminacje 2016 ("National Eliminations 2016"), Poland's national selection for the Eurovision Song Contest 2016. "Cool Me Down" was released to Polish contemporary hit radio on 17 February, and was made available to stream exclusively on Tidal in Poland the same day. The single was issued as a digital download in the country by Extensive Music and Magic Records two days later. On 11 March, it was released in Russia by Broma16, and on 22 April, Warner Music Group released it in various countries. On 13 May, the track was added to contemporary hit radio in Italy by the aforementioned label. The song and its three remixes were included on the reissue of Margaret's debut studio album Add the Blonde (2014) released on 2 December 2016. The "Special Limited Box" edition of Add the Blonde released on 23 December 2016 included a 7-inch vinyl of "Cool Me Down" with the album's third single "Heartbeat" as the A-side.

== Krajowe Eliminacje 2016 ==
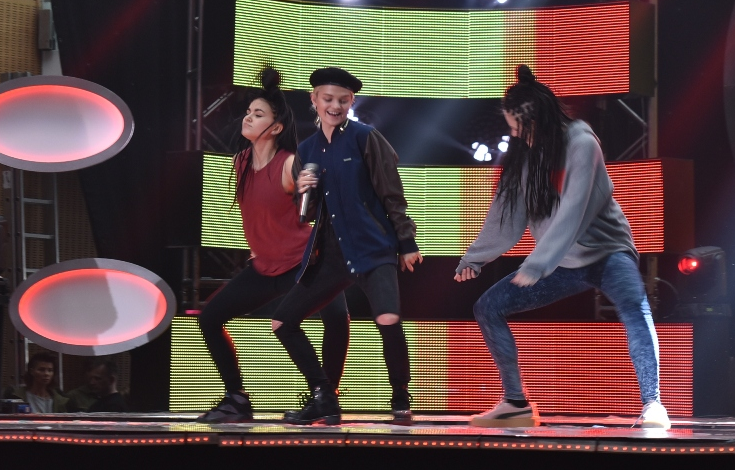
Margaret (centre) during Krajowe Eliminacje 2016 rehearsals

In November 2015, Margaret with producers and songwriters Wrethov, Arash, and Uhlmann were in a recording studio working on a song. Eurowizja.org later reported that Polish broadcaster Telewizja Polska (TVP) approached and selected Margaret internally to represent Poland in Eurovision Song Contest 2016, and "Cool Me Down" was written specifically for the contest. Graphics to announce her as Poland's representative were reportedly finalised. However, the decision to select Polish entry for the contest in a national final was made last minute by new TVP chairman Jacek Kurski who took over in January 2016.

On 16 February 2016, TVP confirmed that Margaret was one of the nine artists selected to participate in the final of Krajowe Eliminacje 2016 with "Cool Me Down". Margaret quickly became bookmakers' and Eurovision fans' favourite to win both the national final and the Eurovision Song Contest. She performed the song in Krajowe Eliminacje's final on 5 March, and finished in second place. Margaret later said: "That was a lot of pressure and it was a big lesson for me. I don't feel that music and artists should be ranked in any way. It's not like in sport. Someone will get to the end faster, or jump higher. You can't compare music. You just like it or not."

== Reception and accolades ==
The song received positive reviews from music critics. Deban Aderemi and Antranig Shokayan of Eurovision blog Wiwibloggs both praised "Cool Me Down" in their reviews. Aderemi wrote that "lyrically the song is on point, whilst its parent sound pulses over an infectious diffraction of modern beats." Shokayan asserted that "'Cool Me Down' is a lyrical masterpiece. Lyrically, it's one of my favourite songs ever – so fierce and catchy". He added that "Margaret's voice is exceptional, the composition is extraordinary and this has Eurovision winner written all over." In a positive review, Idolator' Mike Wass commented that "the newcomer [Margaret] pulls off an Eva Simons-like miracle – remember "Silly Boy" – by beating Rihanna at her own game," concluding that "this ["Cool Me Down"] could work stateside."

Ellie Chalkley of ESC Insight analysed the song and its "real, tangible, and long lasting" impact on the Eurovision Song Contest a year after its release. She argued that "Poland's loss is the path forward for the Song Contest", and that "even without getting to the competition proper, 'Cool Me Down' might turn out to be one of the most influential Eurovision songs in recent years". Chalkley further explained that the song "exists at a pop-cultural tipping point and the ways in which Margaret's stomper succeeded and failed could affect the sound of the contest for years to come." "Cool Me Down" was ranked 40th on Popjustice' "Top 45 Singles of 2016" list. Popjustice described it as "the song everyone wanted the Rihanna comeback single to sound like." The song was nominated for Best Hit at the 2016 Eska Music Awards.

== Commercial performance ==
In Poland, "Cool Me Down" peaked at number four, becoming Margaret's first Polish top-five single. It was certified two-times platinum by the Polish Society of the Phonographic Industry (ZPAV) on 15 June 2016. The track placed 41st on the year-end list of most popular songs on Polish radio stations in 2016 published by ZPAV. Outside of Poland, the single debuted on Sverigetopplistan in Sweden at number 74 on 29 April 2016, and remained there for 18 weeks until 26 August. It peaked at number 36 in its sixth week, and was certified gold by the Swedish Recording Industry Association (GLF) on 10 June 2016. The song also reached number 96 on the German Airplay Chart, number 22 in Romania, and number 180 in the Commonwealth of Independent States.

== Music video ==
A lyric video for "Cool Me Down" was created by Bogna Kowalczyk, and was released on 18 February 2016. It was viewed over 11 million times within two months of its premiere. On 17 May 2016, the song's official music video, directed by Olga Czyżykiewicz, was released. It was shot over a two-day period. On the first day, the filming took place at the Jeziorsko reservoir, Poland, and the next day the filming moved to post-industrial interiors where Margaret was accompanied by 20 dancers. The music video depicts two classical elements: water and fire. It features pyrotechnics and visual effects (a computer-generated whale appears in one scene), and Margaret is seen performing multiple dance sequences including a dance sequence on water reminiscent of TLC's 1995 music video for "Waterfalls". She is also seen dancing at the centre of a circle of flames. In 2022, Margaret revealed that the final cut of the video, which included the visual effects, was released without her approval, and she does not like it.

== Live performances and other usage ==
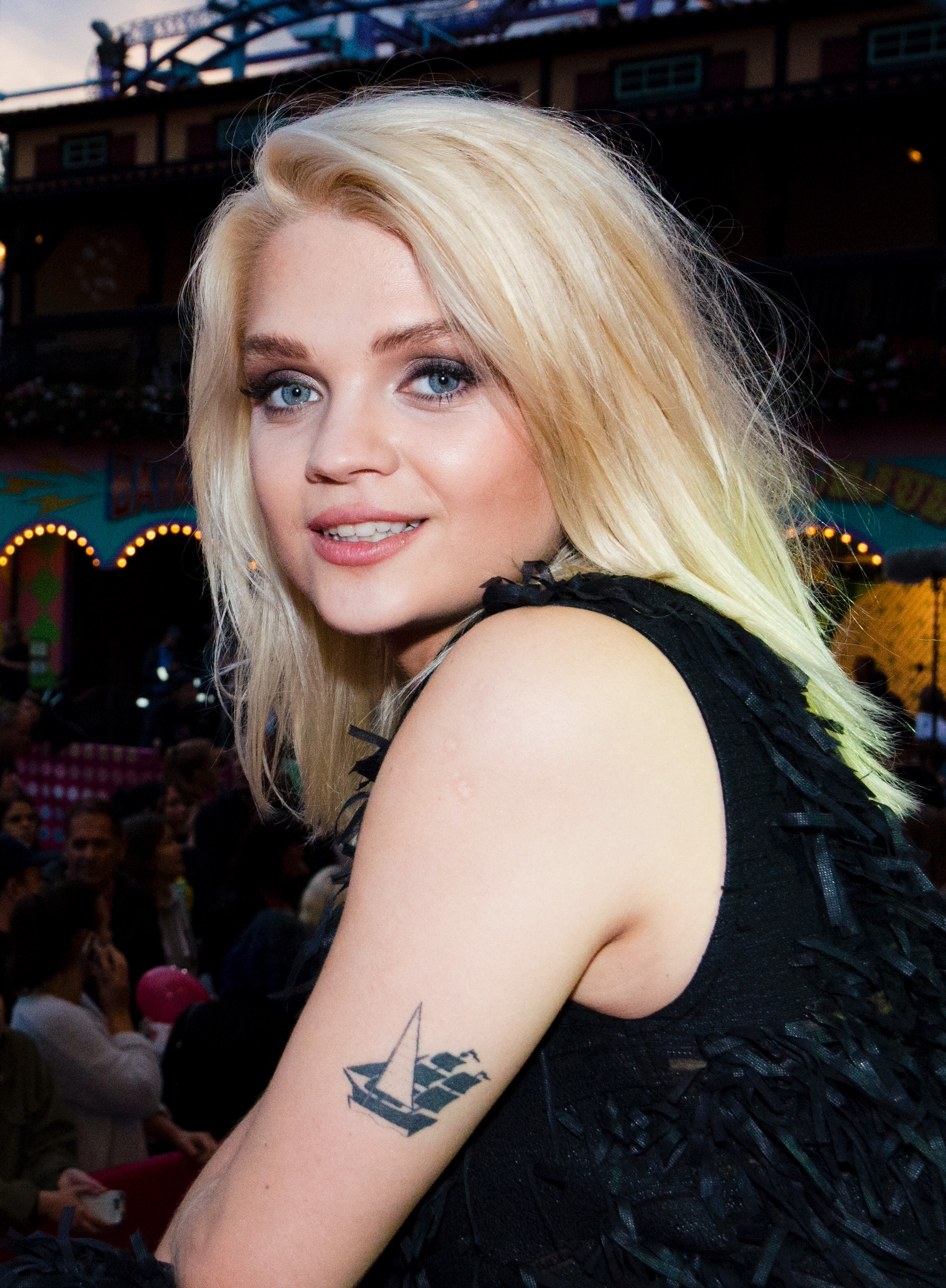
Margaret on Sommarkrysset where she performed "Cool Me Down"

Margaret performed the song for the first time on 26 February 2016 on Świat się kręci. Her performance received mixed reviews, with much criticism towards her voice; she was reported to have been ill that day. She promoted the single extensively in Poland throughout 2016 with numerous live performances, including on Dancing with the Stars: Taniec z gwiazdami, at Eska Music Awards, and at Polsat SuperHit Festival. To promote the single in Sweden, she played shows during July and August 2016, including televised performances on Sommarkrysset ("Summercross"), Lotta på Liseberg ("Lotta at Liseberg") and during Rockbjörnen ("The Rock Bear") awards ceremony. "Cool Me Down" was also included on the set list of Margaret's 2019 Gaja Hornby Tour. A live recording of the song from Margaret's MTV Unplugged concert special was released on its accompanying live album in 2023.

In 2016, Liam "Liamoo" Cacatian covered "Cool Me Down" on the 12th season of Sweden's version of Idol. That November, Jenifer Brening released "Party Shore". The song draws many similarities to "Cool Me Down", which prompted some fans to make plagiarism accusations against Brening on social media. "Cool Me Down" was also covered by Ola Leśniewicz, Ewa Novel and Sybilla Sobczyk during "battles" round in season seven of The Voice of Poland (2016), and by Magdalena Janicka during blind auditions of the show's eighth season (2017). The song was used in the third episode of season one of the American drama TV series Famous in Love. In 2018, Adriana Kalska performed it on season 10 of Twoja twarz brzmi znajomo (Polish version of Your Face Sounds Familiar) recreating its music video.

== Track listing ==
- Digital single
1. "Cool Me Down" – 2:59
- Digital EP – Remixes
1. "Cool Me Down" – 2:59
2. "Cool Me Down" (Extended) – 4:32
3. "Cool Me Down" (Mike Candys Remix) – 4:44
4. "Cool Me Down" (Antrox Remix) – 4:21
5. "Cool Me Down" (Decaville Remix) – 4:06
6. "Cool Me Down" (Instrumental) – 3:02
- Digital single – Acoustic
1. "Cool Me Down" (Acoustic) – 3:23
- 7-inch vinyl
1. A. "Heartbeat" – 3:17
2. B. "Cool Me Down" – 2:59

== Credits ==
- Margaret – vocals
- Anderz Wrethov — writer
- Linnea Deb — writer
- Alex "Alex P" Papaconstantinou — writer, producer
- Viktor "Victory" Svensson — writer, producer
- Arash — writer, additional producer
- Robert Uhlmann — writer, additional producer

Credits adapted from Tidal.

== Charts ==
=== Weekly charts ===
Chart (2016)	Peak position
CIS (TopHit)	180
Germany Airplay (BVMI)	96
Poland Airplay (ZPAV)	4
Poland (Dance Top 50)	8
Romania (Airplay 100)	22
Romania Airplay (Media Forest)	14
Sweden (Sverigetopplistan)	36

=== Year-end charts ===
Chart (2016)	Position
Poland (ZPAV)	41

== Certifications ==
Region	Certification	Certified units/sales
Poland (ZPAV)	2× Platinum	40,000^{‡}
Sweden (GLF)	Gold	20,000^{‡}
^{‡} Sales+streaming figures based on certification alone.

== Release history ==
Region	Date	Format	Version	Label	Ref.
Poland	17 February 2016	Contemporary hit radio	Original	Magic Records	
Poland	17 February 2016	Streaming (only Tidal)	Original	Extensive Music; Magic Records	
Poland	19 February 2016	Digital download; streaming	Original	Extensive Music; Magic Records	
Russia	11 March 2016	Digital download; streaming	Original	Broma16	
Poland	15 April 2016	Digital download; streaming	Remixes EP	Extensive Music; Magic Records	
Various	22 April 2016	Digital download; streaming	Original	Warner Music	
Russia	2 May 2016	Digital download; streaming	Remixes EP	Broma16	
Italy	13 May 2016	Contemporary hit radio	Original	Warner Music	
Various	9 September 2016	Digital download; streaming	Remixes EP	Warner Music	
Various	9 December 2016	Digital download; streaming	Acoustic	Warner Music	
Poland	23 December 2016	7-inch vinyl	Original	Magic Records	
