= C-BooL =

Polish DJ and record producer (born 1981)

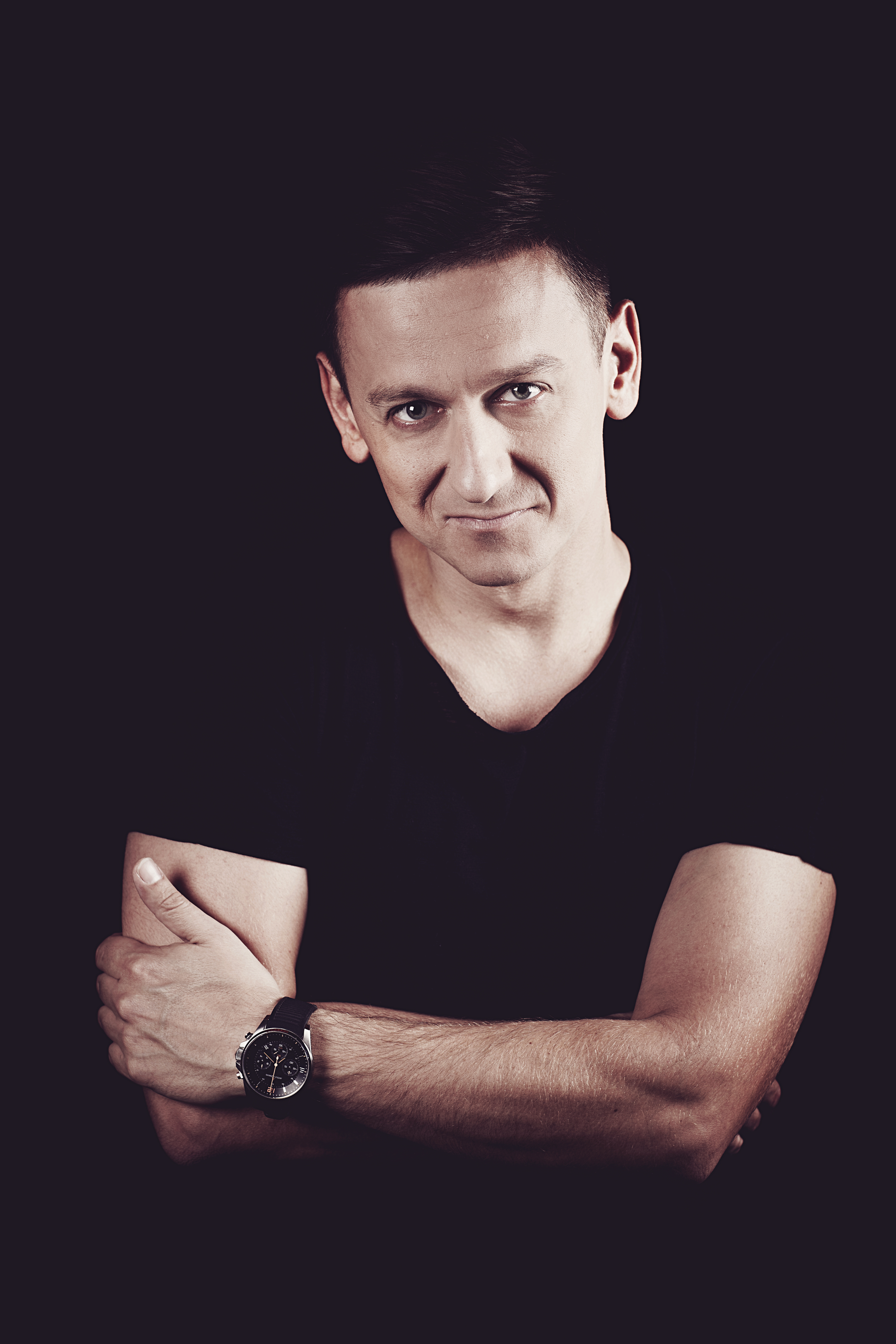
- C-BooL in 2013

Background information
- Born: Grzegorz Cebula; 30 May 1981 (age 45); Pyskowice, Poland
- Genres: House; Electro house; Dance
- Occupations: DJ; record producer; remixer
- Years active: 1998–present
- Label: C-Wave Records

Grzegorz Cebula (born May 30, 1981), better known by his stage name C-BooL, is a Polish DJ and record producer.

== Career ==
His career began in 1998 as a local DJ. The first popular songs in Polish radio were "Would You Feel" and "House Babe". At this time he adopted his stage name. Later, in 2010 he released with singer Isabelle the song "Body & Soul".

In 2016 the single "Never Go Away" was published. The track charted not only in Poland, but also in several other European countries and became his breakthrough song, receiving in Poland a diamond certification as well as a number-one position in Polish airplay charts.

"Never Go Away" as well as "Magic Symphony" were both awarded at the Eska Music Awards. The follow-up singles "DJ Is Your Second Name", "Wonderland" or "Fire In My Head" also were successful.

== Discography ==
=== Album ===
- 8 Years (2011)

=== Singles ===
Title	Year	Peak chart positions						Sales	Certifications	Album
Title	Year	POL	POL (TV Airplay)	RUS	CZE	SVK	UKR	Sales	Certifications	Album
"Would You Feel"	2004	—	—	—	—	—	—			8 Years
"House Babe"	2005	—	—	—	—	—	—			8 Years
"Body & Soul" (featuring Isabelle)	2010	—	1	254	—	—	—			8 Years
"Do You Know"	2012	—	—	—	—	—	—			Non-album singles
"Never Go Away" (featuring Giang Pham)	2016	1	1	4	—	95	—	POL: 100,000	ZPAV: Diamond	Non-album singles
"Magic Symphony" (featuring Giang Pham)	2016	1	1	—	64	—	—	POL: 80,000	ZPAV: 4× Platinum	Non-album singles
"DJ Is Your Second Name" (featuring Giang Pham)	2017	3	4	3	—	—	—	POL: 60,000	ZPAV: 3× Platinum	Non-album singles
"Wonderland"	2018	1	1	—	—	—	—	POL: 100,000	ZPAV: Diamond	Non-album singles
"Fire In My Head" (featuring Cadence XYZ)	2018	4	—	—	—	—	—			Non-album singles
"Catch You"	2019	—	—	3	—	—	23			Non-album singles
"La La Love" (featuring Skytech & Giang Pham)	2019	3	5	—	—	—	—			Non-album singles
"Fight to Win" (featuring Giang Pham)	2022	—	—	—	—	—	—			
"—" denotes a recording that did not chart or was not released in that territory.

=== Remixes ===
Title	Year	Peak chart positions	
Title	Year	POL	POL (TV Airplay)
"Rumors" (R3hab feat. Sofia Carson)	2018	10	5

== Awards and nominations ==
Year	Ceremony	Category	Result
2016	Eska Music Awards	Best Hit ("Never Go Away")	Won
2017	Eska Music Awards	Best Hit ("Magic Symphony")	Won
2017	Eska Music Awards	Best DJ/Producer	Nominated
2017	Polsat SuperHit Festiwal	Radio Hit of the Year	2nd place
