= Margaret (singer) =

Polish singer and songwriter (born 1991)

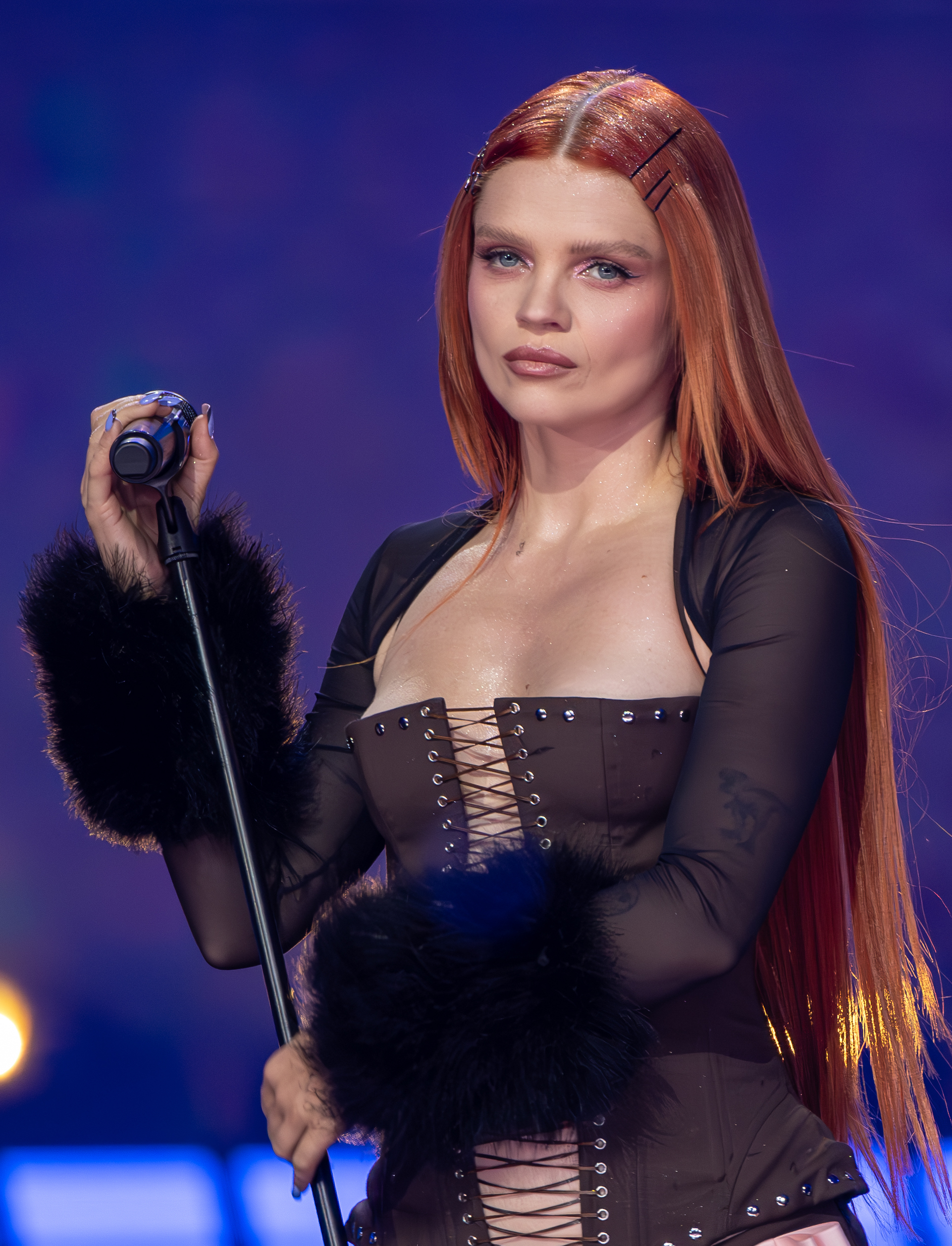
- Margaret in 2024
- Born: Małgorzata Jamroży; 30 June 1991 (age 35); Stargard Szczeciński, Poland
- Other names: Gaja Hornby; Maggie
- Occupations: Singer; songwriter
- Years active: 2006–present
- Works: Discography; songs
- Spouse: Piotr Kozieradzki (m. 2020)
- Awards: Full list
- Musical career
- Genres: Pop; urban contemporary
- Instrument: Vocals
- Labels: Extensive; Gaja Hornby; Magic; Warner; Sony

Małgorzata Jamroży (Polish: [mawɡɔˈʐata jamˈrɔʐɨ]; born 30 June 1991), known professionally as Margaret, is a Polish singer and songwriter. Before achieving mainstream success, she was a member of underground bands, recorded soundtracks for television commercials and films, and ran a fashion blog. Through her blog, she was discovered by a talent agent who helped her secure a record deal with Extensive Music in 2012. She rose to prominence the following year with the single "Thank You Very Much", which charted in several European countries.

Under her contract with Extensive Music, Margaret released two studio albums: Add the Blonde (2014) and Monkey Business (2017). Both records reached the top 10 on the Polish charts, and spawned the singles "Wasted", "Start a Fire", "Heartbeat", "What You Do", and "Byle jak". She also collaborated with Matt Dusk on the jazz album Just the Two of Us (2015). After signing an international record deal with Warner Music in 2016, Margaret released the single "Cool Me Down", gaining particular recognition in Sweden. She subsequently participated in the country's music competition Melodifestivalen with the songs "In My Cabana" and "Tempo" in 2018 and 2019, respectively. Seeking artistic freedom, she parted ways with her record label and management in 2019, and eschewed mainstream pop for urban music on the Polish-language albums Gaja Hornby (2019) and Maggie Vision (2021), the latter becoming her highest-charting record to date. Following this genre shift, Margaret returned to radio-friendly pop with the albums Siniaki i cekiny (2024) and Tripolar (2026); the former yielded the chart-topping single "Tańcz głupia".

Margaret has received numerous accolades, including four MTV Europe Music Awards for Best Polish Act—more than any other artist in this category–five Eska Music Awards, and a Kids' Choice Award. She was included on Forbes Poland's 2014 list of the 100 most valuable stars of Polish show business, and on Wprost's 2015 list of the 50 most influential Polish celebrities. Alongside her music career, Margaret has endorsed numerous products, served as a coach on The Voice of Poland in 2019 and 2025, and co-founded the record label Gaja Hornby Records with her husband Kacezet in 2020.

== Early life and education ==
Małgorzata Jamroży was born on 30 June 1991 in Stargard Szczeciński, Poland, to teachers Ryszard and Elżbieta Jamroży. She has an older brother named Tomasz, a chemist who is four years her senior, with whom she grew up in Ińsko. Her brother was also a professional sled dog racer, and the family ran a husky farm. One of her grandmothers is of Lithuanian descent. Jamroży was raised Catholic, and upon being confirmed, took Julita as her confirmation name.

As a child, Jamroży participated in many singing contests. She attended the Ińsko school complex—a primary school and gymnasium—and initially studied clarinet before switching to saxophone at the Ignacy Jan Paderewski First Degree State Music School in Choszczno. Shortly after finishing music school, her nasal septum was damaged in a bicycle accident, which temporarily prevented her from playing the instrument. At age 16, she moved to Szczecin, where she graduated from high school. She also started taking private singing lessons from jazz teacher of the Katowice Academy of Music Justyna Motylska, and from vocal coach Elżbieta Zapendowska. At this time, she adopted the stage name Margaret, the English-language equivalent of Małgorzata.

At 18, Margaret moved to Warsaw, where she unsuccessfully auditioned for a place at a jazz school, having been rejected due to a droopy eyelid she experiences while singing. She later embarked on an English studies degree at the University of Social Sciences and Humanities but left after three semesters. In 2015, she graduated from the Warsaw International School of Costume and Fashion Design, majoring in fashion design.

== Career ==
=== 2006–2012: Career beginnings ===
In 2006, Margaret appeared on the Polish television talent show Szansa na Sukces ("A Chance for Success"), performing Stenia Kozłowska's song "Będę czekać" ("I'll Be Waiting"), and received a special mention. She returned to the programme in 2009, winning an episode with her performance of Monika Brodka's song "Znam Cię na pamięć" ("I Know You by Heart"). As a result, she advanced to the show's 2009 final at the Congress Hall in Warsaw. In high school, she performed in a rock band called Walizka ("Suitcase"), and in the band oNieboLepiej ("Much Better") with whom she sang poetry.

In 2010, Margaret appeared in the musical Rent at the Szczecin Opera in the Castle. That year, she also co-founded the Margaret J. Project, an electropop six-piece band with R&B and hip-hop influences, which she formed with music producer and bassist Adam Kabaciński. The group qualified for the semi-finals of the 2010 Coke Live Fresh Noise competition. After disbanding in November 2012, their previously unreleased studio album This Is Margaret was made available online in 2013. In 2011, Margaret launched a fashion blog that featured videos of her singing. Her blogging activity declined as her music career progressed. Early in her career, Margaret also recorded soundtracks for Polish television commercials and films, including "Moments" and "It Will Be Lovely Day". The latter was released for digital download in July 2012 under Margaret's birth name, and received radio airplay. According to Polish music manager Maja Sablewska, while Margaret was not well-known at the time, her voice was "ubiquitous".

=== 2012–2013: Breakthrough with "Thank You Very Much" ===
While Margaret was blogging, she was approached by talent agent and her future manager Sławomir Berdowski, who became interested in working with her after hearing her recording of Adele's song "Right as Rain". Berdowski arranged for Margaret to work with music producers Thomas Karlsson, Joakim Buddee and Ant Whiting, who wrote her debut single "Thank You Very Much". Shortly after recording the song, Margaret signed with the Swedish record label Extensive Music. The label also signed a distribution deal with Universal Music Poland's Magic Records to release Margaret's music in Poland. In May 2012, Margaret debuted "Thank You Very Much" at the 2012 Sopot TOPtrendy festival, and the song was released to Polish contemporary hit radio. Shortly thereafter, Margaret's management decided to remove the song from radio playlists and develop a promotional plan before re-releasing it.

"Thank You Very Much" and its music video were released for digital download in February 2013. The song achieved commercial success in Poland, becoming the country's third-best-selling Polish digital single of 2013. Margaret worked with director Chris Piliero on the track's music video, which featured her surrounded by 30 nude extras. The video was removed by YouTube for violating the site's policy against nudity and sexual content, but was later restored with age restrictions. Following this, Margaret expressed her support for the right to nudity under the slogan "Liberty, Equality, Fraternity," and criticised YouTube for censorship. The video received substantial media coverage, which contributed to the international success of "Thank You Very Much". A year after its release, the video was featured on the website 9GAG, which led to a surge in its YouTube traffic, resulting in a gain of more than 500,000 views within 24 hours. In June 2013, Margaret travelled to Germany to promote "Thank You Very Much" with a live performance on ZDF Fernsehgarten ("ZDF Television Garden"). After her appearance on the show, the single peaked at number 38 in Austria and at number 41 in Germany.

Margaret's second single, "Tell Me How Are Ya", was released in July 2013 on her first extended play (EP), All I Need, which reached number 50 on the Polish albums chart. She represented Poland at the July 2013 Baltic Song Contest in Sweden, where she performed "Thank You Very Much" and an EP track, "I Get Along", finishing second out of ten competitors. Margaret was nominated in several categories at the 2013 Eska Music Awards, including Best Female Artist, Best Debut, Best Hit, and Best Music Video (both for "Thank You Very Much"), and won the latter. She was also nominated for Best Polish Act at the 2013 MTV Europe Music Awards. In December 2013, Margaret embarked on a promotional tour of Italy, where "Thank You Very Much" peaked at number 22 on the official singles chart.

=== 2014–2016: Add the Blonde, Just the Two of Us and "Cool Me Down" ===
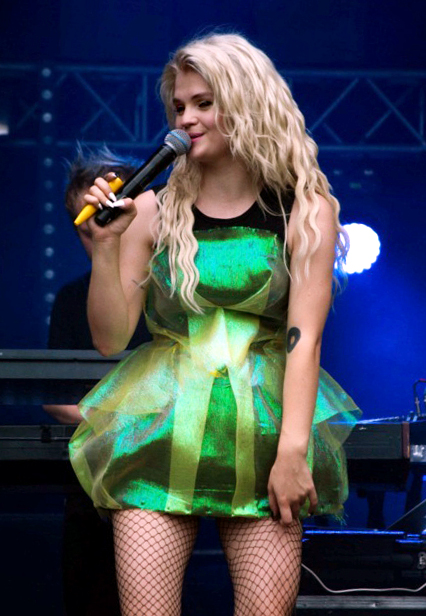
Margaret at the 2014 Grupa Azoty Grand Festival in Tarnów, Poland

In January 2014, Margaret released "Wasted" as the lead single from her first studio album, Add the Blonde. The song reached number six in Poland. In February, she appeared in the first of several advertising campaigns for Play, a Polish telecommunications provider. Add the Blonde was released in August 2014, containing all songs from Margaret's 2013 EP All I Need and eight new tracks. A pop record, it was influenced by retro-disco and ska, as well as the work of Madonna. The album reached number eight in Poland and was certified platinum by the Polish Society of the Phonographic Industry (ZPAV). The same month, Margaret released "Start a Fire" as the official song of the 2014 FIVB Volleyball Men's World Championship. She performed it at the tournament's opening ceremony. The song also became the second single from Add the Blonde and peaked at number 10 in Poland. Around this time, she recorded a cover of Katarzyna Sobczyk's song "O mnie się nie martw" ("Don't You Worry About Me"), which was used as the theme song for the Polish television series of the same name. Margaret was also featured on a 2014 Christmas charity album called Siemacha po kolędzie ("Siemacha After Carolling"), recorded in support of the Siemacha Association. Its 2015 follow-up, Gwiazdy po kolędzie ("Stars After Carolling"), included two songs recorded by Margaret. The third single from Add the Blonde, "Heartbeat", was released in February 2015 and charted at number 11 in Poland.

In early 2015, it was reported that Margaret had been cast in the role of Polish singer Violetta Villas for her biopic. Margaret's manager dismissed these reports at the time, but added that if an offer were made Margaret would consider it. Due to her resemblance to Villas in her youth, the media continued to speculate about her involvement in the project. Villas's son, Krzysztof Gospodarek, expressed a desire for Margaret to portray his mother, citing their likeness as the reason. In 2018, it was revealed that the role had been offered to Margaret a year earlier, but she turned it down. She later explained that she had decided against accepting it because she does not identify with Villas.

In August 2015, Margaret won two Eska Music Awards: Best Female Artist and Best Artist on the Internet. She became the co-host of the musical television show Retromania, which debuted on TVP1 that September. The show was cancelled after two months. In September, fashion retailer Sinsay launched a clothing line designed by Margaret named "Sinsay by Margaret". At the 2015 MTV Europe Music Awards, she won the award for Best Polish Act and was nominated for Best European Act. In November 2015, she released her second studio album, Just the Two of Us, a collaboration with Canadian jazz singer Matt Dusk, consisting of their interpretations of jazz standards. To prepare for its recording, Margaret listened to recordings by Ella Fitzgerald, whom she has cited as an influence. Margaret explained that she made a jazz record to fulfil her dream and had no intention of giving up her pop career. Just the Two of Us was promoted with two singles: the title track and "'Deed I Do". The album reached number 28 in Poland and received a platinum certification from ZPAV. It won a Róże Gali award ("Gala's Roses") in the Music category. Margaret also appeared in two Polish Coca-Cola advertising campaigns that year, performing covers of two songs. One of them, the Polish-language version of the Christmas song "Wonderful Dream (Holidays Are Coming)" titled "Coraz bliżej święta", reached number 32 in Poland upon its release and has re-entered the Polish charts each holiday season since, peaking at number 15 in 2024. She was also featured in Deichmann's Autumn/Winter 2015 Polish advertising campaign and by March 2018 had appeared in five more commercials.

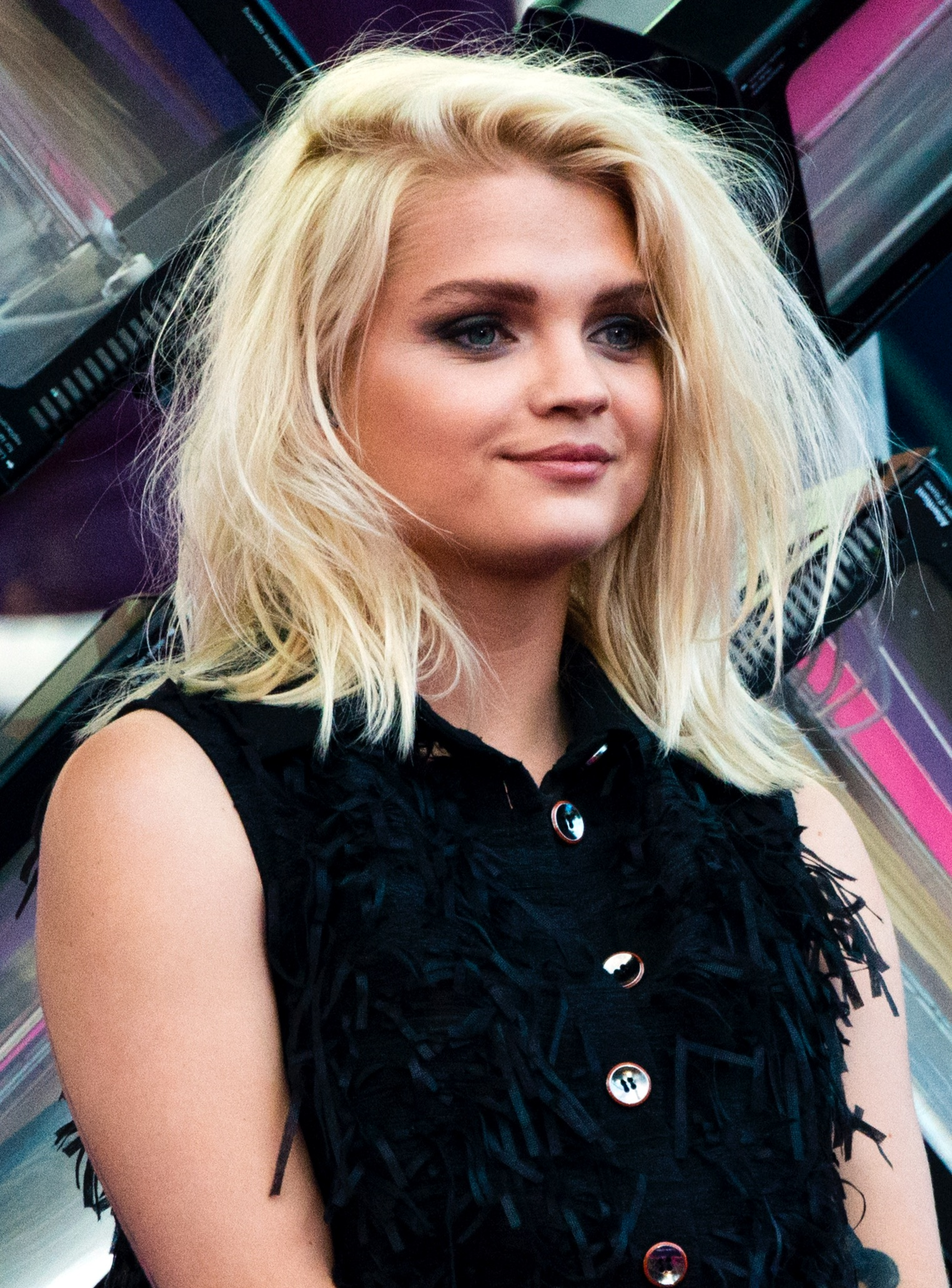
Margaret on Sommarkrysset in July 2016

In February 2016, Polish broadcaster Telewizja Polska (TVP) announced that Margaret would compete in Krajowe Eliminacje 2016 ("National Eliminations 2016"), Poland's national final for the Eurovision Song Contest 2016, with the song "Cool Me Down". Margaret quickly became bookmakers' and Eurovision fans' favourite to win both the national final and the Eurovision Song Contest, but in the final of Krajowe Eliminacje in March she finished in second place. Reflecting on the experience, Margaret later remarked: "That was a lot of pressure and it was a big lesson for me. I don't feel that music and artists should be ranked in any way. It's not like in sport. Someone will get to the end faster, or jump higher. You can't compare music. You just like it or not." Ellie Chalkley of ESC Insight analysed the song's impact on the Eurovision Song Contest in 2017, describing it as "real, tangible, and long lasting". She wrote that "even without getting to the competition proper, 'Cool Me Down' might turn out to be one of the most influential Eurovision songs in recent years" and added that "it exists at a pop-cultural tipping point and the ways in which Margaret's stomper succeeded and failed could affect the sound of the contest for years to come".

"Cool Me Down" reached number four in Poland, becoming Margaret's first Polish top-five single, and was certified two-times platinum by ZPAV. In March 2016, Margaret won the Kids' Choice Award for Favourite Polish Star. The following month, she signed an international record deal with Warner Music Group and released "Cool Me Down" in various territories. The single peaked at number 36 in the Swedish charts and received a gold certification from the Swedish Recording Industry Association (GLF). Its success in Sweden allowed Margaret to tour the country in 2016, and she made televised appearances on Sommarkrysset ("Summercross"), Lotta på Liseberg ("Lotta at Liseberg"), and at the Rockbjörnen ("The Rock Bear") awards ceremony. At the 2016 Eska Music Awards, Margaret premiered the song "Elephant" and won her second consecutive award for Best Artist on the Internet. "Elephant" was released as a single on 27 August and charted at number 21 in Poland. Margaret won her second consecutive MTV Europe Music Award for Best Polish Act in November. Both "Cool Me Down" and "Elephant" were included on the reissue of Add the Blonde released in December 2016.

=== 2017–2019: Monkey Business and Melodifestivalen ===
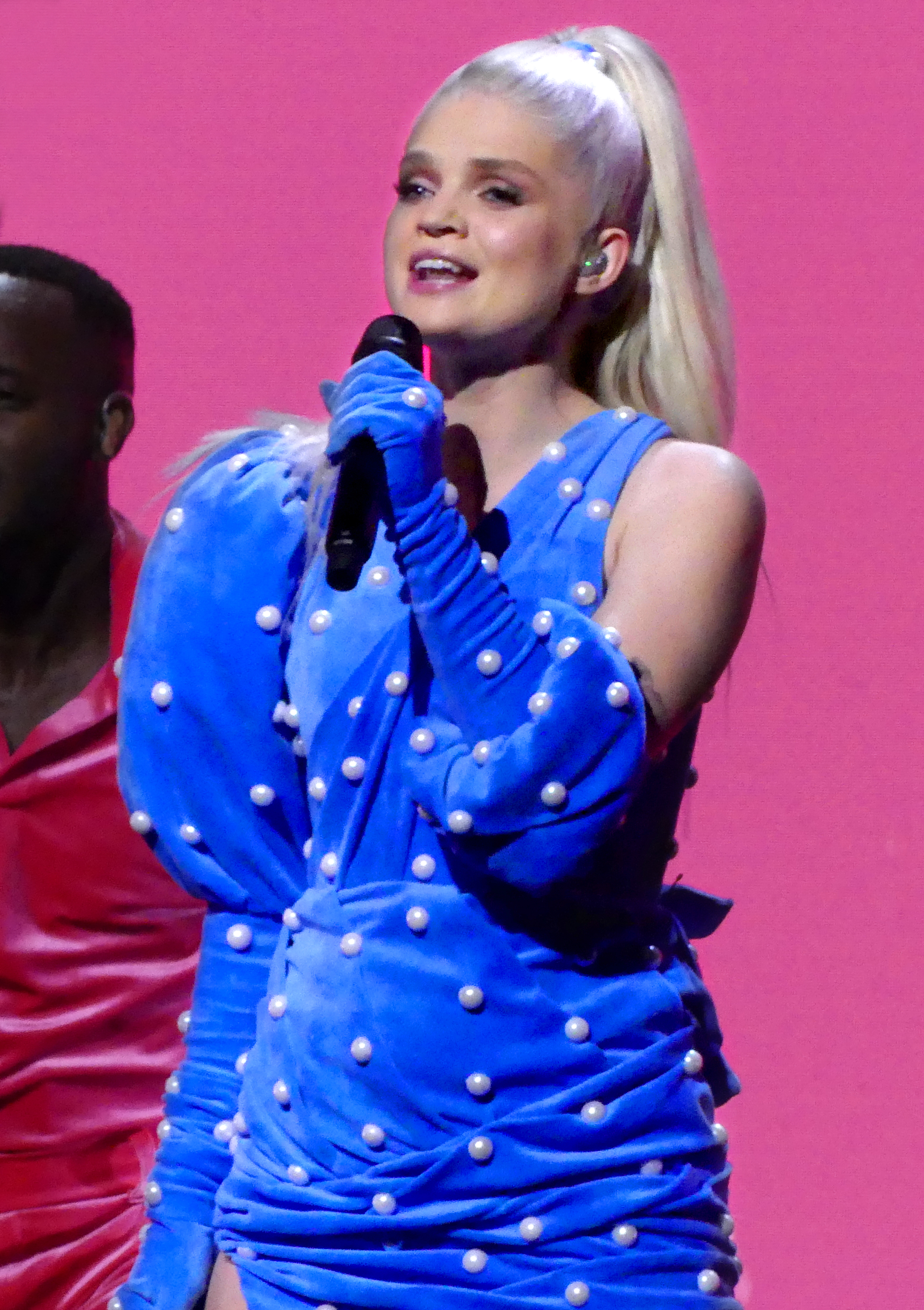
Margaret during her Melodifestivalen 2019 semi-final performance

While working on her third studio album Monkey Business, Margaret voiced Smurfstorm in the Polish-language version of the 2017 animated feature film Smurfs: The Lost Village. To promote the film, she released the song "Blue Vibes" in March 2017. The following month, she signed an advertising deal with Semilac, a Polish brand of nail products. Monkey Business was released in June 2017 and peaked at number eight in Poland. Margaret described the album as "versatile" and said that she had more artistic control over its production than on her debut album, noting that she was in charge whereas with Add the Blonde, she had acted on the advice of her producers. Monkey Business was preceded by the single "What You Do", released in May, which reached number 14 in Poland. In May, Margaret also collaborated with Swedish group VAX on their single "6 in the Morning". She won her third consecutive Eska Music Award for Best Artist on the Internet in June 2017. In September, she received the TVP1 Special Award at the 2017 National Festival of Polish Song. The second single from Monkey Business, "Byle jak" ("Anyhow"), was released in December 2017 and reached number six in Poland.

In 2018, Margaret became the first Polish artist to compete in Melodifestivalen, Sweden's national selection for the Eurovision Song Contest, with the song "In My Cabana". She said she was invited to take part in the competition by the show's producer Christer Björkman, who had seen her perform on Swedish television. Björkman later referred to her as "incredibly starlike". With her participation, she aimed to promote her music in Sweden and present herself to a broader Swedish audience, stating that in her opinion a Swedish artist should represent Sweden at Eurovision. Margaret performed in the second semi-final of the competition in February 2018 and advanced to the Andra chansen ("Second chance") round. She ultimately qualified for the final, where she finished in seventh place with 103 points. "In My Cabana" was released on the day of her semi-final performance, and charted at number three in Poland and at number eight in Sweden.

Following her participation in Melodifestivalen, Margaret appeared in a promotional campaign for new products from Warka Radler, a line of non-alcoholic beers by the Warka Brewery. In August 2018, she supported Europride by releasing a single titled "Lollipop", which served as Warner Music Sweden's anthem for the event. Margaret commented on her involvement in the project, saying: "I have always supported love initiatives and love of all kinds. Love is Love." In November, she received her third MTV Europe Music Award for Best Polish Act, becoming the most-awarded artist in this category to date. She returned to Melodifestivalen in February 2019 with the song "Tempo", finishing fifth in the second semi-final, which resulted in her elimination from the competition. "Tempo" charted at number 7 in Poland and at number 43 in Sweden. Margaret also made a cameo appearance as Gaja Hornby in the 2019 Polish romantic comedy Całe szczęście ("Their Lucky Stars"), and recorded a song of the same name for its soundtrack.

=== 2019–2021: Independence and genre shift with Gaja Hornby and Maggie Vision ===
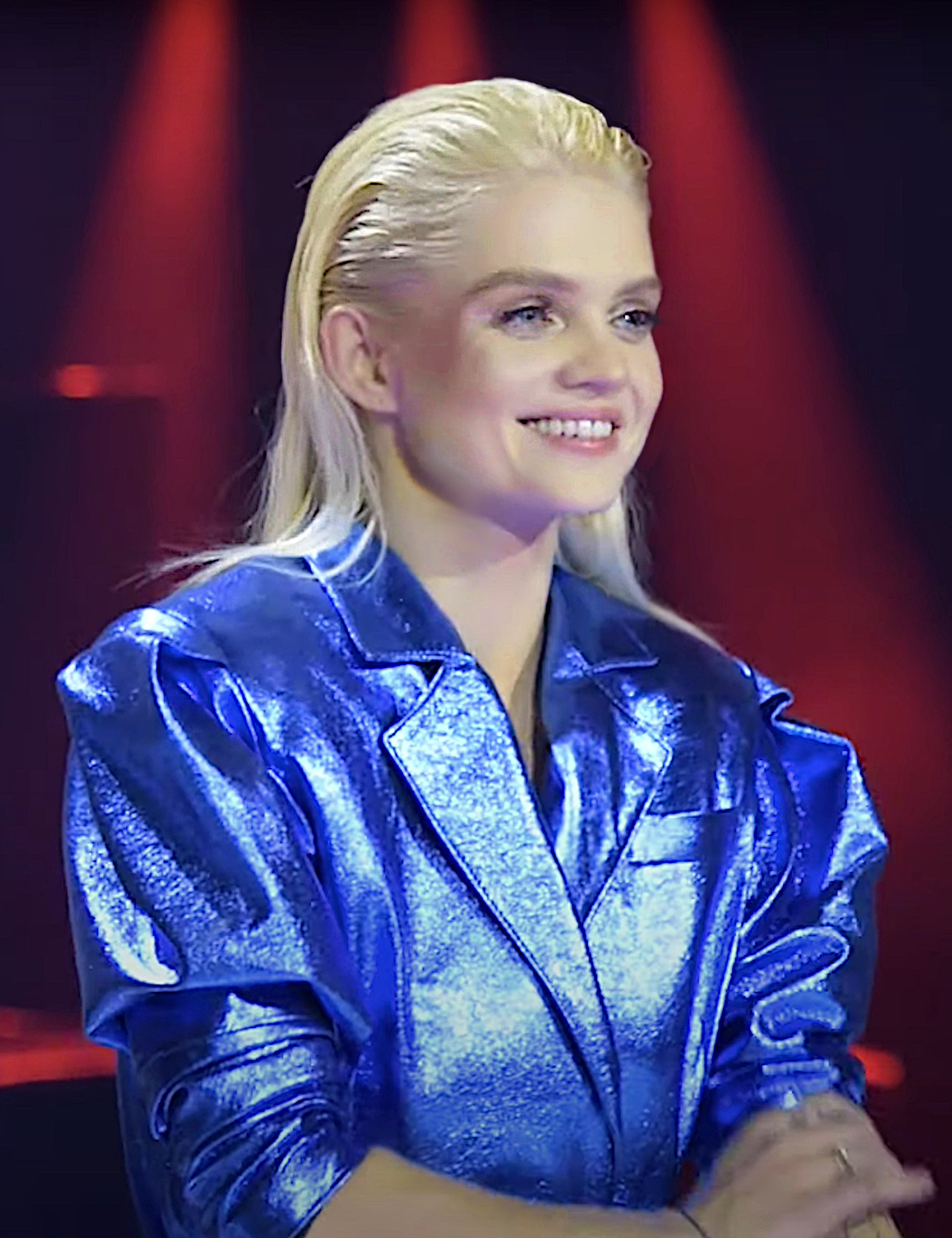
Margaret on The Voice of Poland in 2019

Margaret's fourth studio album, Gaja Hornby, marked her new artistic direction, which she felt had more musical and lyrical depth. A departure from bubblegum pop she was previously known for, it incorporated a more urban sound than her earlier work. The album was her first Polish-language record, and she co-wrote every track. Gaja Hornby was named after her alter ego. It was released in May 2019 and charted in Poland at number 13. Reviewing the album, Jarek Szubrycht of Gazeta Wyborcza praised Margaret's artistic growth and the work of the Polish producers she enlisted for the record, noting that they played a key role in shaping its sound. Gaja Hornby earned Margaret a Fryderyk nomination for Album of the Year – Pop. The album's title track was released as its first single in April 2019, followed by "Serce Baila" ("Heart Dances") in June, "Chwile bez słów" ("Moments Without Words"; featuring Kacezet) in July, and "Ej chłopaku" ("Hey Boy") in September. In July, Margaret collaborated with Polish rapper Young Igi on his single "Układanki" ("Jigsaws"), which was certified two-times platinum in Poland. She served as a coach on the 10th season of The Voice of Poland from September to November 2019. Her final act, Tadeusz Seibert, came in third place. Margaret embarked on her Gaja Hornby Tour in October 2019. Around this time, she officially parted ways with her record label and management and terminated her international record deal with Warner Music as she decided to take control of her own career.

Margaret announced an indefinite hiatus in December 2019 due to health problems. She later revealed that after her stint on The Voice she struggled with depression and also underwent surgery for an ovarian cyst. In February 2020, she co-founded the record label Gaja Hornby Records with her husband, musician Kacezet. The label officially launched in November 2021 as a subsidiary of Sony Music Entertainment Poland. After a three-month hiatus, Margaret broke her silence in March 2020, announcing her collaboration with cancer charity Rak'n'Roll Foundation. She raised 20,000 zł (€5,000 as of March 2020) through an online fundraiser for the charity, and released the single "Nowe Plemię" ("New Tribe") on 19 March as part of their Rak'n'Roll Music project. With the release of the song, it was announced that she had signed with Sony Music Entertainment Poland. At the 2020 MTV Europe Music Awards, she extended her record as the most-awarded artist in the Best Polish Act category, winning for the fourth time.

Margaret's fifth studio album, Maggie Vision, a combination of hip-hop and urban pop, was released on 12 February 2021. It received positive reviews, with some critics calling it her best album to date. The record debuted at number five in the Polish charts. It was supported by nine singles: "Nowe Plemię"; "Przebiśniegi" ("Snowdrops"); "Reksiu" with Otsochodzi; "Roadster" with Kizo; "Fotel" ("Armchair"); "Xanax"; "No Future" with Kukon, released in recognition of the 2020 women's strike protests in Poland; "Antipop" with Kara; and "Sold Out" with Natalia Szroeder. Both "Reksiu" and "Roadster" were certified gold in Poland, with the former's music video also earning a Fryderyk nomination. On 2 July 2021, Margaret released the EP Gelato, which featured two singles: "Tak na oko" and the title track on which she collaborated with Polish rapper Tymek. The former peaked at number 18 in Poland and was certified platinum in the country. Margaret embarked on her second headlining concert tour, the Maggie Vision Tour, in October 2021. In addition to solo material, she featured on several tracks in 2021, including 1988's single "Bajkał" with Kacha, a remix of Rasmentalism's song "Numer" for the deluxe edition of their album Geniusz, and RIP Scotty and Leeo's single "CandyFlip". She also appeared on Bartek Deryło's song "Zima" from his debut album Latawce, Urboishawty's single "Kocha", and Team X's Christmas song "Pod choinką".

=== 2022–2025: Zadra, club2020, MTV Unplugged and Siniaki i cekiny ===
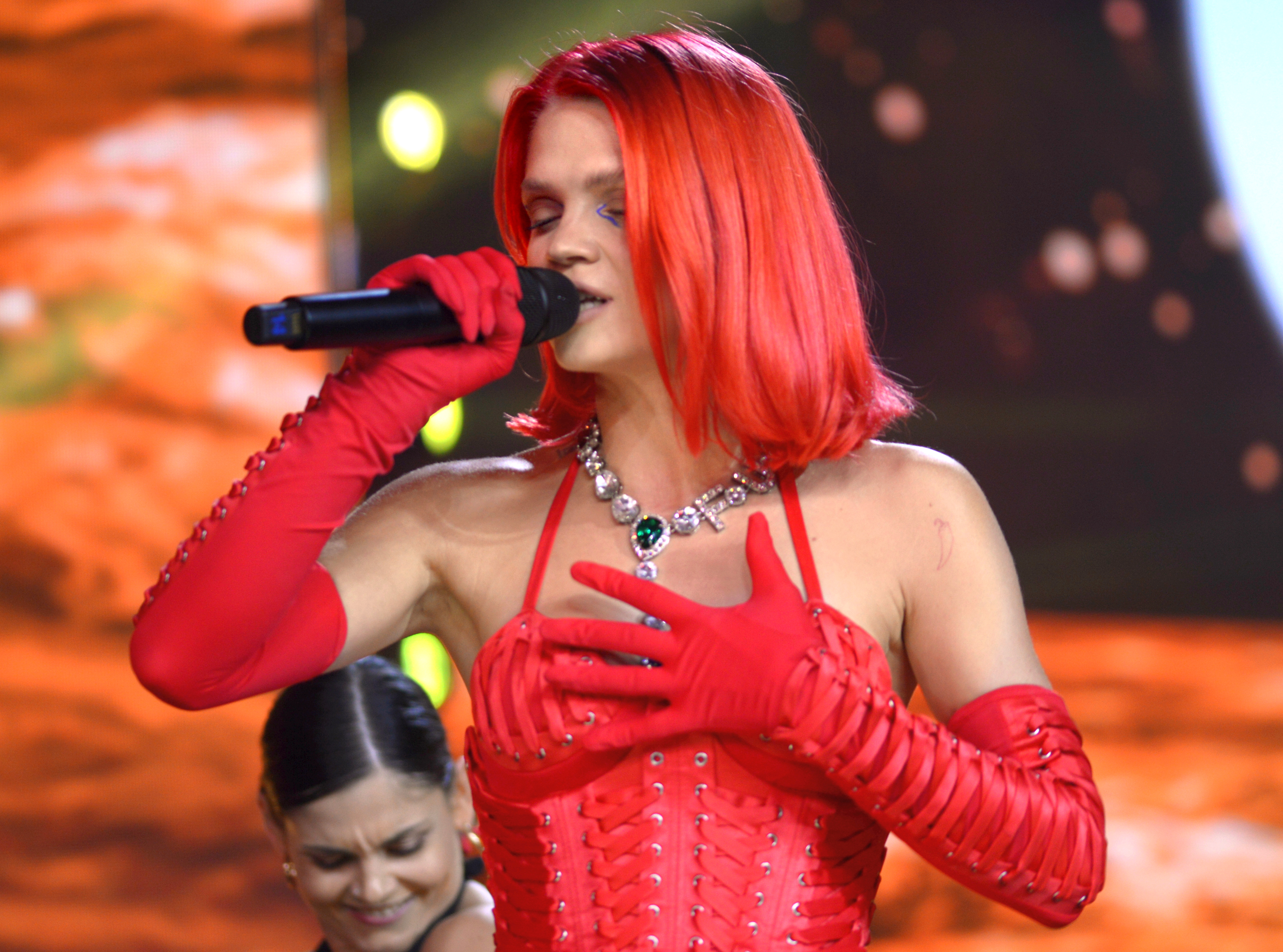
Margaret at the 2022 Top of the Top Sopot Festival

In 2022, Margaret released the singles "Cry in My Gucci", "Vino", and "Niespokojne morze", respectively, in May, June and August. The last of these peaked at number 28 in Poland, and was certified platinum by ZPAV. That year, she also collaborated with Anja Pham on the single "Oversize" in February, with Pedro, Francis and Beteo on their single "Hood Love (a ja nie)" in July, and with Włodi on the cover of Republika's song "Mamona" in September. Margaret wrote two songs for Viki Gabor's 2022 second studio album ID: "Lollipop" and "Cute", and also featured on the latter. Aside from her music endeavours, she starred in the 2022 radio drama series titled Niech to usłyszą produced by Radio ZET, playing a kidnapped singer named Maggie. Margaret also made her cinematic debut that year, starring as Justi in the Polish musical film Zadra. The film premiered at the Polish Film Festival in September 2022, where it competed in the main competition, before being released theatrically in March 2023. The experience of working on the film inspired her to pursue more acting projects in the future.

Margaret began 2023 by collaborating with Janusz Walczuk on the song "Showbiznes" from his second studio album, Jan Walczuk. As part of the hip-hop collective club2020, she appeared on five tracks from their eponymous album that March, and released her third EP, Urbano Futuro, shortly after. The former spawned two singles featuring Margaret: "Cypher2022" and "Deszcz", while the latter yielded the singles "Początek", "VIP" and "Mniejsza o to" which feature Walczuk, Hanafi and Waima, respectively. club2020 debuted at number one in Poland and became the eighth best-selling album of 2023 in the country. Margaret also recorded a performance for the MTV Unplugged concert special, inspired by Buena Vista Social Club, with guest appearances from Kayah and Otsochodzi. It premiered on Canal+ Premium on 23 April 2023, followed by an accompanying live album three days later.

Also in 2023, Margaret featured on Paulina Przybysz's song "Koniec" from her album Wracając, and recorded two songs for the music project Babie Lato: "Cudowne lata" with Natalia Kukulska, Mery Spolsky, Bovska and Zalia and a cover of Shocking Blue's song "Venus" with Kukulska, Bovska and Zalia. That June, she joined club2020 on the main stage of Open'er Festival for the group's only live performance, and a month later, she served as the opening act for the Polish date of Pink's Summer Carnival. Margaret collaborated with Polish hip-hop duo Miętha on their single "Goń" in September 2023, and toured Poland with MTV Unplugged through October. She recorded the Christmas song "Może zaczniemy w święta" and narrated the Polish-language version of the nature documentary film Whale Nation, both in December 2023. The same month, the Warsaw Prosecutor's Office accused her of violating Poland's Act on Upbringing in Sobriety and Counteracting Alcoholism by promoting alcohol on social media through sponsored posts for a vodka company. She pled not guilty and refused to testify.

Margaret released her synth-pop sixth studio album, Siniaki i cekiny, on 26 April 2024. A double concept album, it debuted at number 47 in Poland, and was certified gold by ZPAV. The record earned a Fryderyk nomination for Album of the Year – Pop. Its preceding lead single, "Tańcz głupia", was marketed as the start of Margaret's new pop era. Released in May 2023, the song became her first number one in Poland, and achieved two-times platinum sales in the country. "Dalej biegnę" and "Bynajmniej" served as the follow up singles in July and September 2023, respectively, with the latter reaching number eight in Poland. In January 2024, Margaret released a collaboration with Álvaro Soler titled "Hot Like Summer", followed by the single "Miłego lata" in April, which peaked at number six in the Polish charts. The songs "Mała ja" ("Little Me") and "Margarita" were also released as singles from the album; "Margarita" charted at number 18 in Poland.

After writing songs for Viki Gabor's 2024 third studio album Terminal 3, Margaret returned as a headliner for the second edition of Babie Lato in July 2024, alongside Brodka and Rosalie. To promote the event, they recorded the song "Błyszczę". Margaret performed a solo set at the 2024 Open'er Festival in July. In November 2024, she reissued Siniaki i cekiny as Siniaki i cekiny ciąg dalszy with six new tracks, including the singles "Mamy farta" featuring Polish rapper Pezet and "Tak musiało być", which peaked at number 18 in the Polish charts. Margaret embarked on her fourth headlining concert tour, the Siniaki i cekiny Tour, in March 2025. On 30 June 2025, she released the single "Kicia". She headlined the 2025 Babie Lato for the third consecutive year, this time alongside Zalia and Sara James. They collaborated on an EP as part of the project, and promoted it with the single "Co za noc". In September 2025, Margaret returned as a coach for the 16th season of The Voice of Poland, which was won by a member of her team, Jan Piwowarczyk.

=== 2026: Tripolar ===
Margaret's seventh studio album, Tripolar, was released on 6 November 2026. The record was preceded by two EPs: Body on 5 March 2026 and Voice on 14 August 2026. Songs from both EPs, including the singles "Let You Talk About It", "Jetlag" with Kizo, "Primabalerina" and "Mogłeś tu być", were featured on Tripolar. The album also comprised the singles "List do starych" and "Połamane skrzydła". In June 2026, Margaret collaborated with Polish singer Dawid Kwiatkowski on the single "Później ci opowiem" from his studio album Południe. "Primabalerina" and "Później ci opowiem" concurrently appeared in the top five of the Polish charts, and peaked at numbers two and four, respectively.

== Artistry ==
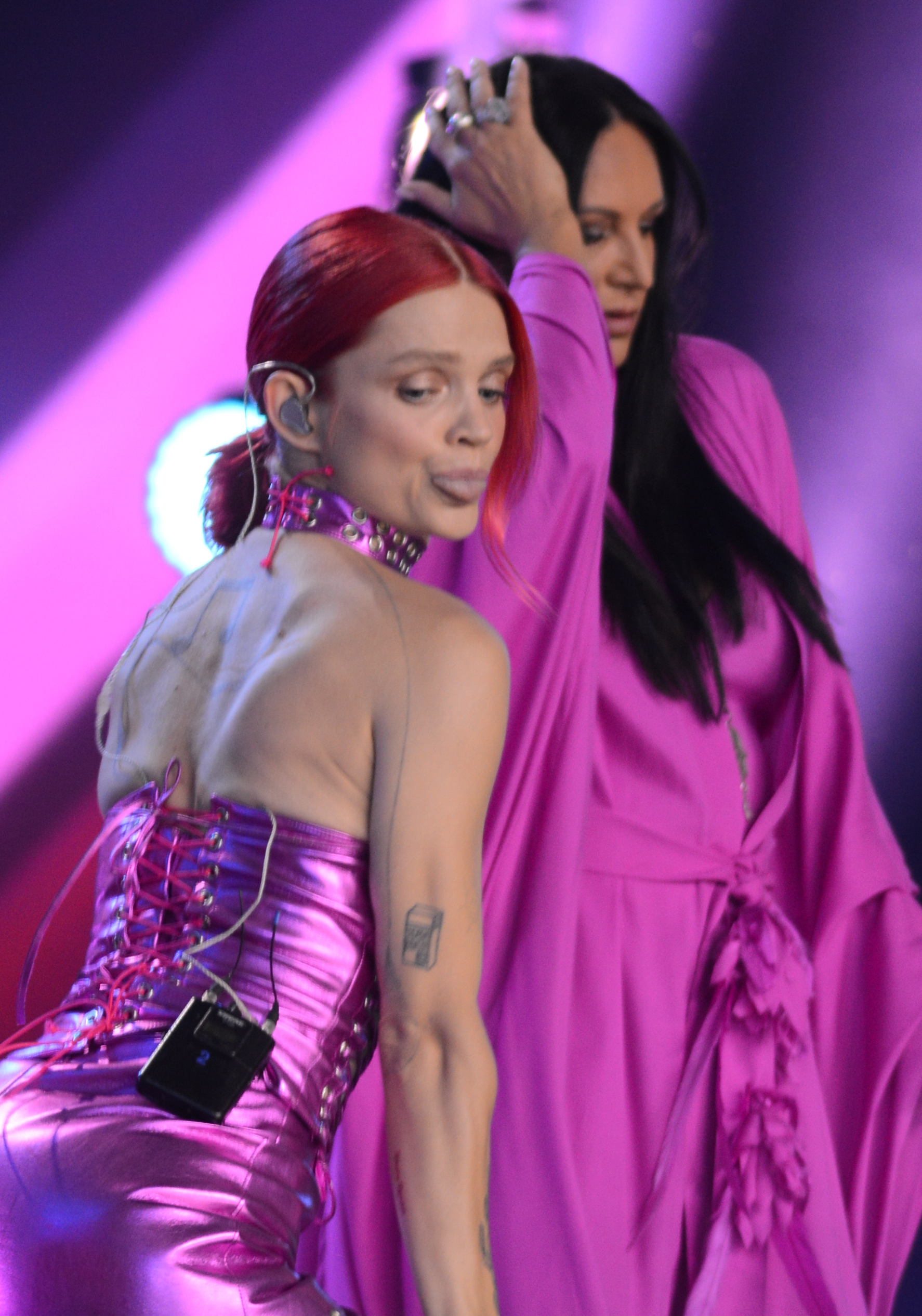
Margaret with Kayah whom she cites as a musical inspiration

Margaret is an alto. On the single "Cool Me Down", her vocal range spans approximately one-and-a-half octaves from G_{4} to C_{6}, and her singing style drew comparisons to Rihanna's, which led to accusations of Margaret copying her. She responded, saying: "In lower registers my timbre is indeed similar to Rihanna's ... I will not apologise for that". Although Margaret's music has been classified as pop, she incorporates other musical styles into her songs. She described her music as "bitter-sweet", explaining that "it looks cute and sweet, but it can get serious, wild and crazy."

Since the beginning of her career, Margaret has been actively involved in the songwriting process for her albums. She co-wrote four tracks on Add the Blonde, most of the tracks on Monkey Business, and beginning with Gaja Hornby, she co-writes all of her music. Early in her career, her songs were primarily in English, which she believed best suited her musical style at the time. On her first Polish-language album, Gaja Hornby, Margaret said she felt ready to open up and sing in her native language, comparing singing in English to wearing a mask. The album's title refers to an alter ego she created early in her career, which combines a name she wished she had been given at birth with the name of her favourite author, Nick Hornby. Having adopted the name to protect her privacy, Margaret decided to reveal it to her fans as a way of sharing a more personal side of her life with them. The album also marked her transition from mainstream pop to a more urban sound, which was influenced by Kacezet. On Maggie Vision, Margaret assumed the rebellious persona Maggie as a means to express her anger with the surrounding reality. With Siniaki i cekiny, she intended to find closure from her past through dancing, combining the emotional weight of the lyrics with upbeat music.

Margaret's musical inspirations include Polish artists Grażyna Łobaszewska and Kayah. She considers the latter's 2006 MTV Unplugged performance "iconic", and has said that as she watched it for the first time, she dreamed of doing one of her own, which ultimately materialised. Margaret was also inspired by Kayah—founder of the record company Kayax—to follow in her footsteps and open her own label, Gaja Hornby Records. Citing Rihanna as another of her musical inspirations, Margaret stated that she admires her for not being perfect, both musically and in life. She credits Polish rapper Łona as a primary influence on her writing style.

=== Critical reception ===
Reviewing Add the Blonde, Codzienna Gazeta Muzyczna ("Daily Music Newspaper") described Margaret's voice as distinctive, while Onet noted her versatility, writing that she can sing "seductively, and innocently, and romantically". Onet also praised Margaret for writing her own songs, but Codzienna Gazeta Muzyczna called her lyrics "rather simple and undemanding, emotionally on par with the average listener of the album". In his review of Just the Two of Us, jazz critic Daniel Wyszogrodzki of Jazz Forum wrote that Margaret has potential as a smooth jazz singer due to the "exceptional purity of her voice" and its "interesting timbre". Polish music critic Robert Kozyra took a more negative view of her talent, describing her voice as "small" and arguing that her "weak" live performances reveal her limited vocal capabilities. Interia and Onet, in their reviews of Monkey Business, criticised Margaret's attempt at singing Polish ballads, saying her "girly" voice is best suited for uptempo songs.

Margaret's foray into hip-hop was praised by several Polish rappers including Kacper HTA, KęKę and Szpaku. When asked in 2020 who he considered the best Polish female rapper, Kacper HTA stated that in his opinion Margaret delivered the best rap verse among women in Poland on Young Igi's single "Układanki" despite not being a professional rapper.

== Public image ==
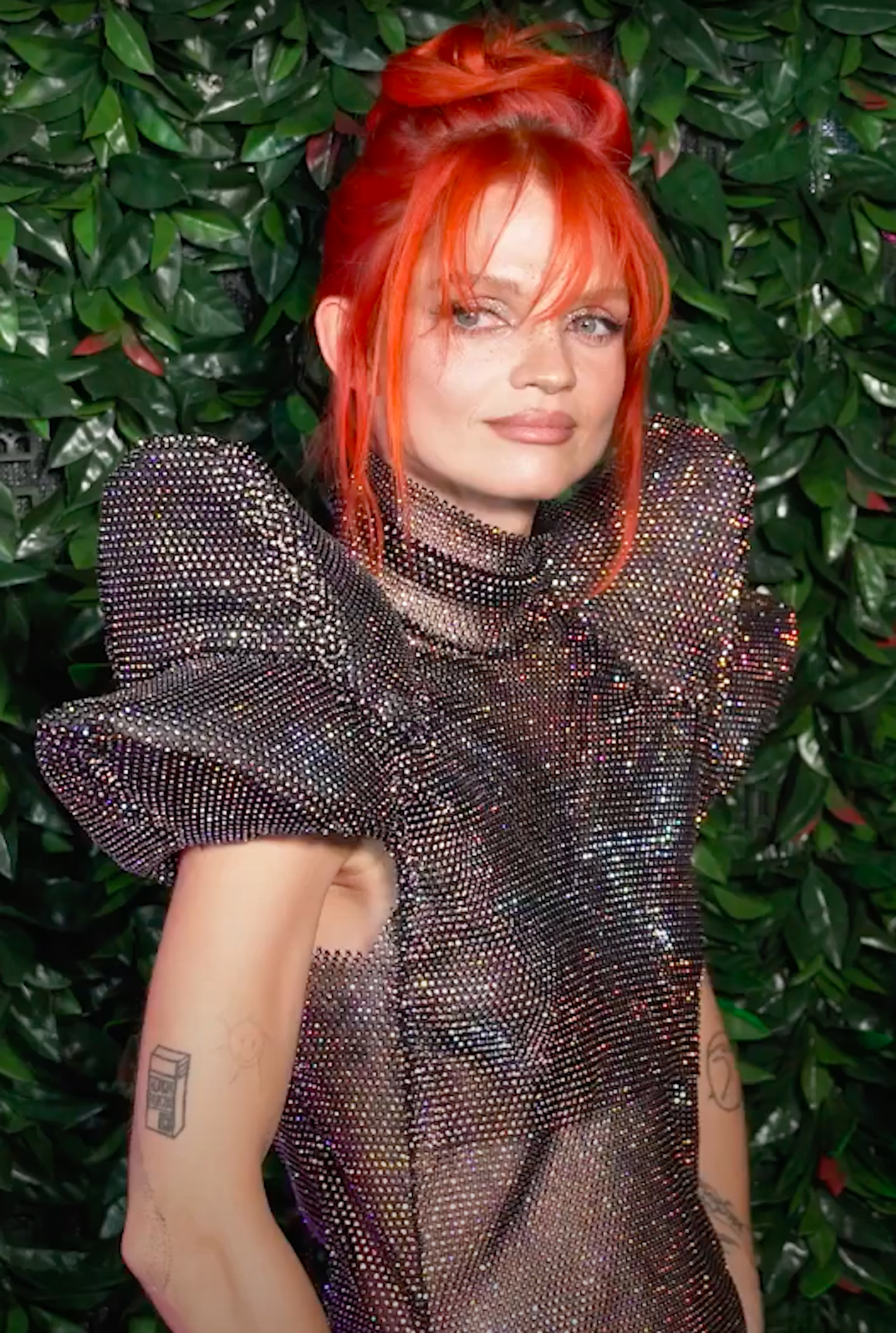
Margaret at the 2022 Party Fashion Night

Margaret's fashion style and music have been widely covered by Polish media. Known for experimenting with fashion, she has cited Miroslava Duma, Kate Moss, and early in her career Gwen Stefani as her fashion inspirations. She described herself as a fashion victim but said that experimenting with fashion allowed her to find her own style. Marcin Brzeziński of Viva! magazine expressed his admiration for Margaret's approach to fashion, noting her lack of limits, while Dorota Wróblewska, a Polish stylist and fashion show producer, pointed out that Margaret is not afraid of criticism and likes to surprise audiences with her fashion choices. Polish Glamour magazine recognised her as Glamour Woman of the Year in 2014 and Fashion Icon in 2015. In 2020, she ranked 10th on the Polish magazine Wprost's ("Directly") list of the Best Dressed Polish Women.

Margaret was the eighth-most-googled Polish celebrity of 2013 and ranked fourth in the Polish music category of Google's 2013 Zeitgeist report. In 2014, she was included on Forbes Poland's list of the 100 most valuable stars of Polish show business. Her market value was estimated at 235,000 zł (€57,000 as of July 2014), ranking her 67th on the list. In 2015, Wprost ranked her 38th on its list of the 50 most-influential Polish celebrities. She was also the second most-followed Polish musician on Instagram that year with 138,000 followers. Margaret ranked fifth on Forbes Women Poland's 2022 list of the 100 most valuable female personal brands with an advertising value equivalency (AVE) of 155 million zł. She maintained her fifth-place position in the 2023 issue of the ranking with an AVE of 229 million zł. In subsequent years, she ranked sixth on the list with an AVE of 269 million zł (2024), nineteenth with an AVE of 161 million zł (2025), and twenty-sixth with an AVE of 115 million zł (2026).

== Personal life and activism ==
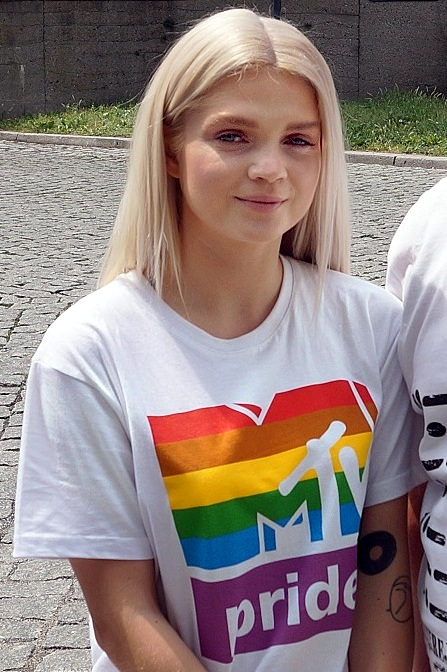
Margaret wearing the MTV Pride T-shirt in 2018

Margaret met Polish musician Piotr "Kacezet" Kozieradzki in 2017 and confirmed their relationship a year later. In May 2019, she announced their engagement. They informally married the following January in Peru in a spiritual wedding ceremony performed by shamans. The marriage is not recognised in law. She is a stepmother to his daughter from a previous relationship.

Margaret openly talks about her struggles with mental health. She has been attending therapy since the beginning of her career to cope with the pressures of fame and believes that looking after one's mental health should be normalised, comparing it to going to the gym. In 2022, she revealed that she had been raped at age 10, and as a result had attempted suicide shortly before the release of her debut single. She said that years of suppressed emotions from the trauma pushed her to her breaking point in 2019, leading to her temporary career break. The admission earned her the 2024 Wprost ShEO Award for Engaged Culture.

Margaret endorses environmentalism and named her alter ego after the Greek Mother Earth Gaia. She actively supports the LGBT community, and Anja Rubik's "SexEd" campaign, which promotes sex education. In a 2019 interview with Playboy Poland magazine, she criticised the Catholic church for its sexual ethics and said that she wants to commit apostasy, which she did in 2024. She later explained that she does not believe in God and said it only feels right to leave the group she no longer feels part of. In a 2021 interview, Margaret further clarified that she does not believe in the Christian God, but she does not consider herself an atheist. She said that she is a spiritual person and believes in energy.

In response to President of Poland Andrzej Duda's comment characterising LGBT as an "ideology" and to celebrate Pride Month, Margaret launched an annual series called "Tęczowa Szkoła Maggie" ("Maggie's Rainbow School") in June 2020. The series saw Margaret hand over her Instagram account to members of the LGBT community, who shared their daily lives with her followers in an effort to combat social stigma against LGBT people. The series branched out onto TikTok in 2022, and concluded as a podcast in 2024. Margaret supports the idea of sisterhood rather than feminism, and in 2021, she became an ambassador of the "#NieCzekam107Lat" ("I'm Not Waiting 107 Years") campaign, which highlights the issue of the gender gap in Poland, expected to close in 107 years. Margaret released the charity song "Mimo burz" in March 2022 to benefit Ukraine during the Russian invasion. She also offered to accommodate in her apartment Ukrainian refugees and was among the artists who collectively raised and donated 936,000 zł to the Polish Center for International Aid, which supports those affected by the war. Due to the negative effects of plastic on the environment, she decided not to release her 2024 album Siniaki i cekiny on a compact disc.

== Achievements ==
Margaret has won various accolades during her career, including five Eska Music Awards, two Glamour Poland Awards, a Kids' Choice Award, four MTV Europe Music Awards, and a Róże Gali award. Her third MTV Europe Music Award win in 2018 made her the first Polish artist to win the award more than twice, a record she extended in 2020 with her fourth win. At the National Festival of Polish Song, she received a SuperJedynka award in 2014 and the TVP1 Special Award in 2017. She has also been honoured with Wprost's ShEO Award for her activism in 2024. Margaret was the third most-streamed Polish female artist of the decade on Spotify in a ranking published by Spotify Poland to mark its tenth anniversary in 2023. She was the 30th most-played artist on Polish radio in 2025.

== Discography ==
- Add the Blonde (2014)
- Just the Two of Us (2015)
- Monkey Business (2017)
- Gaja Hornby (2019)
- Maggie Vision (2021)
- Siniaki i cekiny (2024)
- Tripolar (2026)

== Filmography ==
Film
Year	Title	Role	Notes	Ref.
2017	Smurfs: The Lost Village	Smurfstorm	Voice role in Polish-language version	
2019	Całe szczęście	Gaja Hornby	Cameo	
2022	Zadra	Justi		
2023	Whale Nation	Narrator	Documentary; voice role in Polish-language version	

Television
Year	Title	Role	Notes	Ref.
2006, 2009	A Chance for Success	Herself	Contestant	
2015	Retromania	Herself	Host	
2018, 2019	Melodifestivalen	Herself	Contestant	
2019, 2025	The Voice of Poland	Herself	Seasons 10 and 16 coach	
2025	You Can Dance – Po prostu tańcz!	Herself	Season 10 guest judge	
2025	Rhythm + Flow: Poland	Herself	Season 1 guest judge	

Radio
Year	Title	Role	Notes	Ref.
2022	Niech to usłyszą	Maggie	Radio series; main role	
