= Barbara Hetmańska =

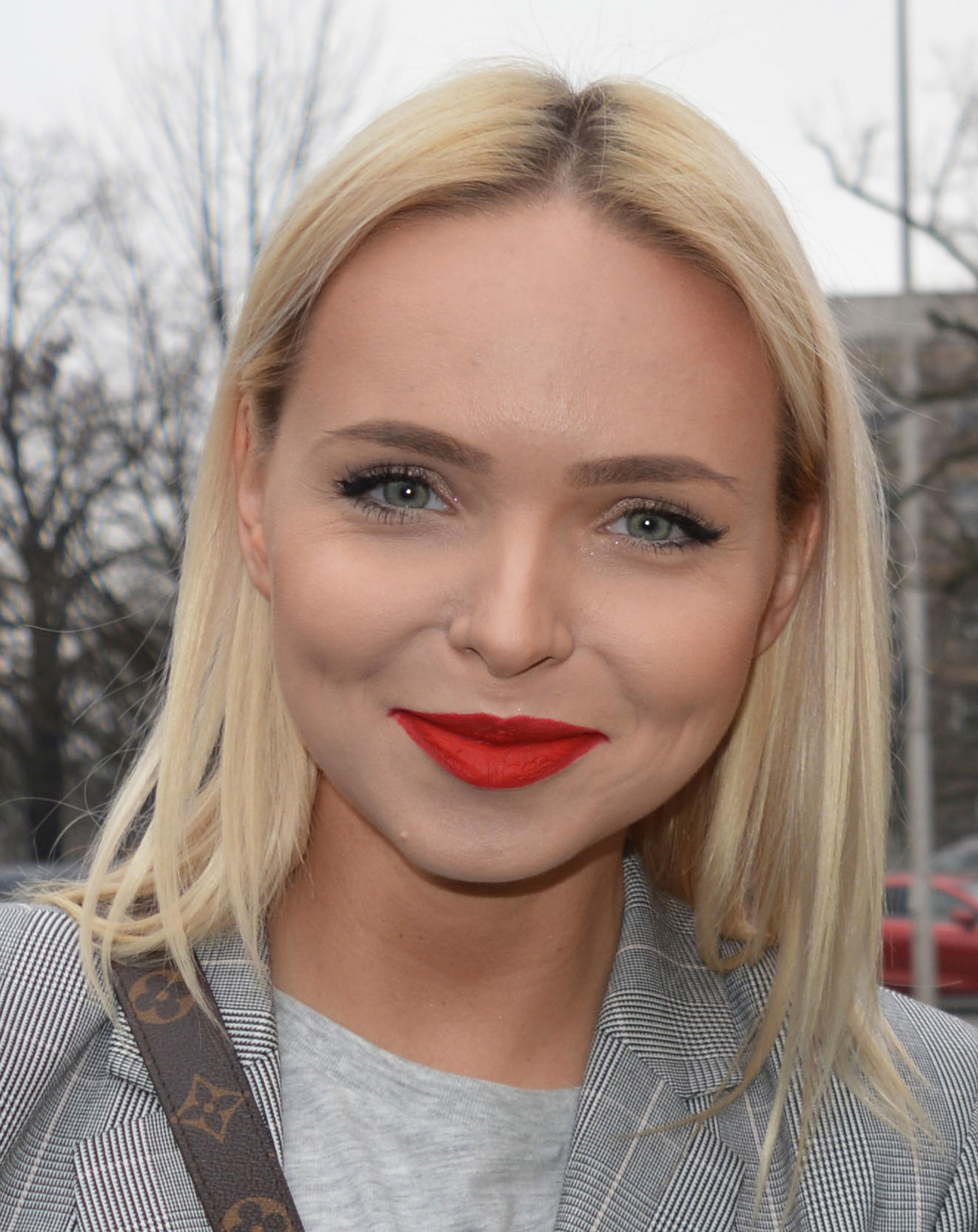
- Barbara Hetmańska in 2017

Background information
- Also known as: Candy Girl
- Born: 29 November 1986 (age 39)
- Genres: club-pop
- Occupation: vocalist
- Label: Magic Records
- Website: candygirl.pl

Barbara Hetmańska (born 29 November 1986 in Katowice, Poland), known as Candy Girl, is a Polish dance pop singer. She has collaborated with such Polish musicians as Alchemist Project, East Clubbers, Wet Fingers, and with the British duo Riff & Rays.

Hetmańska has signed in 2006 to Magic Records. In May 2009, she released her debut single, titled "Wszystko, czego dziś chcę", which is cover of Izabela Trojanowska's song. On 12 June 2009, she performed her new single "Yeah!" at the Opole Music Festival. Her third single, "Czas (siłę w sobie mam)", was released in December 2009, and her 23 November 2009 debut album was titled Hałas w mojej głowie and includes 15 dance music tracks.

In early 2010, she released her new single titled "Lick It", a collaboration with DJ Adamus. Along with the single's music video, on her YouTube official site she published the videos for the English versions of her 2009 singles "Yeah!" and "Czas (siłę w sobie mam)", this last one under the new title "Take My Breath Away".

In 2011, she released her second studio album Między jawą a snem, which in August 2012 will be released in Asia under the English title Between Sleep And Wakefulness.
