= Radio Kolor =

Radio station in Warsaw, Poland

Radio Kolor 103 FM
- Warsaw; Poland
- Broadcast area: Warsaw, Radom, Płock
- Frequency: 103 FM

Ownership
- Owner: MFM Sp. z.o.o. and Impact Media Sp. z.o.o.

History
- Founded: 1992

Radio Kolor 103 FM – radio station from Warsaw, which is broadcast at 103 FM frequency.

It was founded in 1992 by Krzysztof Materna and Wojciech Mann. It was playing music of the 1980s, 1990s and 2000s. In 2007 the station changed its format and now it is the only station which broadcasts black music. Usually, all of the programs on this station is directed to women.
