= Heartbeat (Margaret song) =

Single by Margaret

from the album Add the Blonde
- B-side: "Cool Me Down"
- Released: 23 February 2015
- Genre: Pop
- Length: 3:17
- Label: Magic
- Songwriter(s): Margaret; Joakim Buddee

Margaret singles chronology
"O mnie się nie martw" (2014)	"Heartbeat" (2015)	"Smak radości" (2015)

Music video
- "Heartbeat" on YouTube

"Heartbeat" is a song by Polish singer Margaret. It was included on her debut studio album Add the Blonde (2014), and released to Polish contemporary hit radio as its third single on 23 February 2015. The "Special Limited Box" edition of Add the Blonde released on 23 December 2016 included a 7-inch vinyl of the single "Cool Me Down" with "Heartbeat" as the A-side. "Heartbeat" was written by Margaret and Joakim Buddee. Some of its lyrics were influenced by Michael Jackson's song "Beat It". The single reached number 11 on the Polish Airplay Chart.

Live recording of "Heartbeat" from Margaret's MTV Unplugged concert special was released on its accompanying live album in 2023.

== Music video ==
The song's music video was directed by Olga Czyżykiewicz. It was released on 12 June 2015.

== Accolades ==
Year	Ceremony	Category	Result	Ref.
2016	Polsat SuperHit Festival	Fakt Readers' Award	Won	

== Charts ==
=== Weekly charts ===
Chart (2015)	Peak position
Poland (Polish Airplay Top 100)	11

== Release history ==
Region	Date	Format	Label	Ref.
Poland	23 February 2015	Contemporary hit radio	Magic Records	
