= Gaja Hornby =

Studio album by Margaret
- Released: 17 May 2019
- Recorded: 2018–2019
- Genre: Urban pop
- Length: 23:42
- Label: Artistars; Powerhouse

Margaret chronology
Monkey Business (2017)	Gaja Hornby (2019)	Maggie Vision (2021)

Singles from Gaja Hornby
- 1. "Gaja Hornby" Released: 22 April 2019; 2. "Serce Baila" Released: 3 June 2019; 3. "Chwile bez słów" Released: 10 July 2019; 4. "Ej chłopaku" Released: 6 September 2019

Gaja Hornby is the fourth studio album and first Polish-language album by Polish singer Margaret. It was released digitally on 17 May 2019 and physically on 31 May 2019 by Artistars under exclusive license from Powerhouse, only in Poland. The album was named after Margaret's alter ego.

Gaja Hornby charted at number 13 in Poland. Its title track was released as the first single in April 2019, and was followed by "Serce Baila", "Chwile bez słów" (featuring Kacezet), and "Ej chłopaku". Margaret embarked on a concert tour in October 2019 to promote the record.

== Background and development ==
In 2018, Margaret revealed that she was working on her first Polish-language album. In March 2019, in an interview with Uroda Życia, she announced the album's title as Gaja Hornby, and April 2019 as its release date; the release was later pushed back to 17 May. Prior to the album's release Margaret described it as her most honest record to date. The album was named after her alter ego, which she created at the beginning of her career to protect her privacy. It is a combination of a name she wished she was given at birth and the name of her favourite author Nick Hornby. Margaret explained that the reason she decided to use it as a name for the album was because the record is "much more personal" than any of her previous releases. She added that she was now ready to share the more personal side of her life with her fans as she is now older and has a "thicker skin".

Margaret announced that the album would be reissued at the beginning of 2020, after initially announcing an extended play as its sequel. Eventually, both projects were shelved.

== Music and lyrics ==
Gaja Hornby incorporates a more urban sound to that of Margaret's previous bubblegum pop releases, and explores themes such as environmentalism, online hate speech and the dark side of fame.

== Promotion ==
=== Singles ===
The album's title track was released as its lead single on 22 April 2019. The second and third singles, "Serce Baila" and "Chwile bez słów" featuring Kacezet, were released on 3 June 2019 and 10 July 2019 respectively. The fourth single, "Ej chłopaku", was released on 6 September 2019. Margaret also released a lyric video for the album track "Błyski fleszy, plotki, ścianki" in October 2019.

=== Tour ===
Margaret embarked on a Gaja Hornby Tour, her first headlining concert tour, to promote the album. It visited five clubs in Poland between 2 and 25 October 2019; the sixth and final show scheduled for 30 October was cancelled two days prior for undisclosed reasons. During the tour, Margaret performed songs from Gaja Hornby, some of her biggest hits, and three new songs.

== Critical reception ==
Professional ratings
Review scores
Source	Rating
Gazeta Wyborcza	3.5/5 stars
Interia	5/10 stars

In his review of the album, Jarek Szubrycht of Gazeta Wyborcza praised Margaret's artistic growth and the work of the Polish producers she enlisted for the record, noting they played a key role in shaping its sound.

== Accolades ==
Accolades for Gaja Hornby
Year	Organization	Award	Result	Ref.
2019	Róże Gali Awards	Music	Nominated	
2020	Fryderyk	Album of the Year – Pop	Nominated	

== Track listing ==
Gaja Hornby track listing
No.	Title	Writer(s)	Length
1.	"Gaja Hornby"	Małgorzata Jamroży; Piotr Kozieradzki; Mariusz Obijalski; Mikołaj Trybulec	2:40
2.	"Ten dzień"	Jamroży; Kozieradzki; Jan Szarecki	2:34
3.	"Serce Baila"	Jamroży; Kozieradzki; Szarecki	2:31
4.	"Błyski fleszy, plotki, ścianki"	Jamroży; Kozieradzki; Trybulec; Marek Walaszek	2:33
5.	"Ej chłopaku"	Jamroży; Kozieradzki; Mateusz Kochaniec; Dominic Buczkowski	2:37
6.	"VAJB" (featuring Gverilla)	Jamroży; Buczkowski; Szarecki; Kochaniec	3:00
7.	"Psia mać"	Jamroży; Kozieradzki; Szarecki	2:28
8.	"Chwile bez słów" (featuring Kacezet)	Jamroży; Kozieradzki; Szarecki; Trybulec; Kochaniec	2:40
9.	"Światło"	Jamroży; Kozieradzki; Trybulec; Kochaniec	2:39
Total length:			23:42

== Charts ==
Chart performance for Gaja Hornby
Chart (2019)	Peak position
Polish Albums (ZPAV)	13

== Release history ==
Release history and formats for Gaja Hornby
Region	Date	Format	Label	Ref.
Poland	17 May 2019	Digital download; streaming	Artistars	
Poland	31 May 2019	CD	Artistars	
