= Eska Music Awards =

Polish music awards ceremony

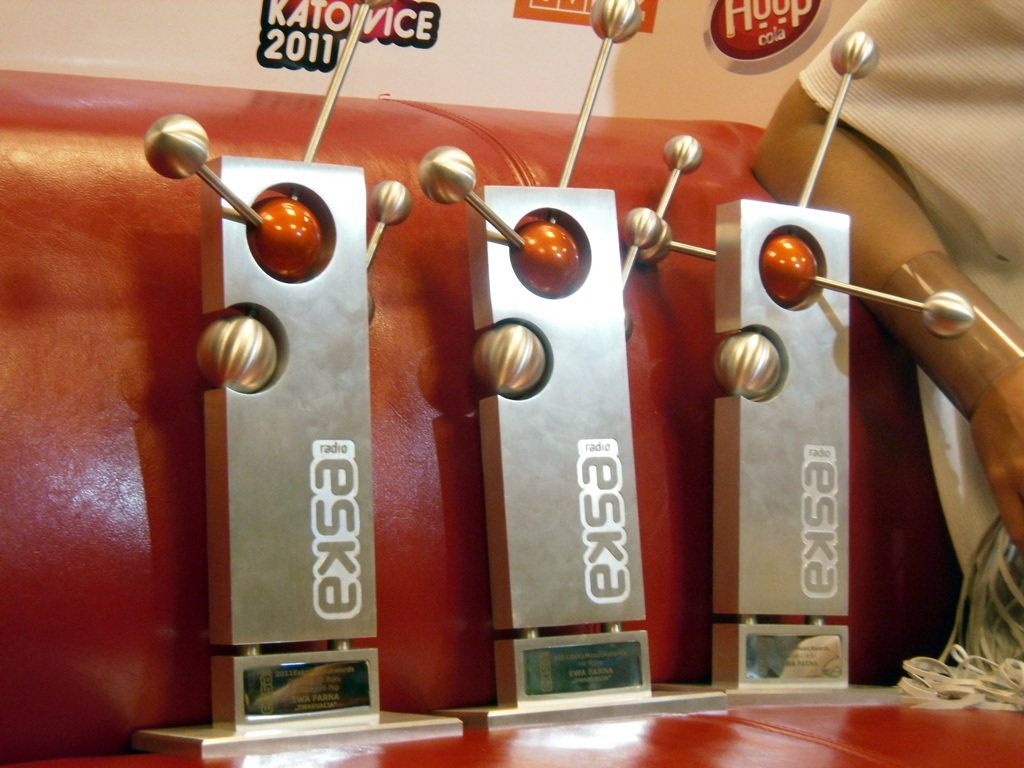
- Country: Poland
- Presented by: Radio Eska
- First award: 25 February 2002; 24 years ago
- Final award: 17 June 2017; 9 years ago

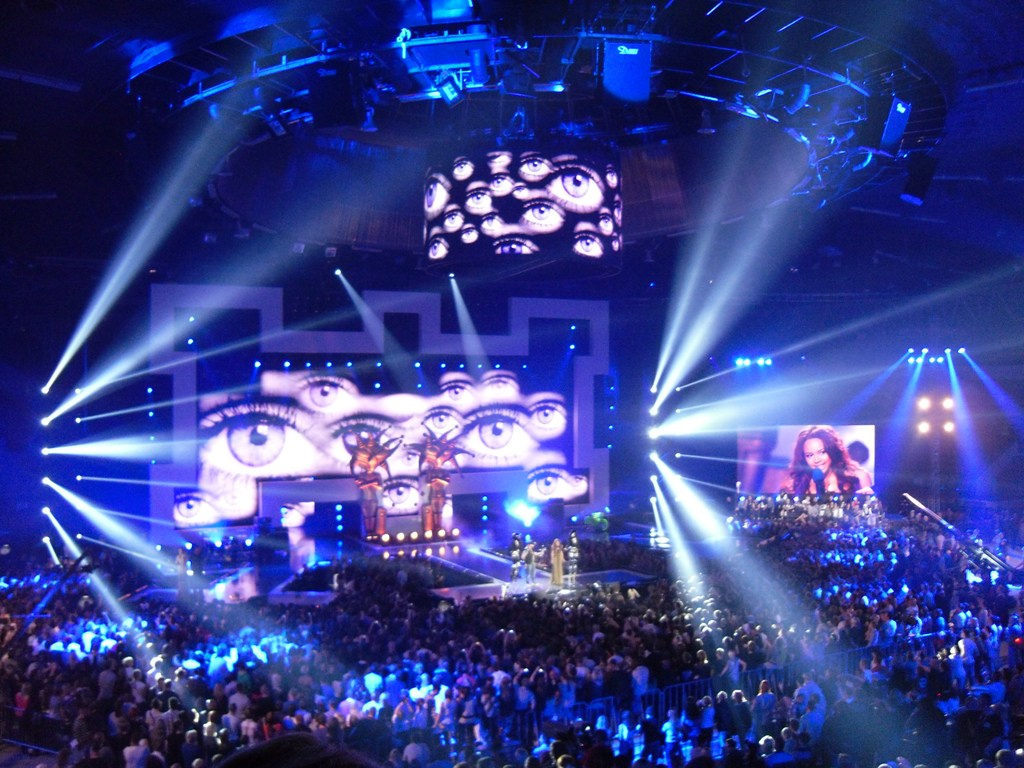
Eska Music Awards 2011

Eska Music Awards (EMA) is a Polish awards ceremony for national and international music, launched in 2002 by Radio Eska. The awards were last presented in 2017.

Amongst the award winners are Jamelia, Alexis Jordan, t.A.T.u., 3 Doors Down, The Rasmus, Mattafix, Melanie C, Sugababes, Razorlight, September, Sarsa, Craig David, Margaret, The Killers, Matt Pokora, Katy Perry, Lady Gaga, Sunrise Avenue, OneRepublic, White Lies, Kesha, Basshunter, Inna, David Guetta, Nelly Furtado, Adam Lambert, Ed Sheeran and more.

== 2016 Eska Music Awards ==
Eska Music Awards 2016
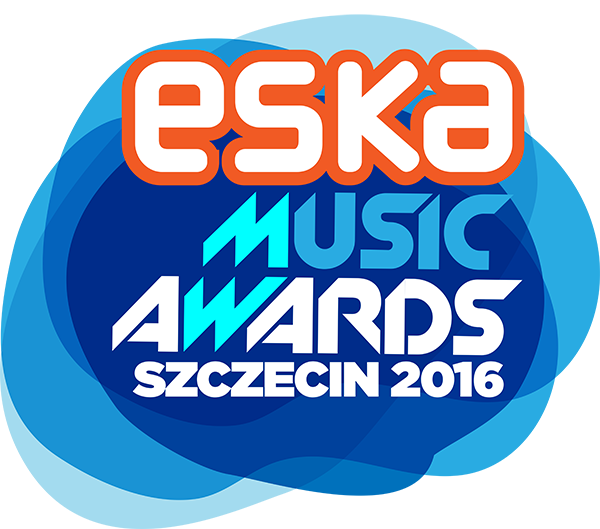
- Date: 26 August 2016
- Location: Azoty Arena, Szczecin
- Hosted by: Krzysztof Jankes Jankowski; Paulina Chylewska

Highlights
- Most awards: Sylwia Grzeszczak (2)

Television/radio coverage
- Network: TVP1; Radio Eska; Eska TV

The 2016 Eska Music Awards were held on 26 August 2016 and was the 15th edition of the Radio Eska's annual music awards. The awards ceremony was held at Azoty Arena in Szczecin. Award nominations were revealed on 4 July 2016.

=== Performances ===
| Artist | Song |
|---|---|
| Sound'n'Grace & Arek Kłusowski | "Can't Stop the Feeling!" |
| Filatov & Karas | "Tell It to My Heart" |
| C-BooL & Giang Pham | "Never Go Away" |
| Antek Smykiewicz | "Pomimo burz" |
| Sylwia Grzeszczak | "Tamta dziewczyna" |
| Margaret | "Cool Me Down" "Elephant" "Lush Life" |
| Video | "Ktoś nowy" |
| Jasmine Thompson | "Ain't Nobody" "Rise Up" "Sun Goes Down" |
| Monika Lewczuk | "Ty i Ja" |
| Sound'n'Grace | "Sens" |
| Szymon Chodyniecki | "Z całych sił" |
| Ewelina Lisowska | "Prosta sprawa" |
| Grzegorz Hyży | "Pod wiatr" |
| LP | "Lost on You" |
| Alan Walker | "Faded" "Sing Me to Sleep" |

=== Nominees and winners ===
The nominations were revealed on 4 July 2016.

| Best Hit | Best Male Artist |
|---|---|
| C-BooL - "Never Go Away"; Antek Smykiewicz - "Pomimo burz"; Dawid Podsiadło - "W dobrą stronę"; Margaret - "Cool Me Down"; Sylwia Grzeszczak - "Tamta dziewczyna" | Dawid Podsiadło; Antek Smykiewicz; Kamil Bednarek |
| Best Female Artist | Best Group |
| Sylwia Grzeszczak; Cleo; Margaret | Video; Enej; Sound'n'Grace |
| EskaGO Award - Best Artist in Network | EskaTV Award - Best Video |
| Margaret; Cleo; Michał Szpak | Sylwia Grzeszczak - "Tamta dziewczyna"; Ania Dąbrowska - "W głowie"; Cleo - "Zabiorę nas" |
| Best New Artist | Special Award - Best International Hit |
| Antek Smykiewicz; Monika Lewczuk; Szymon Chodyniecki | Alan Walker – "Faded" |

== 2017 Eska Music Awards ==
Eska Music Awards 2017
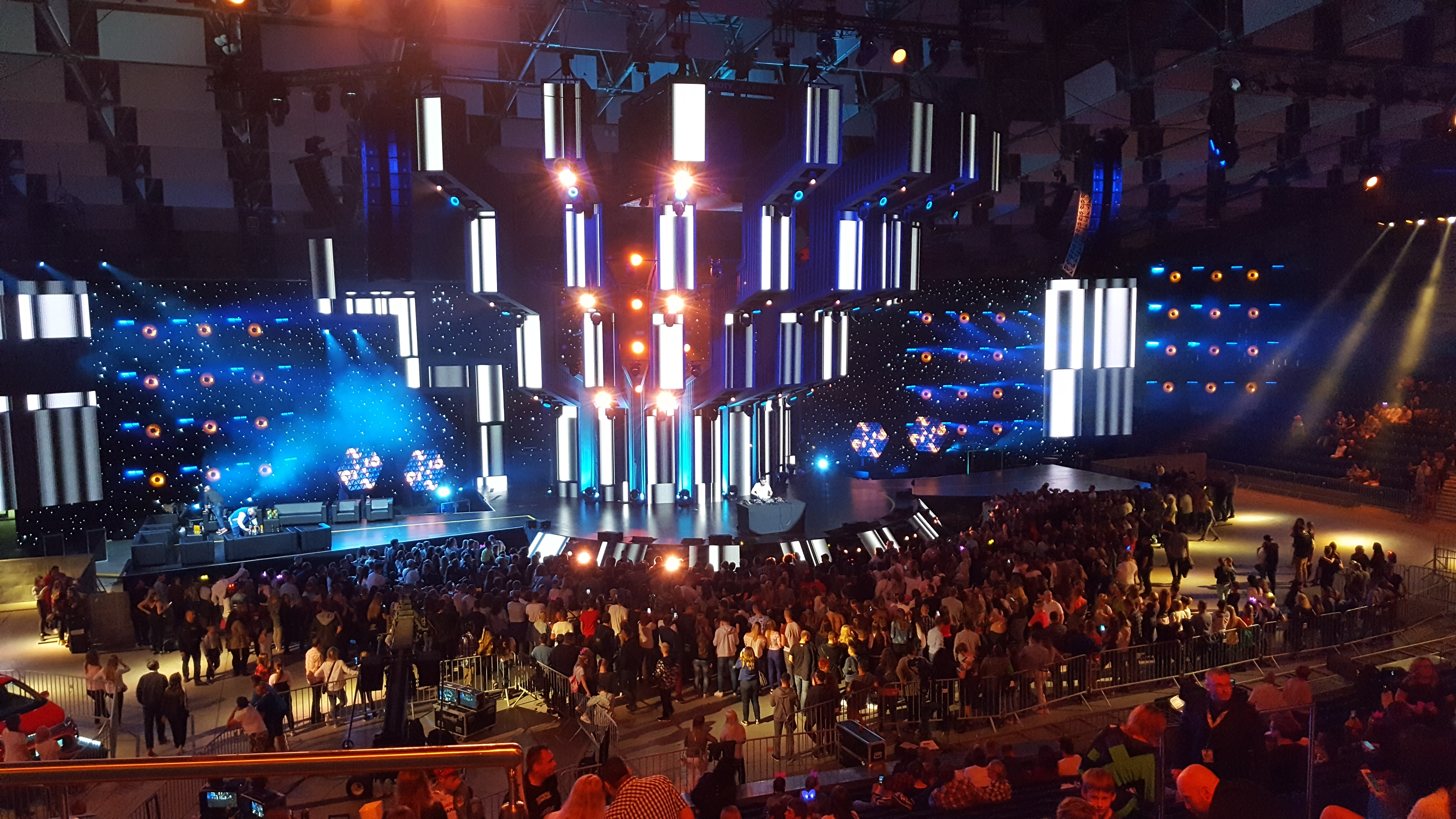
- Date: 17 June 2017
- Location: Azoty Arena, Szczecin
- Hosted by: Krzysztof Jankes Jankowski; Paulina Chylewska

Highlights
- Most awards: Agnieszka Chylińska (2)

Television/radio coverage
- Network: TVP1; Radio Eska; Eska TV

The 2017 Eska Music Awards were held on 17 June 2017 and was the 16th edition of the Radio Eska's annual music awards. The awards ceremony was held at Azoty Arena in Szczecin. Award nominations were revealed on 20 April 2017.

=== Performances ===
| Artist | Song |
|---|---|
| Gromee & Orkiestra Szczecińska | "Shape of You" |
| Sigala & Bryn Christopher | "Sweet Lovin'" |
| Margaret | "I Don't Wanna Live Forever" "What You Do" |
| Ania Dąbrowska | "Porady na zdrady (Dreszcze)" |
| Mandee & Maria Mathea | "Superstar" |
| Ofenbach | "Be Mine" |
| Patryk Kumór | "Human" "Not In My Head" |
| Alma | "Bonfire" "Chasing Highs" |
| Matthew Koma | "Kisses Back" |
| Monika Lewczuk | "Ty i Ja" "Libre" |
| Starley | "Call on Me" |
| Sarsa | "Bronię się" |
| C-Bool & K-Leah | "DJ Is Your Second Name" "Magic Symphony" |
| Sigala & Ella Eyre | "Came Here for Love" |
| Gromee & Mahan Moin | "Spirit" |
| Mateusz Ziółko | "W płomieniach" |
| Sound'n'Grace | "Cake by the Ocean" |

=== Nominees and winners ===
The nominations were revealed on 20 April 2017.

| Best Hit | Best Male Artist |
|---|---|
| C-BooL - "Magic Symphony"; Agnieszka Chylińska - "Królowa łez"; Monika Lewczuk - "Ty i Ja"; Kamil Bednarek & Matheo - "Talizman"; Mateusz Ziółko - "W płomieniach" | Kamil Bednarek; Grzegorz Hyży; Mateusz Ziółko |
| Best Female Artist | Best DJ/Producer |
| Agnieszka Chylińska; Sarsa; Monika Lewczuk | Gromee; C-BooL; Mandee |
| EskaGO Award - Best Artist in Network | EskaTV Award - Best Video |
| Margaret; Ewa Farna; Kamil Bednarek | Agnieszka Chylińska - "Królowa łez"; Mrozu - "Nieśmiertelni"; Kamil Bednarek & Matheo - "Talizman" |
Special Award - Best International Artist
Ed Sheeran
