= Extensive Music =

Swedish record label

- Founded: 1993
- Genre: Electronic dance music
- Country of origin: Sweden
- Location: Stockholm
- Official website: extensivemusic.com

Extensive Music, previously Global Artist Management is a Swedish record label founded in 1993. Its base is in Stockholm. Extensive Music has sublabels: Extensive Music Sweden, Extensive Music UK and Extensive Music JLT.

In 2014 during Midem week in Cannes Extensive Music expanded cooperation agreement for Scandinavia with Warner Music Group.

== Artists ==
=== Current ===
Name
Basshunter
Arash
Margaret

=== Former ===
Name
Ali Payami
Aneela
Beldina
Bodies Without Organs
Damian Drăghici
DJ Aligator
Frida Appelgren
Günther
Jon Lord
Leo Today
Liquido
Nation X
Puppet Generation
The Sunshinegirls
Velvet

== See also ==
- Lists of record labels
