= Magic Records =

- Founded: 1994
- Founder: Jan Kubicki
- Genre: dance, techno, electronic music, pop music
- Country of origin: Poland
- Location: Warsaw
- Official website: www.magicrecords.pl

Magic Records Sp. z o.o., is a Polish record label founded in 1994 in Warsaw. From 1998 until 2022, the label was a subsidiary of Universal Music Poland. The company's founder and CEO is Jan Kubicki.

In the 1990s the label specialized in dance, techno and electronic music, releasing albums by such artists as DJ'e TT, DR Marek, Exdance, I&I, MC Diva and Top One among others. In later years Magic Records expanded and has been releasing pop artists such as Ewa Farna, Margaret and Honorata Skarbek among others. On various licences label released in Poland albums by such artists as Gordon Haskell, Andrea Corr, Vanilla Ninja, Volbeat, Alexander Rybak, Zaz, DJ BoBo and Basia among others.

== Artists ==
=== Current ===
- Marcin Kindla
- Sanah
- Paula Biskup
- bryska
- Kins Ferna's
- Pączki w Tłuszczu
- Wiktoria Zwolińska
- TYNSKY
- Stan Zapalny
- Amelia Andryszczyk

=== Former ===
- Anna Turska
- Blog 27
- Candy Girl
- DJ'e TT
- DR Marek
- Exdance
- I&I
- Jacek Perkowski
- Jarzębina
- Joanna Dark
- Kaja Paschalska
- Kindla
- Małgorzata Kosik
- Mandaryna
- MC Diva
- Piotr Rubik
- Pewex
- Robert M
- Szymon Wydra & Carpe Diem
- Top One
- Urszula Kasprzak
- Queens
- Ewa Farna
- Honorata Skarbek
- Janusz Radek
- Margaret
