= List of awards and nominations received by Doda =

List of Doda's awards
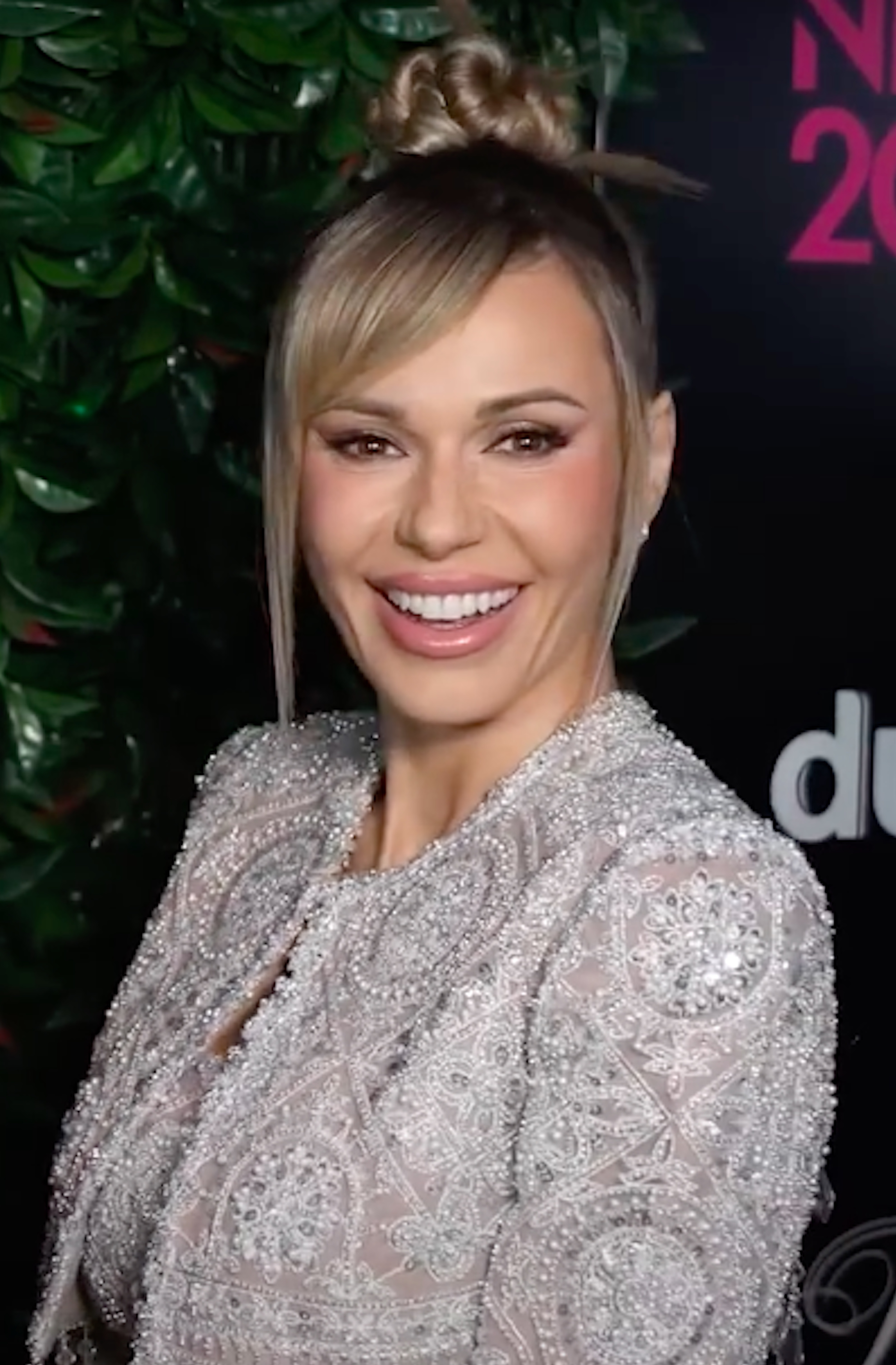
Award	Wins	Nominations
Fryderyki	0	2
Bravoora	2	8
Sopot International Song Festival	1	1
Micros POPCORN	4	6
Świry	7	9
Eska Music Awards	2	5
VIVA Comet	12	13
Złote Dzioby	4	6
VIVA! Fine	0	2
Telekamery Tele Tygodnia	1	5
National Festival of Polish Song in Opole	3	4
MTV Europe Music Awards	3	5
Sopot Hit Festival	1	1
MTV Video Music Awards	0	0
Awards won	74
Nominations	120

This is a comprehensive list of awards and nominations won by Doda, a Polish singer.

Year	Ceremony	Category	Result
2002	Fryderyki	Debut of year	Nominated
2006	"Jetix Kids Awards"	favorite public figure	Won
2006	"eska music awards"	artist of the year	Won
2007	VIVA! Fine 2006	General	Nominated
2007	"Diamentowe stringi"	most shapely bottom	Won
2007	Telekamery Tele Tygodnia 2007	Music	2nd place
2007	Bravoora 2006	Artist of year	Won
2007	Bravoora 2006	Pop group of year	3rd place
2007	Micros POPCORN 2006	Poland - Band of year	Won
2007	Micros POPCORN 2006	Poland - Hit of year	Won
2007	Micros POPCORN 2006	Polish - Artist of year	3rd place
2007	Świry 2007	Świr music	Won
2007	Świry 2007	Most popular HIT	Nominated
2007	Świry 2007	Super Świr	Nominated
2007	Złote Dzioby 2007	Mediumistic personality	Won
2007	Złote Dzioby 2007	Artist of year	Nominated
2007	Złote Dzioby 2007	Video clip of year - Katharsis	Won
2007	VIVA! Fine 2007	Generally	Nominated
2008	"eska music awards"	artist of the year	Nominated
2008	"eska music awards"	music video of the year "Katharsis"	Nominated
2008	"złote dzioby"	vocalist of the year	Won
2008	"złote dzioby"	music video of the year "nie daj się"	Won
2008	"złote dzioby"	hit of the year "nie daj się"	Nominated
2008	Telekamery Tele Tygodnia 2008	Music	2nd place
2008	Video clip of year 2007 - Onet.pl	Video clip of the year - Katharsis	2nd place
2008	Świry 2008	Świr music	Won
2008	Świry 2008	Super świr	Won
2008	Superjedynki 2008	Artist of year	Won
2008	Superjedynki 2008	Album of year	Nominated
2008	Sopot Hit Festival	Polish Hit Summer 2008	Won
2008	"viva fine"	most beautiful Polish women	Nominated
2008	Plebiscyt interia.pl	music video of the year "katharsis"	Won
2008	"toptrendy 2008"	best-selling album 2007 "Diamond bitch"	6th place
2008	"KFPP w Opolu"	Award photographers and journalists	Won
2009	Telekamery Tele Tygodnia 2009	Music	3rd place
2009	Telekamery Tele Tygodnia 2009	People In Shows (jury of Gwiazdy tańczą na lodzie)	4th place
2009	Bravoora 2008	Singer	3rd place
2009	Bravoora 2008	Polish Star of year	2nd place
2009	"micros popcorn"	vocalist of the year	Won
2009	"micros popcorn"	hit of the year "nie daj się"	3rd place
2009	"OGAE video contest 2009"	contest video	3rd place
2009	"Ogae video contest 2009"	Polish qualifier for the video	Won
2009	"świry"	event of the year	Won
2009	"świry"	hit of the year	Nominated
2009	" plebiscyt Onet.pl"	summer hit "dziękuję"	Won
2009	"plebiscyt party"	hero party	Won
2009	"plebiscyt interia.pl"	music video of the year	Won
2009	"plebiscyt interia.pl"	Poland sexiest star	Won
2010	Eska Music Awards 2010	Video Clip of the Year - Rany	Won
2010	"Polish hit of the decade"	pop song of the decade "nie daj się"	Won
2010	"Polish hit of the decade"	hit of the decade "katharsis"	Won
2010	"Polish hit of the decade"	artist of the decade	5th place
2010	"rumors year 2009"	journalists' award	Won
2010	"rumors year 2009"	star of the year	2nd
2010	47.KFPP w Opolu	Award photographers and journalists	Won
2010	"plebiscyt party"	couple of year	Won
2010	"plebiscyt party"	hero party	Nominated
2010	"viva fine"	most beautiful Polish woman	Nominated
2010	"Róże gali"	Special Award gala	Won
2010	"OGAE Video Contest 2010"	Polish qualifier for the video	Nominated
2011	Bravoora 2010	Singer	Won
2011	"micros popcorn"	personality of the year	Won
2011	"Bravoora"	star two decades	2nd place
2011	"successful year"	Leader of the Year 2010 in Health Care - Charity	Won
2011	"star Charity"	Involvement in social program	Won
2011	"oskary fashion"	best dressed singer	Won
2011	"rumors year 2010"	Event of the year (social action for the benefit of patients with leukemia)	Won
2011	"rumors year 2010"	star of the year	Won
2011	"plebiscyt glamour"	the woman glamour	Won
2011	My youtube	-	Won
2011	"plejada top ten "	singer	Won
2011	"Best Dressed Poles in 2011"	the biggest impression	Won
2011	"European Polonia Festival"	the best singer	Won
2011	"ekscecy 2011"	eksces damski	Nominated
2011	"OGAE Video Contest 2011 - Polish representative selection	Polish qualifier for the contest Video ("Bad Girls")	Nominated
2011	"OGAE Video Contest 2011 - Polish representative selection	Polish qualifier for the contest Video ("Bad Girls")	Nominated
2011	"EVMA"	European best video ( "Bad Girls")	Won
2011	"Plebiscyt Interia.pl"	music video of the year	3rd place
2011	"niegrzeczni 2011"	naughty singer	Nominated
2011	"niegrzeczni 2011"	naughty song ( "XXX")	Nominated
2012	Bravoora 2011	Singer	2nd place
2012	osobowości roku 2011	Personality 2011	Won
2012	niegrzeni 2012	naughty song (fuck it)	5th place
2013	"Bravoora"	singer of the year	Nominated
2013	Róże gali	music for the (fly high tour)	Nominated
2013	"alladyn"	Charity work	Won
2014	"niegrzeczni 2014"	naughty singer	Nominated
2014	"world music awards"	the best singer	Nominated
2014	"world music awards"	the best song (”Singing in the Chains”)	Nominated
2014	"world music awards"	"the best artist"	Nominated
2014	"world music awards"	Best Artist Concert	Nominated
2015	"Przebój lata RMF FM 2015"	summer hit (nie pytaj mnie)	Nominated
2015	"plebiscyt party.pl"	artist of the year	Won
2015	"Plebiscyt party.pl"	hit of the year (riotka)	Won
2016	"fryderyki 2016"	music video of the year	Nominated
2016	53.KFPP w Opolu	Grand prix audience (nie daj sie)	Nominated
2016	53.KFPP w Opolu	Platynowa telekamera	Won
2016	"Daf Bama music awards"	the best video	Won
2016	"Daf Bama music awards"	The Best Polish singer 2016	Won
2016	"Plebiscyt Party.pl"	Artist of the year	Won
2016	"Grabarynki 2016"	The best boots	Won
2016	"Plebiscyt Super expres"	Star of 25 anniversary	Nominated
2016	"Plebiscyt Super expres"	Special award	Won
2016	"Polish LGBT Awards"	Music	Nominated
2017	Tygodnik Nowodworski	"Nagroda Specjalna Redaktora Naczelnego za nieocenioną i bezinteresowną pomoc ciężko choremu Filipkowi Ulańskiemu w 2015 roku"	Won
2017	Gwiazdy Plejady 2017	superstar Plejady	Won
2017	Party	10th anniversary star of party magazine	Won

== MTV Awards ==
Year	Nominee / work	Award	Result
2007	Doda	Best Polish Act	Won
2009	Doda	Best Polish Act	Won
2009	Doda	Best European Act	2nd place
2011	Doda	Best Polish Act	2nd place
2023	Doda	Best Polish Act	Won

== Viva Comet Awards ==
Year	Nominee / work	Award	Result
2007	Doda	Artist of the Year	Won
2007	Doda	Chart Awards	Nominated
2007	Doda	Image of the Year	Won
2007	"Katharsis"	Music Video of the Year	Won
2008	Doda	Artist of the Year	Won
2008	Doda	Chart Awards	Won
2008	Doda	Image of the Year	Won
2008	"Nie Daj Się"	Music Video of the Year	Won
2010	"Rany"	Music Video of the Year	Won
2010	Doda	Artist of the Decade	Won
2010	"Szansa"	Song of the Decade	Won
2011	Doda	Artist of the Year	Won
2012	"XXX"	Music Video of the Year	Won
