= Doda discography =

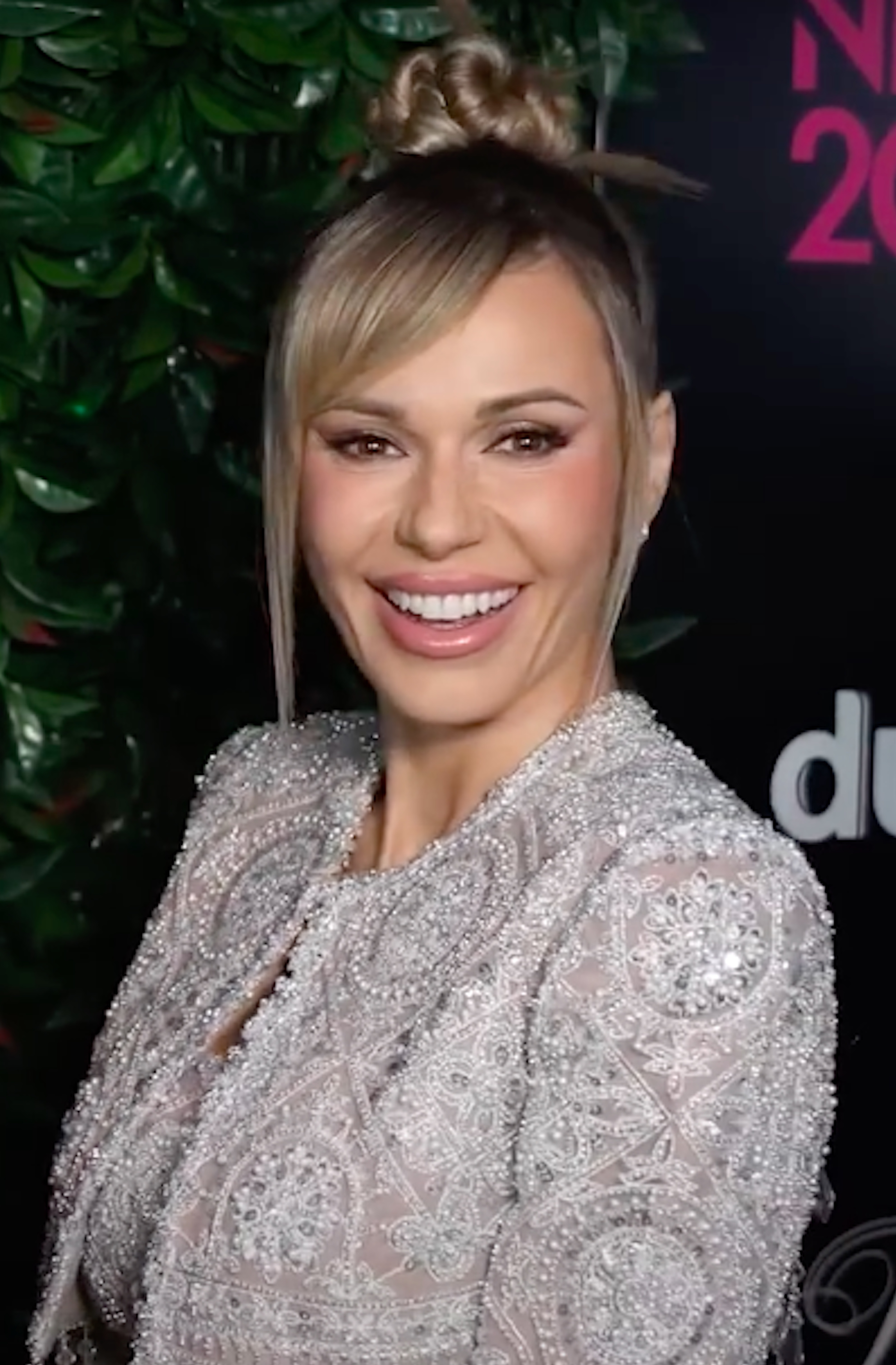
- Doda in 2022
- Studio albums: 4
- Live albums: 2
- Singles: 28
- Music videos: 28
- Promotional singles: 6

Polish singer-songwriter Doda has released four studio albums, two live albums, twenty eight singles, six promotional singles, and twenty eight music videos.

== Albums ==
=== Studio albums ===
| Title | Details | Peak chart positions | | Sales | Certifications |
| Title | Details | POL | EUR | Sales | Certifications |
|---|---|---|---|---|---|
| Diamond Bitch | Released: 27 July 2007; Label: Universal Music Poland; Formats: CD, CD/DVD, LP, digital download, streaming | 1 | 66 | POL: 45,000 | ZPAV: Platinum |
| 7 pokus głównych | Released: 30 May 2011; Label: Universal Music Poland; Formats: CD, LP, digital download, streaming | 4 | * | | ZPAV: Platinum |
| Dorota | Released: 25 January 2019; Label: Agora S.A; Formats: CD, LP, digital download, streaming | 4 | * | | |
| Aquaria | Released: 21 October 2022; Label: Universal Music Poland; Formats: CD, LP, digital download, streaming | 2 | * | | ZPAV: 3× Platinum |
"*" denotes the chart did not exist at that time.

=== Live albums ===
| Title | Details | Peak chart positions |
| Title | Details | POL |
|---|---|---|
| Fly High Tour – Doda Live | Released: 14 March 2014; Label: FM Productions, Warner Music Poland; Formats: CD/DVD, digital download, streaming | 17 |
| Riotka Tour | Released: 20 April 2017; Label: Kino Świat; Formats: DVD | — |
"—" denotes items which were not released in that country or failed to chart.

== Singles ==
=== As lead artist ===
| Title | Year | Peak chart positions | | | | | Certifications | Album |
| Title | Year | POL | POL New | POL TV | POL Stream. | POL Billb. | Certifications | Album |
|---|---|---|---|---|---|---|---|---|
| "Katharsis" | 2007 | — | * | | | | | Diamond Bitch |
| "To jest to" | 2007 | — | * | | | | | Diamond Bitch |
| "Nie daj się" | 2008 | — | * | | | | | Diamond Bitch |
| "Rany" | 2009 | — | * | | | | | Diamond Bitch |
| "Dziękuję" | 2009 | — | * | | | | | Diamond Bitch |
| "Bad Girls" | 2010 | — | — | 2 | * | | | 7 pokus głównych |
| "XXX" | 2011 | — | — | — | * | | | 7 pokus głównych |
| "Kac Wawa" | 2012 | — | — | — | * | | | Kac Wawa |
| "Twa energia" (with Dżaga) | 2012 | — | — | — | * | | | Non-album single |
| "Fuck It" (featuring Fokus) | 2012 | — | — | — | * | | | 7 pokus głównych |
| "Electrode" | 2013 | — | — | — | * | | | 7 pokus głównych |
| "Wkręceni (High Life)" | 2013 | — | 3 | — | * | | | Wkręceni and Fly High Tour – Doda Live |
| "Riotka" | 2014 | — | 4 | — | * | | ZPAV: Platinum | Riotka Tour |
| "Nie pytaj mnie" | 2015 | — | 2 | — | * | | ZPAV: Gold | Riotka Tour |
| "Nie wolno płakać" | 2018 | — | — | — | * | | | Dorota |
| "Nie mam dokąd wracać" | 2019 | — | — | — | * | | | Dorota |
| "Don't Wanna Hide" | 2021 | — | — | — | * | | ZPAV: Platinum | Girls to Buy and Aquaria |
| "Fake Love" | 2021 | 6 | 4 | 2 | * | | ZPAV: Platinum | Aquaria |
| "Melodia ta" | 2022 | 4 | 1 | 1 | * | — | ZPAV: 4× Platinum | Aquaria |
| "Wodospady" | 2022 | — | — | — | * | — | ZPAV: Platinum | Aquaria |
| "Zatańczę z aniołami" | 2023 | 22 | * | | 63 | — | ZPAV: Platinum | Aquaria |
| "Pewnie już wiesz" | 2023 | — | * | | — | — | ZPAV: Platinum | Aquaria |
| "Nim zajdzie słońce" (with Smolasty) | 2023 | 1 | * | | 1 | 1 | ZPAV: 3× Diamond | Non-album single |
| "Mama" | 2023 | 8 | * | | — | — | ZPAV: Gold | Aquaria |
| "Nie żałuję" (featuring Smolasty) | 2024 | 5 | * | | 58 | — | ZPAV: 2× Platinum | Aquaria |
| "Pamiętnik" | 2026 | 5 | * | | 19 | — | ZPAV: Platinum | Non-album single |
"—" denotes items which were not released in that country or failed to chart. "*" denotes the chart did not exist at that time.

=== As featured artist ===
| Title | Year | Peak chart positions | Album |
| Title | Year | POL TV | Album |
|---|---|---|---|
| "Muzyki moc" (as part of VIVA and Friends) | 2010 | 2 | VIVA 10 lat |
| "Między nami pokój" (Bohdan Łazuka featuring Doda) | 2017 | — | Nocny Bohdan – Duety |
"—" denotes items which were not released in that country or failed to chart.

=== Promotional singles ===
| Title | Year | Album |
|---|---|---|
| "Bad Girls" (English version) | 2010 | Non-album single |
| "Not Over You" | 2015 | Non-album single |
| "You Are the One" | 2016 | Non-album single |
| "Krakowski spleen" | 2019 | Dorota |
| "Girls to Buy" (featuring Maria Sadowska) | 2022 | Girls to Buy |
| "My Melody" | 2022 | Aquaria |

== Other charted and certified songs ==
| Title | Year | Peak chart positions | Certifications | Album |
| Title | Year | POL Stream. | Certifications | Album |
|---|---|---|---|---|
| "Diamenty" (2115 featuring Doda) | 2022 | 75 | ZPAV: Gold | Rodzinny biznes |

== Other appearances ==
List of non-single guest appearances
| Title | Year | Album |
|---|---|---|
| "Hej" (Lubert featuring Doda) | 2014 | Z miłości do muzyki |
| "Diamenty" (2115 featuring Doda) | 2022 | Rodzinny biznes |

== Music videos ==
=== As lead artist ===
| Title | Year | Director(s) |
|---|---|---|
| "Katharsis" | 2007 | Anna Maliszewska |
| "Nie daj się" | 2008 | Anna Maliszewska |
| "Rany" | 2009 | Bo Martin, Dorota Rabczewska |
| "Dziękuję" | 2009 | Anna Maliszewska |
| "Bad Girls" | 2011 | Unknown |
| "XXX" | 2011 | Takumi Koyama |
| "Kac Wawa" | 2012 | Unknown |
| "Twa energia" (with Dżaga) | 2012 | Bartosz Łukasiuk, Patryk Grabarczyk |
| "Fuck It" (featuring Fokus) | 2012 | Xawery Żuławski |
| "Electrode" | 2013 | Jarek Bolińsko |
| "Wkręceni (High Life)" | 2014 | Unknown |
| "Riotka" | 2014 | Michał Bolland |
| "Nie pytaj mnie" | 2015 | Michał Bolland |
| "Nie wolno płakać" | 2018 | Konrad Aksinowicz |
| "Nie mam dokąd wracać" | 2019 | Konrad Aksinowicz |
| "Don't Wanna Hide" | 2021 | Olga Czyżykiewicz |
| "Fake Love" | 2021 | Kamil Stanek |
| "Melodia ta" | 2022 | Adam Romanowski |
| "Wodospady" | 2022 | Adam Romanowski |
| "Zatańczę z aniołami" | 2023 | Krzysztof Grudziński |
| "Pewnie już wiesz" | 2023 | Marcin Ziółko, Dorota Rabczewska |
| "Nim zajdzie słońce" (with Smolasty) | 2023 | Piotr Zajączkowski |
| "Nie otwieram oczu" | 2023 | Michał Pańszczyk, Dorota Rabczewska |
| "Mama" | 2023 | Przemysław Dzienis |
| "Nie żałuję" (featuring Smolasty) | 2024 | Piotr Zajączkowski |
| "Pamiętnik" | 2026 | Mac Adamczak |

=== As featured artist ===
| Title | Year | Director(s) |
|---|---|---|
| "Muzyki moc" (as part of VIVA and Friends) | 2010 | Jacek Szymczak, Marek Kremer |
| "Między nami pokój" (Bohdan Łazuka featuring Doda) | 2017 | Piotr Remiszewski |
