= Konrad Aksinowicz =

Polish film, TV commercial and music video director and writer

- Born: November 8, 1978 (age 47); Wrocław, Poland
- Education: School of Visual Art, Sydney, Australia
- Occupations: film, TV commercial and music video director and writer
- Notable work: Alabama; Powrót do tamtych dni W spirali Zamiana

Konrad Aksinowicz is Polish film, TV commercial and music video director and writer.

== Films ==
Whilst in high school he started creating short films, one of them being Alabama, which won him the Minister of Education prize in 1996.

He studied filmmaking at School of Visual Arts in Sydney, Australia. He then took up a course of screenwriting in Fox Studio under the guidance of Robert McKee, which changed his attitude towards story concept. He returned to Poland in 2004 where he gained recognition as a TV commercial and music video director.

His films Zamiana and W spirali were nominees to the "Golden Duck Award" (Polish: Złote Kaczki) at the Gdynia Film Festival, the latter also nominated for the "Golden Claw" category (Polish: Złoty Pazur).

On 10 December 2021 his film Powrót do tamtych dni with Maciej Stuhr, Weronika Książkiewicz and Teodor Koziar was released in the cinemas. The film was well received at the Tallinn Black Nights Film Festival in 2021 and received the Youth Film Award as part of the Just Film section.

== Music videos ==
He directed and created music videos for Margaret on songs on her album Monkey Business; What You Do, Byle jak and Blue Vibes.

He also directed Doda's Nie wolno płakać and Nie mam dokąd wracać music videos.

== Personal life ==
His father was an alcoholic and he has spoken about his AAS syndrome resulting from that experience. The film Powrót Tamtych Dni is based on these events and was widely commented on within his own family.
