= Sopot Hit Festival =

Sopot Hit Festival is an international song contest, bringing contestants and guests who are stars with world recognition. It has been transmitted annually by the Polish Television in the coastal resort of Sopot, Poland. Together with National Festival of Polish Song in Opole and Sopot Festival it the biggest Polish music festival.

== Polish Hit Summer 2008 - August 8 ==
- Quarter-finals

#	Artist	Song	Votes	Position
1	Mezo & Paula	Obudź się	1,29%	11 position
2	Kasia Nova	Broken Wings	3,02%	6 position
3	K.A.S.A.	Piękniejsza	2,04%	10 position
4	Groovebusterz	Superlover	2,69%	7 position
5	East Clubbers	Where Are You	0,95%	12 position
6	Sylwia Grzeszczak & Liber & Tabb	Nowe szanse	2,57%	8 position
7	Anthony Moon	How Can I Love You	0,53%	14 position
8	Ania Dąbrowska	Nigdy więcej nie tańcz ze mną	2,51%	9 position
9	Ewelina Flinta i Łukasz Zagrobelny	Nie kłam, że kochasz mnie	23,85%	2 position
10	Sami	Znaczek	0,46%	15 position
11	Papa D	Bezimienni	0,67%	13 position
12	Kasia Cerekwicka	Nie ma nic	5,97%	4 position
13	Ich Troje	We Play In Team	22,91%	3 position
14	Rh+	Po prostu miłość	5,84%	5 position
15	Doda	Nie Daj Się	24,70%	1 position

- Semi-finals
1. Ewelina Flinta i Łukasz Zagrobelny - Nie kłam, że kochasz mnie - 34,6%
2. Doda - Nie Daj Się - 34,5%
3. Ich Troje - We play in the team - 30,9%
- Final
  - Ewelina Flinta i Łukasz Zagrobelny - Nie kłam, że kochasz mnie (25,5%)
  - Doda - Nie Daj Się - Polish Hit Summer 2008 (45,1%)
  - Ich Troje - We play in the team (29,4%)

Stars: Kate Ryan, Monrose, Arash.

== International Hit Summer 2008 - August 9 ==
- Quarter-finals

#	Artist	Song	Votes	Position
1	Nikolina	Naked	1,03%	13 position
2	Basic Element	Feelings	1,93%	11 position
3	Jay Delano feat. R. Kay	Just Like Me	3,11%	6 position
4	Marius feat. Giulia	Rain	2,13%	9 position
5	Beats & Styles	Take It Back	2,02%	10 position
6	Charlotte Perrelli	Hero	4,02%	5 position
7	Shaun Baker feat. MaLoY	Hey Hi Hello	31,10%	1 position
8	Gary B	Step Into The Sunshine	0,89%	14 position
9	Kaye Styles feat. Akon	Shawty	3,01%	7 position
10	David Tavare feat. 2 Evissa	Hot Summer Night	11,36%	4 position
11	Pachanga	Calienta	1,54%	12 position
12	Nexx	Synchronize Lips	12,50%	3 position
13	honeyhoney	Little Toy Gun	2,52%	8 position
14	Alex C. feat. Y-ass	Du hast den schönsten Arsch der Welt	22,40%	2 position
15	Jenniffer Kae	Little White Lies	0,44%	15 position

- Semi-finals
1. Shaun Baker feat. MaLoY - Hey Hi Hello (43,7%)
2. Alex C. feat Y-ass - Du hast den schönsten Arsch der Welt (34,7%)
3. Nexx - Synchronize Lips (21,6%)
- Final
1. Shaun Baker feat. MaLoY - Hey Hi Hello - International Hit Summer 2008 (55,2%)
2. Alex C. feat Y-ass - Du hast den schönsten Arsch der Welt (29,7%)
3. Nexx - Synchronize Lips (15,1%)

Stars: Stachursky, Patrycja Markowska, Feel.
