= NEXX =

Swedish band formed in 2004

- Also known as: Natural Ex, N.E.X., NEX
- Origin: Stockholm, Sweden
- Genres: Pop, dance
- Years active: 2004–2009
- Labels: EMI Music Poland, Top Hit Records, Warner Dance Labels, Lemon Records, MediaPro Music
- Members: Johanna “Jo” Eriksson; Robert Skowronski; Sebastian Zelle

Nexx (stylised as NEXX) is a Swedish pop/dance band from Stockholm. Formed in 2004/2005, band consists of three members: Johanna "Jo" Eriksson, Robert Skowronski and Sebastian Zelle. They are most known for song "Synchronize Lips", which reached number 2 in the Romanian Top 100.

== History ==
The band owes its starts to Supernatural, a band formed in 2002 to take part in the second season of the Swedish music competition series Popstars broadcast on Kanal 5. Supernatural included both Robert Skowronski and Sebastian Zelle in addition to Mathilda Carmbrant, Sandra Leto, Linda Eriksson. Both Skowronski and Zelle had passed the auditions to be included. Supernatural went on to win season 2 of Pop Star and went on tour in 2002 and 2003. The band released the album Dreamcatcher that topped Sverigetopplistan, the Swedish Albums Chart. The band released its debut single "Supernatural" that topped the Swedish Singles Chart, followed by "Rock U" reaching number 3 and a final hit "Kryptonite" all in 2002.

At the end of 2004, ex-members of Supernatural formed the group Natural Ex as a new musical project, with Skowronski and Zelle writing new songs in their studio in Stockholm for the project. The band Natural Ex included Susanna Patoleta, part of Excellence winner of Swedish Popstar in season 1 in 2001. Natural Ex' debut single was "Stay by My Side" that appeared in the Swedish Dance Chart and had an active radio run, It was also popular in Finland, Poland and Russia.

Skowronski and Zelle both had a passion for clubbing and dancing and were influenced by artists like Madonna, Basement Jaxx, Kylie Minogue and 1970s and 1980s disco acts. Robert Skowronski began repetitions in Stockholm for famous ABBA musical, Mamma Mia!, where he became good friend with Johanna "Jo" Eriksson, who was also in the cast. Skowronski and Zelle searched lead female voice for band, and in short time after musical, Jo Eriksson was included in project. The band recorded new materials renamed as N.E.X., NEX and eventually NEXX and toured extensively for two years throughout Sweden, Finland and Latvia.

In 2006, a follow-up single for "Stay by My Side" was released titled "Straight to Bed" using the amended name N.E.X. and "Don't Go", a cover of the Yazoo hit. Both had airplays on Swedish dance radio.

In 2007 NEXX began collaborating with top Swedish producer Jonas Von Der Burg, who also worked with September, Danny, Alcazar. Along with him and Ivan Lisinski (Bananarama and Dani Minogue) they wrote the song "Synchronize Lips", which became in a short time a big hit single in several countries, including Poland and Romania. On 9 August 2008 NEXX took part in Sopot Hit Festival, where it ranked third in category International hits, with the song "Synchronize Lips". NEXX toured Sweden, Finland, Latvia, Romania, Moldova and Poland promoting the single.

On 24 April 2009 NEXX won the Eska Award in category "ImprEskowy Hit Roku" for the song "Syncronize Lips". First band album, also titled Synchronize Lips, was released also in Romania. On 18 April 2009 it reached number #2 on the Romanian Top 100 staying 10 weeks in the Top 10 in Romania and 6 weeks in the "Dance Chart" on the local Music Channel. The song "Synchronize Lips" was also named "Debut of the Year" by Romanian Copyright Office (ORDA).

During 2009 Romanian Music Awards ceremony, NEXX performed as guest artists. In 2011 NEXX released their new song "Put Your Hands" featuring vocals by the Romanian singer Marius Nedelcu.

== Members ==
- Johanna "Jo" Eriksson
- Robert Skowronski born 28 April 1980 in Warsaw, is a Polish-Swedish musician, songwriter and A&R music producer with Warner Music Sweden. He was member of Supernatural (2002) and in NEXX. He has continued producing for acts like Alina Devecerski, Alcazar, Sanna Nielsen, Oscar Zia, David Lindgren, Molly Sandén, Christian Walz, Swingfly, Charlotte Perrelli, Youngblood etc.
- Sebastian Zelle, born 20 August 1980 in Lund is a Swedish musician, songwriter and DJ, member of Supernatural (2002) and in NEXX

== Discography ==
Albums

- 2009: Synchronize Lips

Singles

- 2005: "Stay by My Side" (credited as Natural Ex)
- 2006: "Don't Go" (credited as Natural Ex)
- 2006: "Straight to Bed" (credited as N.E.X.)
- 2006: "Two of a Kind" (credited as NEX)
- 2008: "Synchronize Lips" (credited as NEXX)
- 2008: "Paralyzed"
- 2009: "Bitch Switch"
