= Virgin (band) =

Polish pop rock band

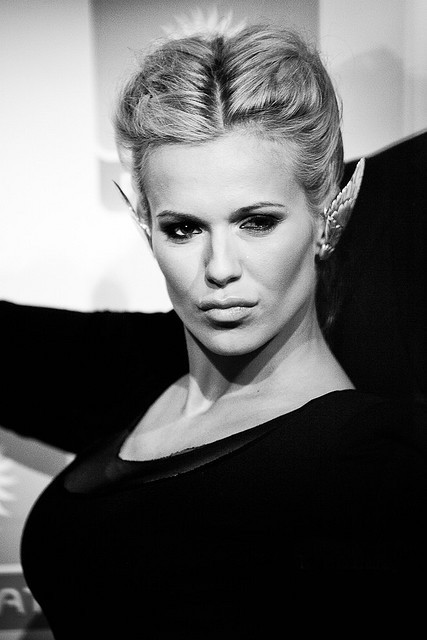
- Virgin's Lead Singer in 2010

Background information
- Origin: Warsaw, Poland
- Genres: Pop; Rock
- Years active: 2000–2007, 2014, 2016–2019
- Labels: Universal Music Poland
- Members: Dorota Rabczewska; Tomasz Lubert

Virgin is a Polish pop rock band created in 2000 that officially disbanded in 2007. They temporarily reunited in 2014, and permanently in 2016. Its lead singer is Dorota Rabczewska.

== History ==
=== Virgin (2000–2004) ===
Virgin's first album Virgin, which contained sixteen tracks, had 13,000 sales.. The songs on this album were written by Doda, Andrzej Mogielnicki, Anja Orthodox and Asia Prykowska. After the debut release of this album, Virgin was nominated for a Fryderyk award in the category of "New Face of Music 2002". The group intensively promoted the album and gave concerts while they were working on their second album. This album showed the group's rock side as well as its musical aspirations. It also included a cover of Madonna's song "Material Girl". While promoting this album, Doda took part in the reality TV show broadcast on Polsat, titled Bar.

=== Bimbo (2004–2005) ===
The band's second album titled Bimbo was released in May 2004. The title of this album is American slang for "slut". Dorota chose this title to caution "All the silly people, who think of me as a whore". On the new CD, eleven of her compositions can be found. The words for two of the songs, "Bar" and "Ulica", were written by Anja Orthodox. The singles released from this CD were "Dżaga", "Kolejny raz" and "Nie zawiedź mnie". This album also contained a feature on the song "Nie Oceniać Jej" by Arkadiusz "Arekcore" Stępień, who is a Polish guitarist and vocalist from the group Ametria.

For "Dżaga", there were two versions of the video clip (one of them includes uncensored photos where the other does not). One of the main roles in this clip was played by Radosław Majdan, goalkeeper of club Wisła Kraków. The music on Bimbo was a continuation of the themes of the first album.

In 2004, the group parted ways with its bass player Krzysztof Najman, (former husband of Anja Orthodox, vocalist of gothic rock band Closterkeller) and drummer Piotr "Posejdon" Pawłowski. As a result of several months of searching and auditions, the place of Krzysztof Najmana was taken by bass player Łukasz Damm from Wrocław, and Peter Pawłowski was substituted by percussionist Pitr Matsiak from Radom.

=== Ficca (2005–2007) ===
The group's third album, Ficca, was released on 24 October 2005. It was the first album featuring the new members. The title of this album comes from the Italian word meaning "sheath". Enclosed with the CD release of this album is an unpublished photo session of the lead musicians of the group.

The first single from this album was "Znak Pokoju", and it won the Słowika Publiczności at the 42. Sopot International Song Festival in 2005, which is voted by the public. This song wades is homage for Pope John Paul II, and deviates from the group's previous rock tone to a more melodious pop ballad. The second single from this CD was "2 Bajki", which was a big hit and successfully stayed in the charts for a long time. The next single was "Szansa", which was composed specially for the Festival in Opole.

On 23 January 2006, the re-issue of Ficca was released, which featured short clips recorded by Doda and her husband from their vacation as well as the music videos to both "Znak pokoju" and "2 bajki".

At the National Festival of Polish Song in Opole 2006, the group received a Superjedynka in category of best pop CD, and also performed the new song "Szansa" in the premiere concert, in which they won the audience vote.

On 14 June, the third edition (second re-issue) of the CD was published in a maxi version. For this edition, the addition included the song "Szansa" and "Nie zawiedź mnie" (live version) as well as karaoke versions of "Znak pokoju" i "Szansa". A special recording taken during the Opole Festival and another vacation clip is also added to this version of the CD.

On 1 January 2007, on the official website of Virgin, a statement from Tomasz Lubert was released in which he said that he is parting ways with the group. This effectively disbanded the group and Dorota Rabczewska decided to continue her music career as a soloist, releasing her debut album Diamond Bitch in 2007.

=== Virgin Box (2006) ===
In 2006 the previous three albums were released as an individual album titled, Virgin Box. The Virgin Box was a three disc set.

== Discography ==
=== Studio albums ===
Title	Album details	Peak chart positions	Sales	Certifications
Title	Album details	POL	Sales	Certifications
Virgin	Released: 16 September 2002; Label: Universal Music Poland; Formats: CD, digital download	31	POL: 15,000+	POL: Gold
Bimbo	Released: 17 May 2004; Label: Universal Music Poland; Formats: CD, digital download	1	POL: 30,000+	POL: Platinum
Ficca	Released: 24 October 2005; Label: Universal Music Poland; Formats: CD, digital download	1	POL: 100,000+	POL: 3× Platinum
Choni	Released: 10 November 2016; Label: Universal Music Poland; Formats: CD, digital download	24		

=== Music videos ===
Title	Year	Directed	Album
"To ty"	2002	Tomasz Lubert	Virgin
"Mam tylko ciebie"	2002	Adrian Rafalski, Doda	Virgin
"Dżaga"	2004	—	Bimbo
"Kolejny raz"	2004	—	Bimbo
"Nie zawiedź mnie"	2005	—	Bimbo
"Znak pokoju"	2005	Tadeusz Śliwa	Ficca
"2 bajki"	2005	Jakub Miszczak	Ficca
"Szansa"	2006	Anna Maliszewska	Ficca
"Niebezpieczna kobieta"	2016	Miroslaw Kuba Brozek	"Choni"
"Kopiuj-wklej"	2016	Justyna Dudek, Marek Marlikowski	"Choni"
"Sens"	2017	Justyna Dudek	"Choni"
"Miłość na etat"	2018	Antonio De Pérez	"Choni"
