= Diamond Bitch =

Studio album by Doda
- Released: 27 July 2007
- Recorded: 2007
- Genre: Pop rock
- Length: 43:18
- Label: Universal Music Polska
- Producer: Mark Tysper

Doda chronology
Diamond Bitch (2007)	7 Pokus Głównych (2011)

Singles from Diamond Bitch
- 1. "Katharsis" Released: June 2007; 2. "To jest to" Released: September 2007; 3. "Nie daj się" Released: July 2008; 4. "Rany" Released: February 2009; 5. "Dziękuję" Released: April 2009

Professional ratings
Review scores
Source	Rating
Dziennik	3/6 stars
EMPiK	link
Interia	link
Merlin.pl	link
Onet.pl	link
Teraz Rock	link

Diamond Bitch is the debut solo studio album by Polish pop-rock singer Doda, recorded after her band Virgin disbanded. Released in Poland on 27 July 2007, it debuted at number one and remained there for five consecutive weeks.

The album was re-released in August 2008 under the same title. It contains all the songs from the standard version, except for the song "To Jest To" which was removed due to plagiarism, but included a new single called "Nie daj się", which was a national success. Apart from the new song, it also contained two karaoke tracks, a cover of Madonna's "Like a Virgin", and a DVD containing all of her and Virgin's music videos plus extra behind the scenes content.

== Description ==
Diamond Bitch is Doda's first solo album. It includes 12 pop rock songs. All of them are sung in Polish and were produced by a Swedish music producer Mark Tysper. Each copy of the album contains a poster and is decorated with pink feathers.

== Chart performance ==
It was announced that the album went gold before it was even released due to it being pre-ordered by over 15,000 people in Poland. On the week it released, it debuted at number one on the official Poland Album Chart and stayed there for five weeks, becoming one of the most successful albums of the year. The album was eventually certified platinum with sales of 45,000 units.

== Track listing ==
Standard
No.	Title	Music	Length
1.	"Całkiem Inna"	Typser, Grizzly, Mack, Agnieszka Trojanowicz	3:36
2.	"To jest to"	Lindfors, Tysper	3:16
3.	"Katharsis"	Doda, Mikis Cupas, Tysper	4:14
4.	"Ćma"	Doda, Alfonzetti Lyander, Tysper	3:25
5.	"Misja"	Doda, Marcin Nierubiec	3:45
6.	"Cheerleaderka"	Doda, Alfonzetti, Lyander, Aldeheim, Tysper	3:40
7.	"Prowokacja"	Doda, Alfonzetti, Lyander, Typser	3:13
8.	"Ostatni Raz Ci Zaśpiewam"	Doda, Tysper, Starkie	3:56
9.	"Judasze"	Doda, Hed, Westfal, Alfonzetti, Lyander, Tysper	3:02
10.	"Rany"	Doda, Sebastian Piekarek	3:34
11.	"Dziękuję"	Doda, Tysper	4:19
12.	"Diamond Bitch"	Doda, Tysper, Grizlly, Mack, Agnieszka Trojanowicz	3:27

Re-edition
No.	Title	Music	Length
1.	"Nie daj się"	Doda, Marek Kościkiewicz	3:36
2.	"Całkiem Inna"		3:16
3.	"Katharsis"		4:14
4.	"Ćma"		3:25
5.	"Misja"		3:45
6.	"Cheerleaderka"		3:40
7.	"Prowokacja"		3:13
8.	"Ostatni Raz Ci Zaśpiewam"		4:06
9.	"Judasze"		3:02
10.	"Rany"		3:34
11.	"Dziękuję"		4:39
12.	"Diamond Bitch"		3:27
13.	"Dziękuję"		4:39
14.	"Diamond Bitch"		3:27

DVD Content
- Music videos
1. Nie Daj Się
2. Katharsis
3. Szansa
4. 2 Bajki
5. Znak Pokoju
6. Kolejny Raz
7. Nie Zawiedź Mnie
8. Dżaga
9. To Ty
10. Mam Tylko Ciebie
- W studio i na planie Nie daj się
1. Doda nagrywa singla
2. Doda na planie teledysku
- Wspominki z dzieciństwa
1. Tato, już...?
2. Od małego miałam parcie na szkło...
3. Pierwszy występ w moim życiu...
4. Moje niezapomniane przeżycie – – ślubowanie...
5. Mój pierwszy występ przy fortepianie przed rodziną
6. Moje pierwsze show"
7. Mój pierwszy turniej tańca
8. Pierwszy raz na dużej scenie śpiewam kolędę
9. Sylwesteł, cuksy i landłynki
10. Mój pierwszy występ w Telewizji Publicznej...
11. Kącik poezji śpiewanej
12. Piosenka, dzięki której dostałam się do Teatru Buffo
13. Moja pierwsza nagroda za piosenkę aktorską
14. 50% talentu i 95% pracy...
15. POLSKA MADONNA...
16. Mój pierwszy wywiad

== Charts and certifications ==
=== Charts ===
Chart (2007)	Peak position
European Top 100 Albums (Billboard)	66
Polish Albums (ZPAV)	1

=== Certifications ===
Region	Certification	Certified units/sales
Poland (ZPAV)	Platinum	30,000^{*}
^{*} Sales figures based on certification alone.

== Personnel ==
- Doda – vocals
- Mark Tysper – keyboards, bass, guitar, drums, programming, vocals
- Marcin Trojanowicz – keyboards, programming, vocals
- Sebastian Piekarek – guitar, vocals
- Krzysztof Patocki – drums
- Anita Konca – vocals
- Paweł Łuczak – keyboards

== Release history ==
Region	Date	Format	Label
Poland	July 27, 2007	Standard Edition	Universal Music Polska
Poland	August 29, 2008	Reedition	Universal Music Polska
