= Maloy Lozanes =

Spanish Filipino singer

MaLoY Lozañes
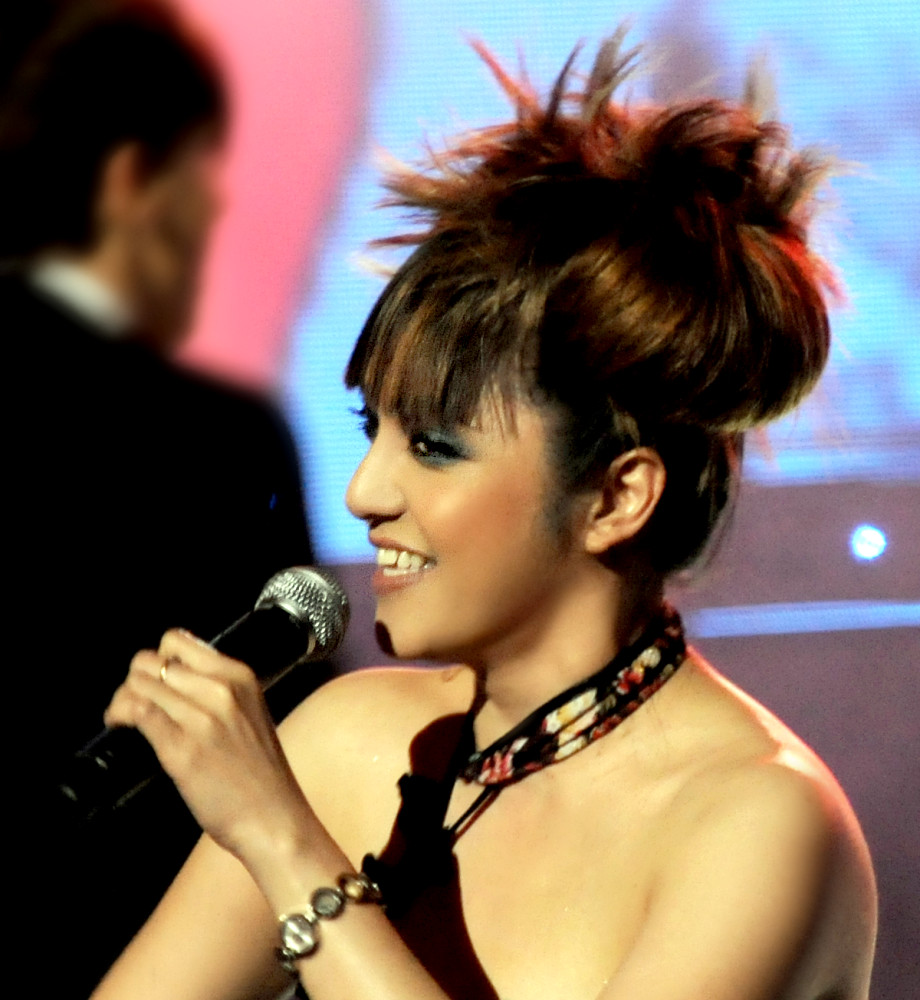
- Maloy performing in August 2008

Background information
- Also known as: MaLoY
- Born: Maria Lucia Moreno Lozañes
- Origin: Philippines; currently Germany
- Genres: Pop; dance; techno; europop; eurodance; dance-rock
- Instruments: Vocals
- Years active: 1993- present
- Labels: BMG; Marlboro Music; Ministry Of Sound; LOGIC Records; Uptunes; Shoot! Music; Universal Czech Republic; Universal Poland
- Website: http://www.maloy.biz

Maria Lucia Moreno Lozañes, better known by her stage name MaLoY, is a Spanish Filipino singer. She was the second female singer of the German Eurodance act Captain Jack from 1999 until 2001. After taking a break from the record music scene, she returned in 2006 with the German DJ act Shaun Baker.

== Discography ==
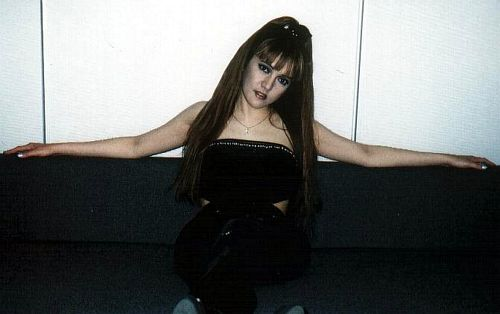
MaLoY

- 1997 – Toybox
  - "Love To The Limit" (Single)
- 1999 – Captain Jack
  - "Dream A Dream" (Single)
  - "Get Up" (Single) – featuring the "Gipsy Kings"
  - "The Captain's Revenge" (Album)
- 2000 – Captain Jack
  - "Only You" (Single)
- 2007 – Shaun Baker
  - "V.I.P." (Single)
  - "POWER" (Single)
- 2008 – Shaun Baker
  - "Hey, Hi, Hello" (Single)
  - "Could You, Would You, Should You" (Single)
- 2009 – Shaun Baker
  - "Give" (Single)
- 2010 – Shoot! Music feat. MaLoY
  - "Step 2 the Music" (Single)
- DIVERSE
  - Dance Dance Revolution – KONAMI Video Game
  - Tonight Is The Night – Le Click Album – dubbing vocals only

== Releases ==
- SINGLES – (1997–2000)
  1. "Love To The Limit" (Toybox) – released only in Germany
    (1997)
  2. "Dream A Dream" (Captain Jack) – reached Top 97 of the German Billboard Charts
    (May 3, 1999)
  3. "Get Up" (Captain Jack featuring the "Gipsy Kings") – reached Top 23 of the German Billboard Charts
    (July 23, 1999)
  4. "Only You" (Captain Jack)
    (November 11, 1999)
- SINGLES – (2007–2010)
  1. "V.I.P." (Shaun Baker) – reached Top 2 of the Official German Download Dance Charts & went to No. 1 in Poland & Czech Republic
    (March 1, 2007) – released only for Download
  2. "POWER" (Shaun Baker) – reached No. 1 on the German iTunes Dance Charts, Austrian iTunes Dance Charts & Deutsche DJ Charts
    (October 1, 2007) – released only for Download
  3. "Hey, Hi, Hello" (Shaun Baker) – winning song of (Sopot Hit Festival) 2008 in Poland on August 9, 2008.
  4. "Could You, Would You, Should You" (Shaun Baker) – released on November 28, 2008
  5. "Give" (Shaun Baker) – released in Germany on May 29, 2009
  6. "Step 2 the Music" (Shoot! Music feat. MaLoY) – released in Germany on March 17, 2010
- ALBUMS (1999–2005)
  1. "The Captain's Revenge" (Captain Jack)
    (1999)
  2. "The Race" (Captain Jack) – released only in Japan
    (1999)
  3. "Greatest Hits" (Captain Jack)
    (2005)
  4. "Captain's Best" (Captain Jack) – Japan release
    Best Hits & New Songs Album
  5. "ONE" (Shaun Baker)
- COMPILATION ALBUMS
  1. Dance Dance Revolution – KONAMI Video Game
- CHARITY CD
  1. Together – Artists Together for Kosovo
    – Charity song with other German artists for the children of Kosovo
- DUBBING VOCALS
  1. Tonight Is The Night – Le Click Album

== Television appearances ==
- 1999:
  - "Summer Special in Mallorca, SPAIN" with Ricky Martin, Backstreet Boys, Lou Bega, Geri Halliwell, Sophia Loren, Tyra Banks and many more.
  - Wetten, dass..?
  - VIVA Interaktiv
  - ZDF Chart Attack
  - ARD Immer Wieder Sonntags
  - ZDF Fernsehgarten
  - NBC GIGA
  - WDR Die Sendung Mit der Maus
