= Girls to Buy =

- Polish: Dziewczyny z Dubaju
- Directed by: Maria Sadowska
- Written by: Mitja Okorn, Dimitrij Potochnik, Lucas Coleman
- Produced by: Dorota Rabczewska
- Starring: Katarzyna Figura, Jan Englert
- Cinematography: Artur Reinhart
- Edited by: Doda, Emil Stępień
- Music by: Lanberry, Patryk Kumór, Dominic Buczkowski and Doda
- Distributed by: Phoenix Productions
- Release date: November 26, 2021
- Running time: 146 minutes
- Country: Poland
- Language: Polish

Girls to Buy (Polish: Dziewczyny z Dubaju; lit. 'Girls from Dubai') is a 2021 Polish erotic drama film about the life of Dubai escort girls. It stars Paulina Gałązka, Olga Kalicka, Katarzyna Sawczuk, Giulio Berruti, Katarzyna Figura, Jan Englert, Beata Ścibak-Englert, Anna Karczmarczyk and Kuba Jugo.

Girls to Buy is a story about Polish celebrities who went to Dubai for the purposes of sex work. The book Girls from Dubai (Polish: Dziewczyny z Dubaju) was written by Piotr Krysiak in 2018, on the basis of which Doda, a singer turned producer, decided to make a film. Maria Sadowska took on as director.

== Plot ==
A young ambitious girl is dreaming of a better life. When the opportunity arises, she dives in without hesitation, becoming an exclusive high-end escort in the Middle East. Soon at the invitation of Arab sheiks, she begins to recruit Polish girls, celebrities, actresses and models. However, this inaccessible, luxurious world will soon show its dark side. Based on true stories, Girls to Buy exposes the hypocrisy of the Polish show business and uncovers the truth behind the "Dubai scandal".

== Cast ==
- Paulina Gałązka
- Olga Kalicka
- Katarzyna Sawczuk
- Giulio Berruti
- Katarzyna Figura
- Jan Englert
- Iacopo Ricciotti
- Andrea Preti
- Luca Molinari
- Beata Ścibak-Englert
- Anna Karczmarczyk
- Józef Pawłowski

== Reception ==
=== Box office ===
The film was shot in Poland, France and the United Arab Emirates, with a budget that has been kept under wraps. The film had the best opening for a domestic film in 2021, racking up 278,000 ticket sales. It’s also the second-best result overall, with only the most recent James Bond action film, No Time to Die, selling more tickets during the first weekend of its Polish release: 440,000. During the second weekend after the premiere, the movie attracted 602 383 viewers in front of the screens. According to the distributor, Kino Świat, "the current box office result of the film classifies it as the biggest Polish hit of the year". As of December 2021, the film was screened at cinemas in Great Britain, Germany, the Netherlands, Ireland, Belgium, Luxembourg, Sweden, Denmark, Norway, United States, and Iceland.

=== Critical response ===
Girls to Buy, which boasts a cast of international male actors, had a great opening weekend. It came as something of a surprise, given that the audience for domestic films in Poland kept dropping during the pandemic. According to the Polish critics, Girls from Dubai, also known as Girls to Buy, was effectively produced, where most of the scenes shown on the screen were full of beauty, luxury, and glitz. In addition, the critics stated that the plot was moving very quickly and efficiently during the first part of the film, while it slowed down in the second part of the movie becoming a bit more chaotic.
