= Paulina Gałązka =

Polish actress (born 1989)

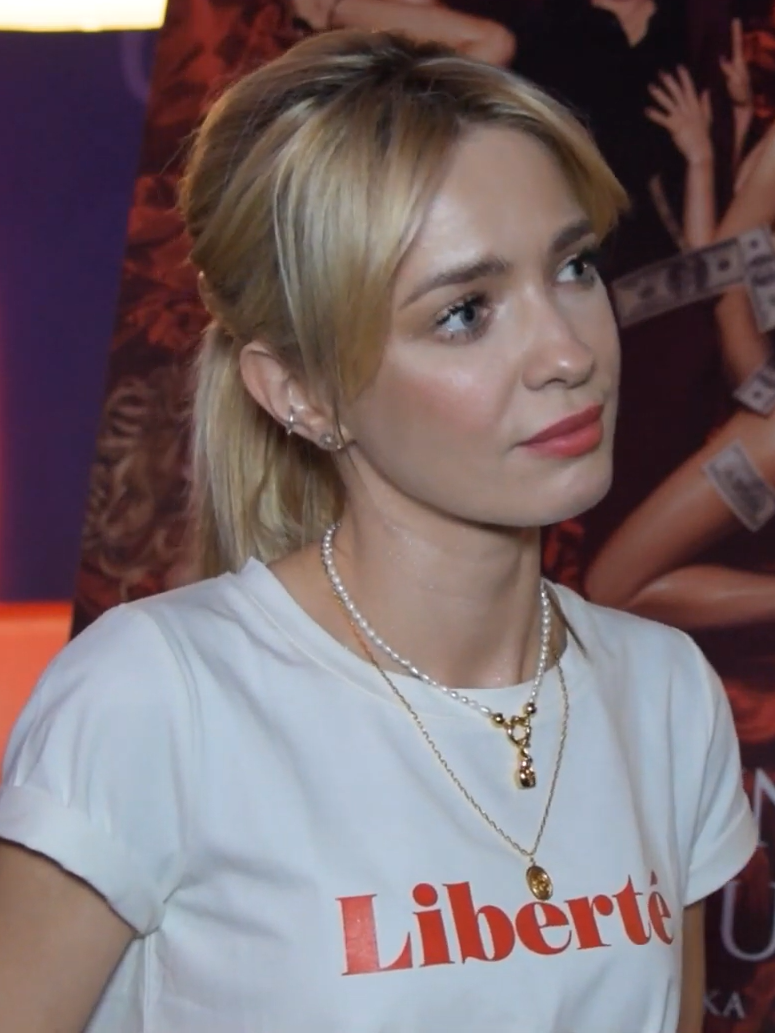
- Gałązka in 2021
- Born: 21 August 1989 (age 36); Warsaw, Poland
- Education: Łódź Film School
- Occupation: Actress
- Years active: 2012–present
- Spouse: Sindre Sandemo (m. 2016)

Paulina Gałązka (Polish pronunciation: [pawˈlina ɡaˈwɔ̃ska]; born 21 August 1989) is a Polish actress.

== Biography ==
Gałązka grew up in the Praga district of Warsaw. Her father is from Mrozy and her mother is from Sokołów Podlaski. After a year of studying international relations at the University of Warsaw, she enrolled in the Łódź Film School, from which she graduated in 2013. She has been a member of the Ateneum Theatre since 2013, when she made her theater debut in A Streetcar Named Desire. She married Norwegian filmmaker Sindre Sandemo in 2016.

== Filmography ==
=== Film ===
Year	Title	Role	Notes	Ref.
2012	The Girl from the Wardrobe	Girl		
2014	Stones for the Rampart	Baśka		
2015	Żyć nie umierać	Monika		
2015	Nowy Świat	Paweł's girlfriend		
2015	Król życia	Young woman		
2015	The Lure	Rybka		
2016	Afterimage	Wasińska		
2017	Bodo	Susi		
2018	Kobieta sukcesu	Kama		
2018	A Young Man with High Potential	Klara		
2018	Juliusz	Anetka		
2018	A Cat with a Doga	Doctor		
2018	Playing Hard	Agata		
2019	Na bank się uda	Olga		
2020	All My Friends Are Dead	Jolanta		
2021	The End	Pola Adamska		
2021	Furioza	Mimi		
2021	Girls to Buy	Emi		
2022	Where the Devil Can't Go, He Sends a Woman	Sabrina		
2022	Bejbis	Agnieszka		
2023	Na twoim miejscu	Kaśka		
2023	Where the Devil Can't Go, He Sends a Woman 2	Sabrina		
2023	Horror Story	Maja		
2024	Fuks 2	Anna Bychawska		
2024	Kill Me If You Dare	Dagmara		
2024	Sami swoi. Początek	Nechajka Słobodzian		
2024	Barbie	Barbie	Voice (Polish dub)	
2024	Diabeł	Kaja		
2025	Death Before the Wedding	Ika Rylska		

=== Television ===
Year	Title	Role	Notes	Ref.
2012–2021	Komisarz Alex	Anna Falencka; Ola Bilska; Agata	3 episodes	
2013–2019	Friends	Łukasz's girlfriend; Joasia Kwietniewska	2 episodes	
2013–2024	Na dobre i na złe	Dominika Kwietniewska; Magda	30 episodes	
2014–2017	First Love	Joanna "Aśka" Dworzak	197 episodes	
2015	Skazane	Marta Janisz	7 episodes	
2016	Bodo	Susi	2 episodes	
2016–2019	Father Matthew	Magda; Mariola Walenta	2 episodes	
2017	Niania w wielkim mieście	Inga	1 episode	
2017	Lekarze na start	Daria Masny	1 episode	
2018	Druga szansa	Iza	6 episodes	
2018	Drogi wolności	Marynia Biernacka	13 episodes	
2018–2020	Signs	Dorota	14 episodes	
2019	Dziewczyny ze Lwowa	Hanna Dalecka	6 episodes	
2019	Zakochani po uszy	Milena	24 episodes	
2020	Archiwista	Zuzanna Wasiluk	13 episodes	
2021	Klangor	Ola Majdzik	4 episodes	
2021	Komisarz Mama	Aleksandra	1 episode	
2021	Furioza	Mimi	4 episodes	
2021–2023	The Office PL	Dominika	2 episodes	
2023	Emigracja XD	Rysia "Rachel"	2 episodes	
2023	Warszawianka	Agnieszka	3 episodes	
2023	Rafi	Lilly	10 episodes	
2023	Tajemnice polskich fortun	Sabrina	7 episodes	
2025	Czarne stokrotki	Maja Opalińska	6 episodes	

=== Music videos ===
Year	Title	Artist	Role	Ref.
2018	"Serce Nie Sługa"	Ania	Herself	

== Awards and nominations ==
Award	Year	Category	Nominated work	Result	Ref.
Septimius Awards	2022	Best European Actress	Girls to Buy	Won	
