= Back to Those Days =

2021 Polish film by Konrad Aksinowicz

- Polish theatrical release poster
- Polish: Powrót do tamtych dni
- Directed by: Konrad Aksinowicz
- Written by: Konrad Aksinowicz
- Produced by: Agnieszka Chromicka
- Starring: Teodor Koziar; Weronika Książkiewicz; Maciej Stuhr
- Cinematography: Jakub Jakielaszek
- Edited by: Witold Chomiński
- Music by: Marcin Mirowski
- Production company: Chroma Pro
- Distributed by: Kino Świat
- Release date: 12 September 2021 (Gdynia)
- Running time: 104 minutes
- Country: Poland
- Language: Polish

Back to Those Days (Polish: Powrót do tamtych dni) is a 2021 Polish coming of age drama film written and directed by Konrad Aksinowicz. Originally titled Return to Legoland (Polish: Powrót do Legolandu), it premiered at the Polish Film Festival on 12 September 2021.

== Premise ==
Like many children in 1990s post-communist Poland, Tomek lives with his mother Helena while his father Alek works in the United States. When Alek unexpectedly returns to Poland, he brings money and expensive gifts, but his alcohol addiction soon takes over the family.

== Cast ==
- Teodor Koziar as Tomek Malinowski
- Weronika Książkiewicz as Helena Malinowska
- Maciej Stuhr as Alek Malinowski
- Katarzyna Warnke as Eve
- Sebastian Stankiewicz as Romek
- Bogdan Koca as Stanisław Pipa
- Anna Majcher as Danka
- Kacper Janusiński as Daniel Słabiak
- Marek Marchewa as Rajmund "Moskit" Moskicki

== Production ==
Set and shot in Wrocław, the film is semi-autobiographical and based on director Konrad Aksinowicz's own childhood in the Szczepin housing estate. Newcomer and Wrocław native Teodor Koziar was persuaded by his mother to audition for the role after having attended theater classes for a short time.
