= What You Do (Margaret song) =

Single by Margaret

from the album Monkey Business
- Released: 12 May 2017
- Genre: Pop; electronic
- Length: 3:04
- Label: Extensive; Warner; Magic; Broma16
- Songwriters: Margaret; Arash; Robert Uhlmann; Anderz Wrethov; Thomas Karlsson
- Producers: Robert Uhlmann; Alex P; Victory

Margaret singles chronology
"Blue Vibes" (2017)	"What You Do" (2017)	"6 in the Morning" (2017)

Music video
- "What You Do" on YouTube

"What You Do" is a song by Polish singer Margaret. It was released as the lead single from her third studio album, Monkey Business (2017), on 12 May 2017. The song was written by Margaret, Arash, Robert Uhlmann, Anderz Wrethov and Thomas Karlsson, and produced by Uhlmann, Alex P and Victory.

The single peaked at number 14 in Poland, and received radio airplay in Sweden where it reached number one on the Rix FM chart.

Live recording of "What You Do" from Margaret's MTV Unplugged concert special was released on its accompanying live album in 2023.

== Music video ==
A music video for the song was released on 12 May 2017. It was filmed in Cyprus, and directed by Konrad Aksinowicz. The video depicts Margaret as the star of a video game.

== Track listing ==
Digital single
No.	Title	Writer(s)	Producer(s)	Length
1.	"What You Do"	Margaret; Arash; Robert Uhlmann; Anderz Wrethov; Thomas Karlsson	Uhlmann; Alex P; Victory	3:04
2.	"What You Do" (Extended)			4:42

== Accolades ==
Year	Ceremony	Category	Result	Ref.
2017	RMF FM and Polsat's Hit of the Summer	Hit of the Summer	Nominated	

== Charts ==
=== Weekly charts ===
Weekly chart performance for "What You Do"
Chart (2017)	Peak position
Poland Airplay (ZPAV)	14

=== Year-end charts ===
Year-end chart performance for "What You Do"
Chart (2017)	Position
Poland (Airplay 2017)	91

== Release history ==
Region	Date	Format	Label	Ref.
Various	12 May 2017	Digital download; streaming	Extensive Music; Warner Music	
Poland	12 May 2017	Digital download; streaming	Magic Records	
Russia	12 May 2017	Digital download; streaming	Broma16	
