= Robert Skowronski =

Swedish musician (born 1980)

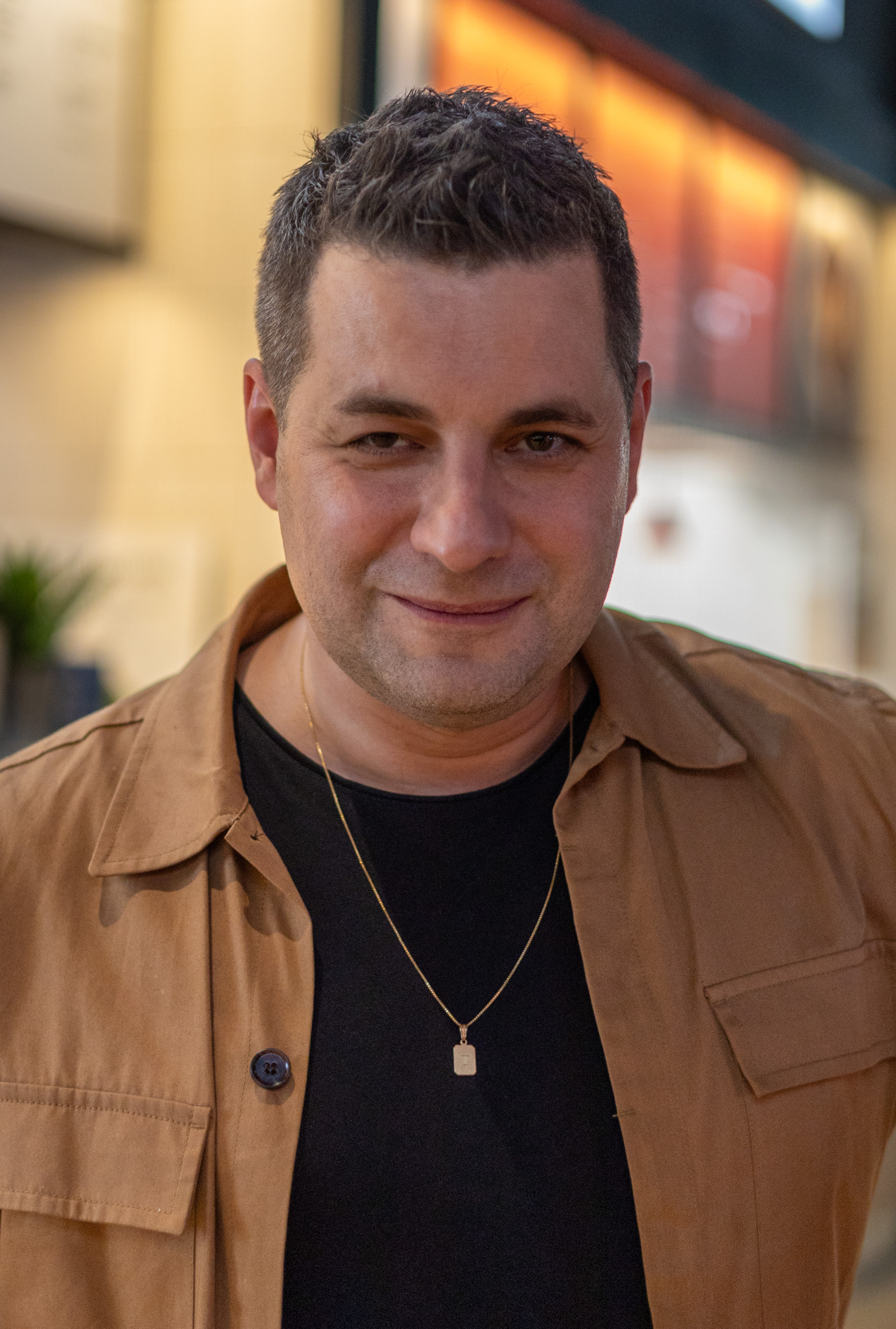

Background information
- Born: Robert Krzysztof Skowronski; 28 April 1980 (age 46); Warsaw, Poland
- Occupations: Musician; songwriter; record producer
- Formerly of: Supernatural; NEXX

Robert Krzysztof Skowronski (born 28 April 1980) is a Polish-born Swedish musician, songwriter and record producer. He participated at Melodifestivalen 2025 as a songwriter for the winning song "Bara bada bastu" performed by the group KAJ.

== Biography ==
Robert Skowronski studied at Urdang Academy in London, where he completed the three-year musical artist training. He participated in the talent show Popstars on Kanal 5, where he won, and made his breakthrough with the group Supernatural the same year. Skowronski has been a member of the pop group NEXX and was also a member of the show group Male for a period. He has participated in the Melodifestivalen 2007, where he danced and sang behind Elin Lanto and Jimmy Jansson. Together with the rest of the former ensemble from the Swedish Mamma Mia! cast, he recorded all the choral music for the film of the same name. In 2009, Skowronski and the other members of NEXX were awarded the prize for International Hit of the Year at the Eska Music Awards in Poland and as Newcomer of the Year in Romania.

Skowronski is now a co-owner of the music label and publisher Emperial. Some of the artists he has collaborated with as A&R are Alina Devecerski, Alcazar, Sanna Nielsen, Oscar Zia, David Lindgren, Molly Sandén, Christian Walz, Swingfly, Charlotte Perrelli, and Youngblood. He participated at Melodifestivalen 2025 as a songwriter for the winning song "Bara bada bastu" performed by Swedish-speaking Finnish group KAJ.

== Personal life ==
Skowronski lives in Stockholm.
