= Kill Me If You Dare =

2024 film by Filip Zylber

- Polish: Zabij mnie, kochanie
- Directed by: Filip Zylber
- Written by: Hanna Węsierska
- Produced by: Magdalena Szwedkowicz
- Starring: Weronika Książkiewicz; Mateusz Banasiuk; Agnieszka Więdłocha; Piotr Rogucki; Mikołaj Roznerski; Paulina Gałązka; Mirosław Baka
- Cinematography: Mateusz Wichłacz
- Edited by: Tomasz Ciesielski
- Music by: Paweł Lucewicz
- Production company: MAG Entertainment
- Distributed by: Netflix
- Release date: 13 February 2024
- Country: Poland
- Language: Polish

Kill Me If You Dare (Polish: Zabij mnie, kochanie) is a 2024 Polish romantic comedy film directed by Filip Zylber. It is a remake of the 2019 Turkish film Öldür Beni Sevgilim. It was released on Netflix on 13 February 2024.

== Premise ==
When a husband and wife win the lottery, they begin plotting to kill each other.

== Cast ==
- Weronika Książkiewicz as Natalia Rozwadowska
- Mateusz Banasiuk as Piotr Rozwadowski
- Agnieszka Więdłocha as Agata
- Piotr Rogucki as Łukasz
- Mikołaj Roznerski as Krystian
- Paulina Gałązka as Dagmara
- Mirosław Baka as Bogdan

== Production ==
The film was shot in Warsaw and Nowy Sącz, and around Lake Rożnów.

== Release ==
The film was released on Netflix on 13 February 2024.
