= Radosław Majdan =

Polish footballer (born 1972)

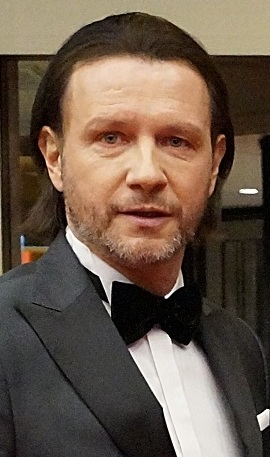
- Majdan in 2019

Personal information
- Full name: Radosław Majdan
- Date of birth: 10 May 1972 (age 54)
- Place of birth: Szczecin, Poland
- Height: 1.85 m (6 ft 1 in)
- Position: Goalkeeper

Senior career*
Years	Team	Apps	(Gls)
1989–2001	Pogoń Szczecin	225	(0)
2001–2002	Göztepe İzmir	31	(0)
2002	PAOK	4	(0)
2003	Bursaspor	6	(0)
2003	F.C. Ashdod	12	(0)
2004–2006	Wisła Kraków	65	(0)
2006–2007	Pogoń Szczecin	27	(0)
2007–2010	Polonia Warsaw	30	(0)

International career
2000–2002	Poland	7	(0)
- * Club domestic league appearances and goals

Radosław Majdan (Polish pronunciation: [raˈdɔswaf ˈmajdan]; born 10 May 1972) is a Polish former professional footballer who played as a goalkeeper.

== Club career ==
Majdan was born in Szczecin and started at hometown club Pogoń.

He moved on abroad playing for Göztepe Izmir, PAOK FC, Bursaspor and F.C. Ashdod.

He came back to the then sporting powerhouse Wisła Kraków, before ending his career back at Pogoń and Polonia Warsaw.

== International career ==
In total, he played seven matches for the Poland national team. The first was on 26 January 2000 (notably he played against U.S. in the 2002 FIFA World Cup).

== Post-playing career ==
Between 2006 and 2010 he was a member of the West Pomeranian Regional Assembly. He retired in May 2010, to become the sporting director of his last club Polonia Warsaw.

He took part in numerous television game shows and contests on Polish television, and frequently featured in gossip and tabloid newspapers.

He later went on to become a football pundit and commentator.

== Personal life ==
Majdan has many tattoos, including Pogoń Szczecin's crest across his left chest.

Majdan and his ex-wife Dorota "Doda" Rabczewska, a popular Polish pop singer, were called the "Polish Beckhams".

== Career statistics ==
Appearances, conceded goals and clean sheets by national team
National team	Year	Apps	Conceded Goals	Clean Sheets
Poland	2000	1	3	0
Poland	2001	1	0	1
Poland	2002	5	3	2
Total		7	6	3

== Honours ==
PAOK

- Greek Football Cup: 2002–03

Wisła Kraków

- Ekstraklasa: 2003–04, 2004–05
