= Aquaria (Doda album) =

Studio album by Doda
- Released: 21 October 2022
- Recorded: 2013–2015, 2021–2023
- Genres: Pop; dance-pop; electronic; dark pop
- Length: 32:30
- Languages: Polish; English
- Labels: Queen; Polydor; Universal
- Producers: Tom Martin; Jan Bielecki; Dominic Buczkowski-Wojtaszek; Patryk Kumór; Arkadiusz Kopera; Peter Wallevik; Daniel Davidsen; Olek Świerkot; Ania Dąbrowska; Yk Koi; Lorenzo Cosi; Marek Hojda

Doda chronology
Dorota (2019)	Aquaria (2022)

Singles from Aquaria
- 1. "Don't Wanna Hide" Released: 23 June 2021; 2. "Fake Love" Released: 27 December 2021; 3. "Melodia ta" Released: 7 July 2022; 4. "Wodospady" Released: 20 October 2022; 5. "Zatańczę z aniołami" Released: 3 March 2023; 6. "Pewnie już wiesz" Released: 26 June 2023; 7. "Mama" Released: 4 October 2023; 8. "Nie żałuję" Released: 20 May 2024

Aquaria is the fourth studio album by Polish singer Doda. It was released by Queen Records and Polydor Records under exclusive license from Universal Music Polska on 21 October 2022.

Aquaria is a combination of pop, dance-pop and electronic.

It peaked at number two on the Polish albums chart and has been certified three-times platinum by the Polish Society of the Phonographic Industry (ZPAV). It spawned eight singles "Don't Wanna Hide", "Fake Love", "Melodia ta", "Wodospady", "Zatańczę z aniołami", "Pewnie już wiesz", "Mama" and "Nie żałuję".

== Track listing ==
Credits adapted from the liner notes.

Aquaria – Physical standard edition
No.	Title	Writer(s)	Producer(s)	Length
1.	"Fake Love"	Dorota Rabczewska; Radboud Miedema; Twan Raymond de Boer; Emily Middlemas; Patryk Kumór; Dominic Buczkowski-Wojtaszek	Tom Martin; Jan Bielecki; Buczkowski-Wojtaszek; Kumór	2:25
2.	"Don't Wanna Hide"	Rabczewska; Małgorzata Uściłowska; Kumór; Buczkowski-Wojtaszek	Buczkowski-Wojtaszek; Kumór	3:01
3.	"Girls to Buy" (with Maria Sadowska)	Rabczewska; Maria Sadowska; Adrian Łabanowski; Kumór; Buczkowski-Wojtaszek	Buczkowski-Wojtaszek; Kumór	2:21
4.	"Bez Ciebie chcę żyć wiecznie"	Rabczewska; Maria Dzięcielak; Damian Skoczyk; Bielecki; Martin; Kumór; Buczkowski-Wojtaszek	Buczkowski-Wojtaszek; Kumór	2:46
5.	"Melodia ta"	Rabczewska; Gabriela Nowak-Skyrpan; Dzięcielak; Kumór; Buczkowski-Wojtaszek	Buczkowski-Wojtaszek; Kumór	2:29
6.	"No Rush" (with Jhn McFly)	Bielecki; de Boer; Kumór; Buczkowski-Wojtaszek	Buczkowski-Wojtaszek; Kumór	3:07
7.	"Do It Like I Want It"	Rabczewska; de Boer; Kumór; Buczkowski-Wojtaszek	Buczkowski-Wojtaszek; Kumór	2:26
8.	"Pewnie już wiesz"	Rabczewska; Nowak-Skyrpan; Dzięcielak; Kumór; Buczkowski-Wojtaszek	Buczkowski-Wojtaszek; Kumór	2:55
9.	"Drinking"	Rabczewska; Skoczyk; Middlemas; Martin; Kumór; Buczkowski-Wojtaszek	Martin	2:19
10.	"Tylko Ty i ja"	Anna Józefina Lubieniecka; Alexandra Rotan; Galeyn Tenhaeff; Kumór; Buczkowski-Wojtaszek	Buczkowski-Wojtaszek; Kumór	3:26
11.	"Wodospady"	Rabczewska; Nowak-Skyrpan; Dzięcielak; Martin; Kumór; Buczkowski-Wojtaszek	Martin; Buczkowski-Wojtaszek; Kumór	2:39
12.	"Zatańczę z aniołami"	Rabczewska; Nowak-Skyrpan; Dzięcielak; Skoczyk; Kumór; Buczkowski-Wojtaszek	Buczkowski-Wojtaszek; Kumór	2:36
Total length:				32:30

Aquaria – Physical deluxe edition bonus tracks
No.	Title	Writer(s)	Producer(s)	Length
13.	"Chcę Cię coraz więcej"	Arkadiusz Kłusowski; Arkadiusz Kopera	Kopera	3:52
14.	"My Melody"	Rabczewska; Nowak-Skyrpan; Dzięcielak; Kumór; Buczkowski-Wojtaszek	Buczkowski-Wojtaszek; Kumór	2:29
15.	"Waterfalls"	Rabczewska; Nowak-Skyrpan; Dzięcielak; Martin; Kumór; Buczkowski-Wojtaszek	Martin; Buczkowski-Wojtaszek; Kumór	2:39
16.	"Just You And I"	Rotan; Tenhaeff; Buczkowski-Wojtaszek	Buczkowski-Wojtaszek; Kumór	3:26
17.	"Riotka"	Kasia Popowska; Tonino Speciale; Peter Wallevik; Daniel Davidsen	Wallevik; Davidsen	3:05
18.	"Wkręceni (High Life)"	Rabczewska; Agata Trafalska; Borys Dejnarowicz; Roman Szczepanek; Olek Świerkot; Ania Dąbrowska	Świerkot; Dąbrowska	3:09
19.	"Nie pytaj mnie"	Popowska; Chelcee Grimes; Yusekae Koi; Lorenzo Cosi	Yk Koi; Lorenzo Cosi; Marek Hojda	3:19
Total length:				54:29

Aquaria – Physical reissue edition bonus tracks
No.	Title	Writer(s)	Producer(s)	Length
13.	"Chcę Cię coraz więcej"	Kłusowski; Kopera	Kopera	3:52
14.	"Nie otwieram oczu"	Rabczewska; Dzięcielak; Carla Fernandes; Kumór; Buczkowski-Wojtaszek; Piotr Zborowski	Buczkowski-Wojtaszek; Kumór; Zborowski	2:26
15.	"Mama"	Rabczewska; Dzięcielak; Fernandes; Kumór; Buczkowski-Wojtaszek; Zborowski	Buczkowski-Wojtaszek; Kumór; Zborowski	2:43
16.	"Nie żałuję" (featuring Smolasty)	Rabczewska; Norbert Smoliński; Dzięcielak; Fernandes; Kumór; Buczkowski-Wojtaszek; Zborowski	Buczkowski-Wojtaszek; Kumór; Zborowski	3:10
17.	"I'm Not Loving It"	Dzięcielak; Fernandes; Kumór; Buczkowski-Wojtaszek; Zborowski	Buczkowski-Wojtaszek; Kumór; Zborowski	2:30
18.	"Dom" (featuring Bedoes)	Rabczewska; Borys Przybylski; Dzięcielak; Fernandes; Kumór; Buczkowski-Wojtaszek; Zborowski	Buczkowski-Wojtaszek; Kumór; Zborowski	2:19

== Charts ==
=== Weekly charts ===
Chart performance for Aquaria
Chart (2022–2023)	Peak position
Polish Albums (ZPAV)	2

=== Year-end charts ===
2022 year-end chart performance for Aquaria
Chart (2022)	Position
Polish Albums (ZPAV)	43

2023 year-end chart performance for Aquaria
Chart (2023)	Position
Polish Albums (ZPAV)	47

== Certifications ==
Certifications and sales for Aquaria
Region	Certification	Certified units/sales
Poland (ZPAV)	3× Platinum	90,000^{‡}
^{‡} Sales+streaming figures based on certification alone.

== Release history ==
Release history for Aquaria
Region	Date	Format(s)	Edition(s)	Label(s)	Ref.
Various	21 October 2022	CD; digital download; streaming; Box set (Orange)	Standard; deluxe	Queen; Polydor; Universal	
Various	2 December 2022	Box set (Blue)	Deluxe	Polydor	
Various	28 April 2023	LP	Deluxe	Universal	
Various	4 October 2023	CD; digital download; streaming	Reissue	Universal	
