= Supernatural (group) =

Swedish pop group

- Origin: Stockholm, Sweden
- Genres: Pop, dance
- Years active: 2002-2004
- Members: Mathilda Carmbrant; Linda Eriksson (aka Linda Varg); Sandra Leto; Robert Skowronski; Sebastian Zelle

Supernatural was a Swedish pop group that consisted of the winners of the second season of the Swedish reality TV show Popstars. In Sweden the show was broadcast on Kanal5 in 2003. The band had several hits with songs like Supernatural and Rock U. Supernatural was expected to take part in the Swedish precursor selections for the Eurovision Song Contest in 2003 but its record label did not publicize the band sufficiently and the members subsequently split up in 2004 after arguments with their record label.

== Members ==
- Mathilda Carmbrant
- Linda Eriksson (aka Linda Varg)
- Sandra Leto
- Robert Skowronski
- Sebastian Zelle

== After split-up ==
The members of Supernatural started a new band, this time with the name Caught Up, but it did not experience the same success.

== Discography ==
=== Albums ===
Year	Album	Peak positions	Certification
Year	Album	SWE	Certification
2002	Dreamcatcher	1	

=== Singles ===
Year	Single	Peak positions	Certification	Album
Year	Single	SWE	Certification	Album
2002	"Supernatural"	1		Dreamcatcher
2002	"Rock U"	3		Dreamcatcher
2002	"Kryptonite"	56		Dreamcatcher
