= Phoenix Productions =

- Company type: Private
- Founded: August 2005
- Headquarters: 375 Greenwich St. New York City, New York 10013, U.S.
- Key people: Chris Phoenix (President/Founder)
- Parent: Phoenix Media Group Inc.
- Website: Phoenix Productions

Phoenix Productions is a New York-based creative studio that produces advertising, television, film and video production company. The company was formed in 2005 by Chris Phoenix to create the show open and graphics package for Bravo's Battle of the Network Reality Stars. It has since expanded into marketing, advertising and other programming, most notably the Comedy Central series Important Things With Demetri Martin and Jon Stewart's "Night of Too Many Stars". The company bills itself as a combination creative agency, production company and post-production house.

== History ==
While serving as the Director of Dennis Media Group (an online, broadcast and retail video division of the former publisher of Maxim magazine), Phoenix sought in 2005 to expand the purview of this video production division to service the broadcast needs of outside clients. When it was decided that the video department should focus more on online editorial content, Phoenix used an offer to create graphics packages for cable television network Bravo’s first original production, Battle of the Network Stars, as the foundation for an independent production company. Shortly following Phoenix's departure, Dennis Media Group was restructured to focus on creating video and multimedia content for the editorial branch of Dennis Digital.

== Awards ==
- ADDY Award 2013 - Award of Distinction (Silver) - Biz Asia America Promo (CCTV-America)
- ADDY Award 2013 - Award of Excellence (Bronze) - THR.com (The Hollywood Reporter)
- ADDY Award 2013 - Award of Distinction (Silver) - Saul Bass Awards (The Hollywood Reporter)
- ADDY Award 2013 - Award of Distinction (Silver) - Key Art Awards Show Open (The Hollywood Reporter)
- Silver Effie 2010 for Vaseline Men campaign starring Michael Strahan
- OMMA 2009 for Online Advertising Creativity in Email: Campaign for Important Things With Demetri Martin
- Valencia Media Award 2008 for Vaseline Men
