= Doda (singer) =

Polish singer (born 1984)

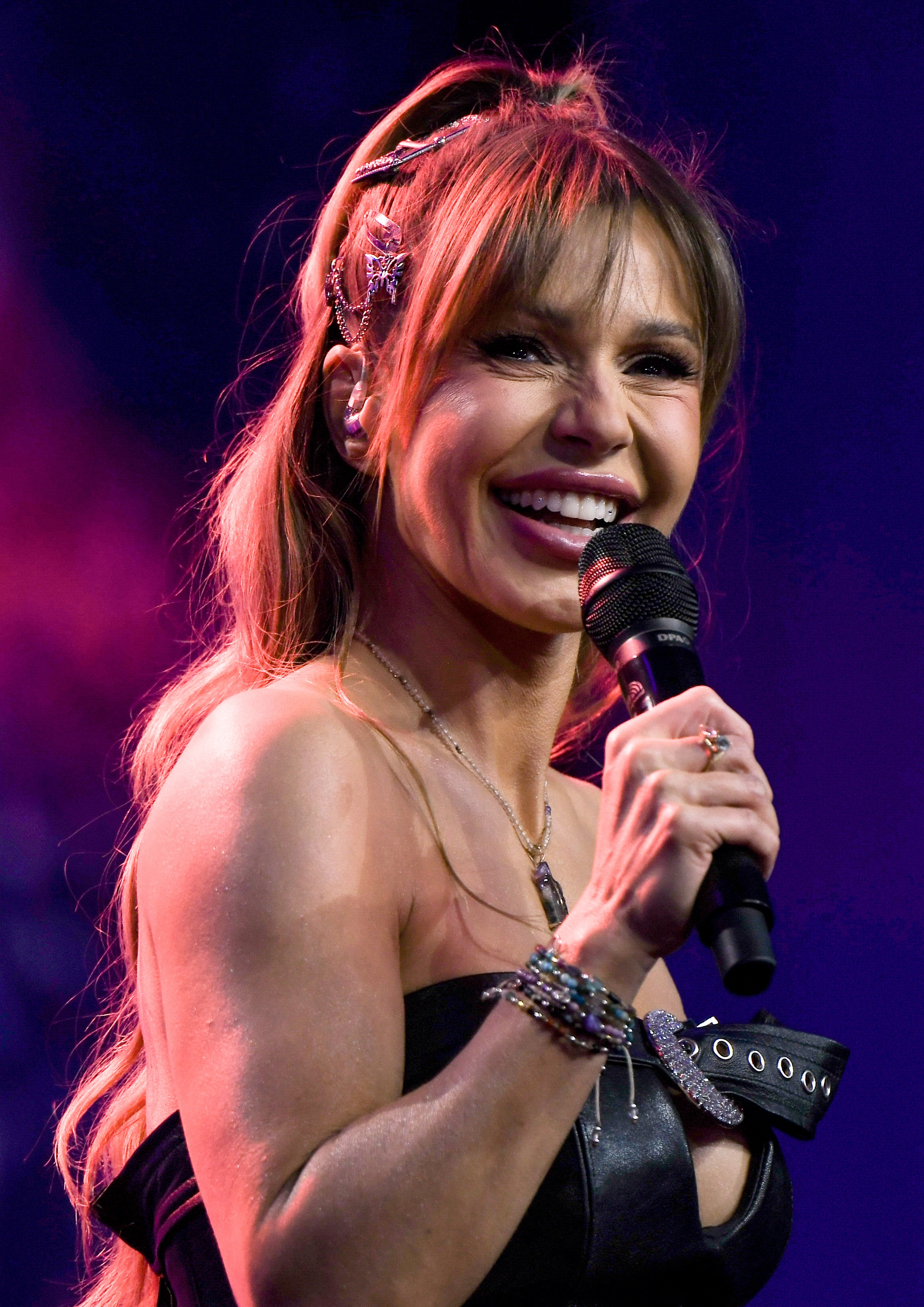
- Doda in 2023
- Born: Dorota Rabczewska; 15 February 1984 (age 42); Ciechanów, Poland
- Other names: Doda; Doda Elektroda; Dorota Rabczewska-Stępień; Dorota Aqualiteja Rabczewska
- Occupations: Singer; songwriter; television personality
- Spouses: Radosław Majdan (m. 2005; div. 2008) Emil Stępień (m. 2018; div. 2021)
- Partners: Adam Darski (2009–2011); Błażej Szychowski (2011–2012); Emil Haidar (2014–2015); Max Hodges (2021); Dariusz Pachut (2022–2024)
- Musical career
- Genres: Pop; pop rock; rock
- Years active: 1998–present
- Labels: Universal Music Poland; Warner Music Poland
- Website: doda.net.pl

Dorota Aqualiteja Rabczewska (Polish: [dɔˈrɔta rabˈt͡ʂɛfska]; born 15 February 1984), known professionally as Doda, is a Polish singer-songwriter, producer, actress and television personality. A three-time MTV Europe Music Award winner, she is one of the most-awarded Polish music artists. She has received multiple certifications from the Polish Society of the Phonographic Industry for the sales of her albums and singles in Poland. Her best known songs include "Nie daj się", "Dżaga", "Szansa", "Znak pokoju", "2 bajki", "Melodia ta" and "Nim zajdzie słońce", a collaboration with Smolasty, which topped the Polish charts and achieved three-time diamond sales in the country.

Doda rose to fame as a member of the Polish rock band Virgin, with whom she released four studio albums: Virgin (2002), Bimbo (2004), Ficca (2005) and Choni (2016). The group disbanded in 2006, briefly reuniting in 2016. Doda embarked on a solo career, releasing four studio albums: Diamond Bitch (2007), 7 pokus głównych (2011), Dorota (2019) and Aquaria (2022). In 2018, she made her acting debut in the feature film Pitbull. Last Dog.

Doda was featured on CNN's 2008 list of the 10 most famous Poles in history. She was also included on the list of the 50 best Polish female singers compiled by Machina in 2010, while Polish magazine Viva! listed her among the 10 most influential women in Poland in 2011. Wprost named Doda one of the 100 most influential Poles in 2011, and one of the 50 most influential Poles in 2019. She was also featured on its lists of the 50 most influential Polish celebrities, and the 50 most influential Polish women, in 2015 and 2017, respectively. Forbes Poland included Doda in its annual ranking of the 100 most-valuable stars of Polish show business every year from 2006 to 2014. She was the most influential public person and the most engaging artist online in Poland in 2024.

In 2011, Helen Pidd of The Guardian named Doda one of the most successful and one of the most controversial Polish musical artists of all time.

== Life and career ==
=== Early life ===
Rabczewska was born in 1984 in Ciechanów, Poland. In her youth, she was coached in athletics for four years (long jump, 100 metres). She won the Voivodeship Championships for 100 and 60 meters, long jump and shot put. She also won bronze in the Polish Championships. She then quit sports for musical career. She made her professional debut as a teenager in 1998, at the Buffo Theatre in Warsaw in the musical Metro. Simultaneously, she took singing lessons from Elżbieta Zapendowska, one of the most famous singing coaches in Poland.

=== 2000–2006: Virgin era ===
After auditioning at the age of 16, Doda became the vocalist for the Polish hard rock band Virgin. In 2002, they made their debut by releasing their first studio album titled Virgin. It was promoted by two singles: "To Ty" and "Mam tylko Ciebie". To promote the band and the album further, Doda took part in the Polish version of the reality TV series called The Bar.

Two years after their debut, the band released their second studio album called Bimbo. It was released on 17 May 2004. The album debuted at number one on the Polish Album Sales Chart. The lead single, "Dżaga", became their first mainstream hit. In its music video, Doda and her future husband Radosław Majdan – Polish goalkeeper are seen having sex. The ballads "Kolejny raz" and "Nie zawied mnie" were the following hits. Virgin Music Group launched the Bimbo Tour, their first performance tour, to promote Bimbo.

After a line-up change the group performed their new single, a power-ballad "Znak pokoju", at the Sopot International Song Festival and won its Viewers' Choice Award. It was also their breakthrough hit on the radio. On 17 October 2005, they released their third studio album called Ficca, this time with more radio-friendly pop-rock sound. It was promoted during their second concert tour called Ficca Tour. The next single was the ballad "2 bajki", another huge hit in their career.

In April 2006, Doda was rushed to hospital due to a problem with her intervertebral disc making the band fall into a hiatus for a while. After having a complicated spine surgery, she made her return with the voice role of Abba in the Polish-language version of the animated film Asterix and the Vikings. Later that year, the group released their new hit titled "Szansa", which was inspired by Doda's surgery. The song won the Grand Prix of the National Festival of Polish Song in Opole. They also released the reissue of Ficca, which spent six weeks at number one on the Polish Album Sales Chart, and sold over 100,000 copies becoming their best-selling album. Ficca was certified triple platinum by the Polish Society of the Phonographic Industry (ZPAV).

By the end of 2006, Doda parted ways with her manager. On 1 January 2007, Virgin's founder and guitarist, Tomasz Lubert, announced the group's disbandment.

=== 2007–2010: Solo career and Diamond Bitch era ===
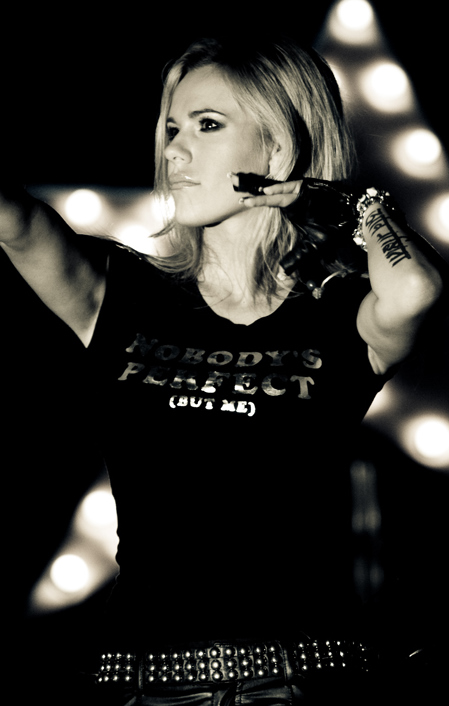
Doda during one of her performances in 2008

In 2007, Doda signed a solo contract with Universal Music Poland. On 27 July, she released her first solo studio album Diamond Bitch. It was preceded by the single, "Katharsis", which was released in June. To promote the album Doda embarked on her first solo concert tour called Diamond Tour; some concerts took place outside Poland, in Germany, the United Kingdom and the United States. The album went straight to number one on the Polish Album Sales Chart, and stayed there for five consecutive weeks. It also charted on Billboard's European Top 100 Albums chart. The album received platinum certification from ZPAV for sales of over 45,000 units. "To jest to" was chosen as the second single to promote the album, but the biggest hit, "Nie daj się", was released in June 2008. It received huge radio airplay, and topped many radio charts. It remains the biggest hit in Doda's solo career. In August 2008, Doda released the reissue of Diamond Bitch. Later that year, she made a cameo as herself in the film Serce na dłoni directed by Krzysztof Zanussi. In 2009, two final singles from Diamond Bitch were released: "Rany" and "Dziękuję".

During the Diamond Bitch era, Doda won ten VIVA Comet Awards. She won the Video of the Year award three years in a row, and also received the Artist of the Decade special award. She is the recipient of two MTV Europe Music Awards for Best Polish Act, and came second in the Best European Act category in 2009. At the 2008 National Festival of Polish Song in Opole, Doda was awarded the Best Artist Superjedynka Award.

In March 2010, she embarked on the Rock'n'Roll Palace Tour, which lasted a year.

=== 2010–2013: 7 pokus głównych era ===
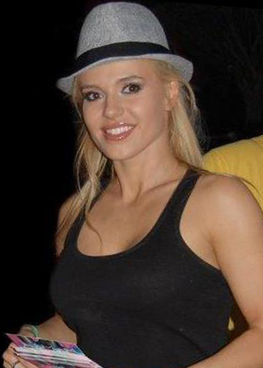
Doda at a charity concert in 2010

In June 2010, Doda released the English-language version of the first single from her second studio album, "Bad Girls". In July, the Polish-language version of the song was released. "Bad Girls" became a big hit, particularly in 2011, after the premiere of its big-budget music video, delayed due to the illness of her then-fiancé Nergal, leader of the death metal group Behemoth, who battled leukaemia. Doda's second studio album, 7 pokus głównych, was released on 30 May 2011. This time Doda presented a brand new electro-rock music style. The album was released with seven different covers, each representing different temptation. It sold over 30,000 copies, and was certified platinum by ZPAV. Songs from the album were also recorded in English, and were meant to be released internationally under the title The 7 Temptations. However, the material remains unreleased. Only a few demos were either uploaded onto Doda's official YouTube channel or her official website. These include "Let's Get It Started", "My Way or No Way", "XXX", and "Singing in the Chains", which earned Doda a 2014 World Music Award nomination for World's Best Song. 7 pokus głównych was promoted during Doda's third headline tour, The Seven Temptations Tour, which began in May 2011, and lasted a year and a half. "XXX" was the second single released from 7 pokus głównych. In November 2011, Doda became a columnist for the Polish edition of Maxim magazine, writing for its first two issues In December, she posed for Playboy USA.

In February 2012, Doda released the song "Kac Wawa", a theme from the Polish comedy movie of the same name. Also in February, Doda won VIVA Comet Award for Video of the Year for "XXX". By doing so, she surpassed the record previously held by Tokio Hotel and herself, and became the only artist in the world to win 12 VIVA Comet Awards. It was also Doda's fourth Video of the Year award. In June, she released a collaboration with her best friend and impersonator Dżaga titled "Twa Energia". At the end of 2012, another single from 7 pokus głównych was released. It was a collaboration with Polish rap legend Fokus, "Fuck It". Its controversial music video with scenes of violence between both artists was banned on TV. However, it managed to gain popularity on the internet, and amassed over one million views on YouTube within the first 24 hours of its premiere. The last single from the album was the haunty electro-ballad titled "Electrode", released in 2013.

=== 2013–2020: Concert albums, acting, Virgin reunion and Dorota ===
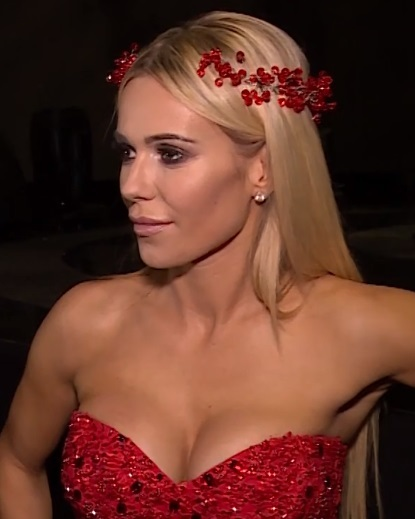
Doda in 2017

In December 2012, Doda signed a record deal with EMI Music Poland (since 2014 part of Warner Music Poland). In May 2013, she embarked on the Fly High Tour – the first in her career to be filmed, and released on a DVD as Fly High Tour – Doda Live. In October 2013, Doda released the single titled "Wkręceni (High Life)" for the Polish comedy movie Wkręceni.

Doda soon left Warner Music, and by December 2014, she re-signed with Universal Music Poland. On the New Year's Eve 2014, she released the single "Riotka", which was later certified platinum by ZPAV. Its English-language version was recorded and released as "Not Over You". In May 2015, Doda embarked on her fifth solo concert tour, Riotka Tour. One of its concerts was filmed in November 2016, and released on a DVD in 2017. On 25 June 2015, she released the single "Nie pytaj mnie". It went on to receive a gold certification from ZPAV. Both "Riotka" and "Nie pytaj mnie" were written by Chelcee Grimes who previously worked with Kylie Minogue and The Saturdays. In October 2015, Doda's manager announced that the songs would remain stand-alone singles, and would not be included on her third studio album as she decided to take a different musical direction. Their live versions were included on the concert album from Riotka Tour.

On 20 November 2015, Doda performed with Slash at his concert from World on Fire World Tour that took place in Poland. She sang "Sweet Child o' Mine" accompanied by Slash on the guitar. In May 2016, she was cast as Angelica in IMKA Theatre's play called Słownik Ptaszków Polskich. In August 2016, Virgin announced their reunion. That same month, they released their first single in ten years, "Hard Heart". In November, Virgin released their fourth studio album Choni. Its most successful single, "Kopiuj-wklej", was certified gold in Poland.

In 2017, Doda guest starred in the TV series Daleko od noszy. Reanimacja as Aniela. The following year, she starred in the feature film Pitbull. Last Dog directed by Władysław Pasikowski, which she also co-produced. She played Mira, and received favourable reviews for her performance. Her third solo studio album, Dorota, was released in 2019. It peaked at number four in Poland.

=== 2021–present: Dziewczyny z Dubaju and Aquaria ===
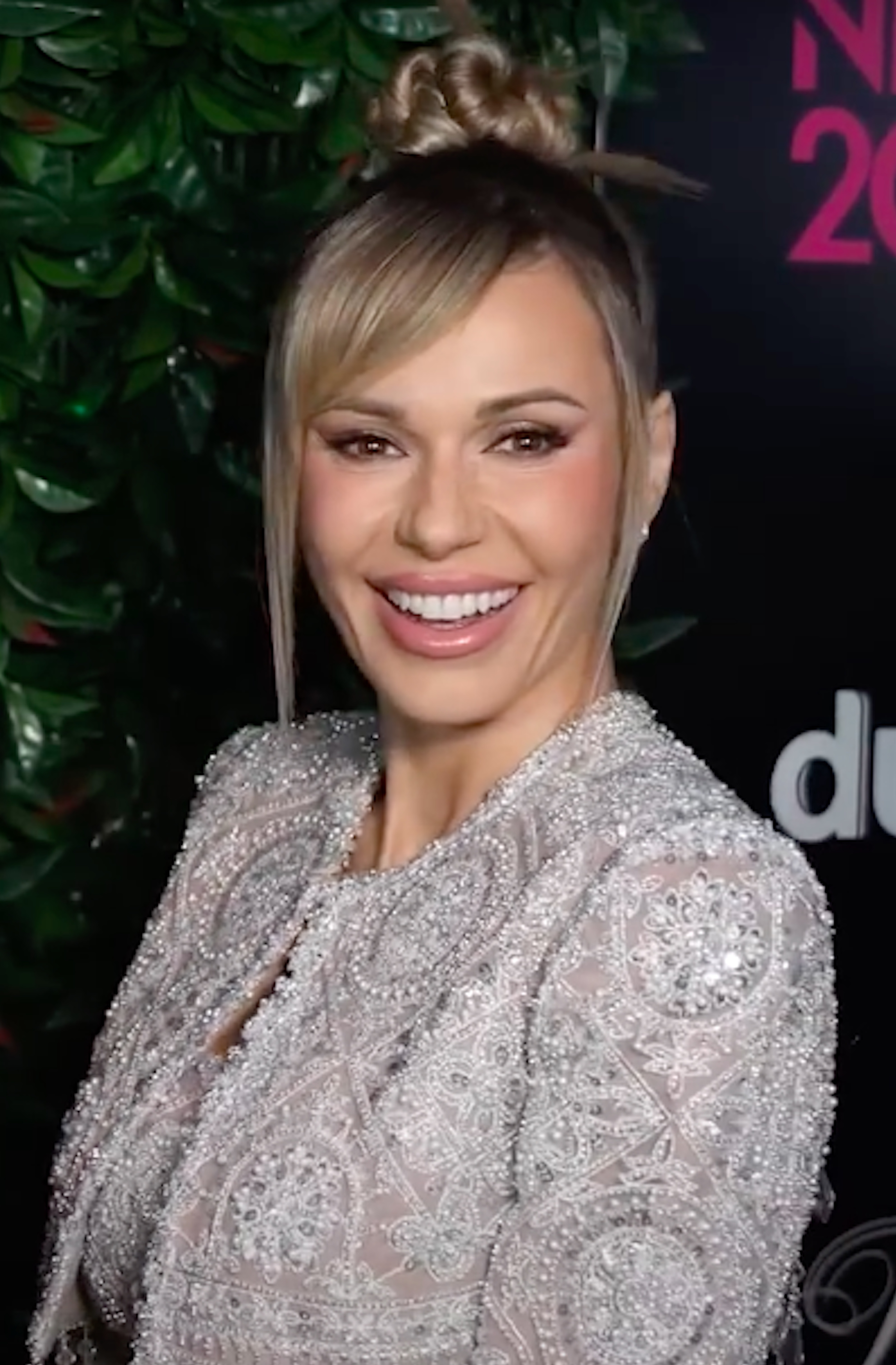
Doda in 2022

Doda produced the film Girls to Buy (Polish title: Dziewczyny z Dubaju) in 2021. That year, she released the singles "Don't Wanna Hide", "Fake Love" and "Melodia ta". In 2022, she was the main protagonist of a reality show Doda. 12 kroków do miłości (Doda. 12 Steps to Love) aired on Polsat. In December the same year, she featured as a guest in the song Diamenty by rappers Bedoes and White 2115. In 2023, Polsat launched another reality TV show Doda. Dream Show focusing on Doda, her music career and private life. In August 2023, Doda together with Smolasty released a single Zanim zajdzie słońce, which debuted as No. 1 on the Poland Songs chart.

== Personal life ==
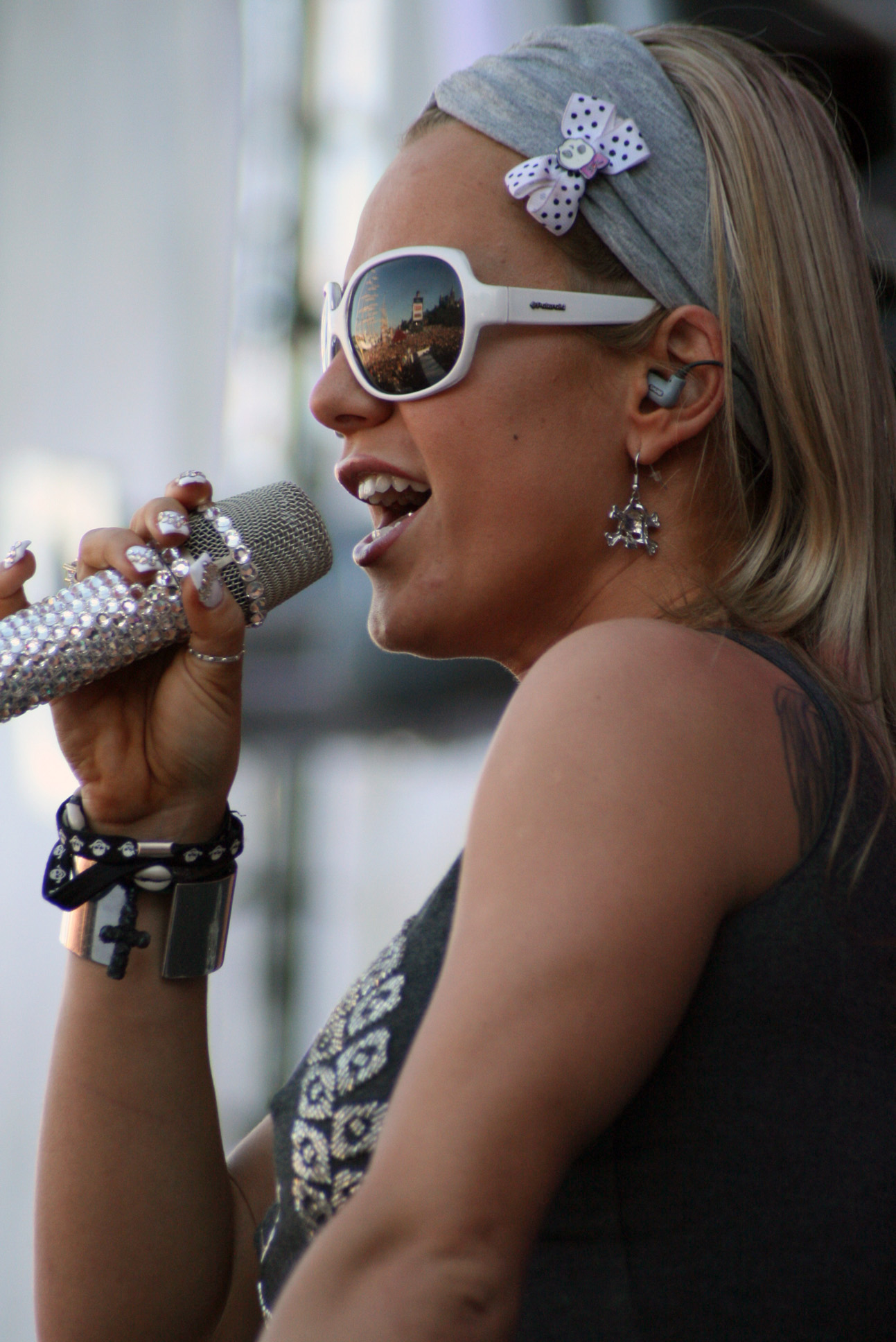
Doda in 2007

=== Family and relationships ===
Doda was born to father Paweł Rabczewski, a weightlifter, and mother Wanda, a civil servant. She has a nine-year-older half-brother Rafał with the same mother. He was her road manager. She also has a twelve-year-older half-brother Grzegorz and sixteen-year-younger half-sister Paulina with the same father.

In 2003, she met her future husband Polish goalkeeper, Radosław Majdan. He later proposed to her during their vacation in Jerusalem, and they were married on 5 March 2005. Three years later, in May 2008, the couple divorced.

On 9 May 2009, it became public that she had a relationship with the frontman of the extreme metal band Behemoth, Adam Darski (aka Nergal). In December 2009, the couple got engaged. Darski was diagnosed with leukemia, Doda offered her own bone marrow for transplant but it did not match. Doda appealed to the wider public for marrow donations, which resulted in great public response and Darski receiving the right transplant and recovering from the illness. In March 2011, it was reported that the couple had called off the engagement, and broken up. That same year, Doda started dating a choreographer Błażej Szychowski. Since 2014, she was in a relationship with a businessman Emil Haidar. In July 2015, they got engaged, but in November of that year, Doda announced that they were no longer together.

On 14 April 2018, she married film producer Emil Stępień in a private ceremony in Marbella. They got engaged the previous year, but they did not confirm their relationship until they were already married. Doda filed for divorce in 2021, which was finalised that same year. In 2022, she confirmed her relationship with traveller Dariusz Pachut. She is a member of Mensa Poland.

=== Bible controversy ===
In May 2010, the Warsaw prosecutor's office charged Doda with the crime of "offending religious sensibilities" for remarking in a year-earlier television interview that she believed more in dinosaurs than she did in the Bible because "it is hard to believe in something written by people who drank too much wine and smoked weed". In January 2012, she was found guilty and fined 5,000 złoty by local court Warszawa-Mokotów. Her appeal was not effective. In June 2012, district court in Warsaw upheld the verdict of the local court.

Some of Polish public persons, such as former Prime Minister of Poland Włodzimierz Cimoszewicz, philosopher Wojciech Krysztofiak, pharmacologist Jerzy Vetulani and members of Palikot's Movement criticized the judgment. Doda commented that "she was a victim of Polish anachronistic jurisdiction" and submitted the case to European Court of Human Rights, which was accepted for consideration in 2017. In September 2022, the tribunal ruled that the Polish state had violated the European Convention of Human Rights, which guarantees everybody the right to free speech and ordered the Polish authorities to pay Doda €10,000 in compensation.

=== Social activism ===
She is known for engaging in many charity and social events. She has financially supported a number of organizations including the ones raising funds for people suffering from multiple sclerosis and leukemia as well as for the Great Orchestra of Christmas Charity. Her activism was recognized by the readers of Newsweek Polska who awarded her the Gwiazda Dobroczynności (Charity Star) award. She also received the Health Protection Leader of the Year title for her contributions to propagating bone marrow donation and transplantology.

In January 2019, she initiated a plan to organize a special charity concert Artyści przeciw nienawiści (Artists Against Hate) in order to unite music artists in the fight against hate speech in the wake of the assassination of Paweł Adamowicz. The concert took place on 27 February 2019 in Atlas Arena in Łódź with over 100 artists participating including Maryla Rodowicz, Margaret, Sarsa, Cleo, Ewa Farna, Ewelina Lisowska, Gromee, Dawid Kwiatkowski, Patrycja Markowska, C-BooL, Beata Kozidrak, Golec uOrkiestra, Peja, Halina Mlynkova, and Blue Café.

On 3 August 2019, she showed her support for the LGBT community in Poland by performing in a rainbow outfit during the Disco pod gwiazdami concert in Białystok where a couple of weeks before violence from far-right protesters broke out during the first ever pride parade organized in the city.

In 2023, she became an ambassador of the social campaign Twarze depresji. Nie oceniam. Akceptuję (Faces of Depression. I Don't Judge. I Accept.) aimed at raising awareness of mental health issues and depression.

== Discography ==
- Diamond Bitch (2007)
- 7 pokus głównych (2011)
- Dorota (2019)
- Aquaria (2022)

== Concert tours ==
- Diamond Tour (2007–2010)
- Rock'n'Roll Palace Tour (2010–2011)
- The Seven Temptations Tour (2011–2013)
- Fly High Tour (2013–2015)
- Anty Tour (2014–2018)
- Riotka Tour (2015–2018)
- Doda with Orchestra (2019–2020)
- Aquaria Tour (2023–2024)

As guest act

- Slash' World on Fire World Tour (2015; Łodź, Poland)
- Królowie życia. 40-lecie Skawiński & Tkaczyk (2016; Warsaw, Poland)
- Maryla Rodowicz' Diva Tour (2017; 2 shows)

== Filmography ==
Title	Year	Role	Notes
Bar	2002, 2004	Herself; contestant	Seasons 2 and 4
Asterix and the Vikings	2006	Abba (voice)	Polish-dub version
Shibuya	2006	Herself; judge	Karaoke show
Jazda z Dodą	2007	Herself	Reality TV series
Gwiazdy tańczą na lodzie	2007–2009	Herself; judge	Polish version of Dancing on Ice
Serce na dłoni (English title And a Warm Heart)	2008	Singer	Feature film
Tylko nas dwoje	2010	Herself; judge	Polish version of Just the Two of Us
Daleko od noszy. Reanimacja	2017	Aniela	TV series; 1 episode
Pitbull. Last Dog	2018	Mira	Feature film; also co-producer
Girls to Buy	2021	Róża	Feature film; also producer
Doda. 12 kroków do miłości	2022	Herself	Reality TV series
Doda. Dream Show	2023	Herself	Reality TV series
Doda	2026	Herself	3-part documentary series on Prime Video

== See also ==
- Music of Poland
