= Shaun Baker (musician) =

English musician

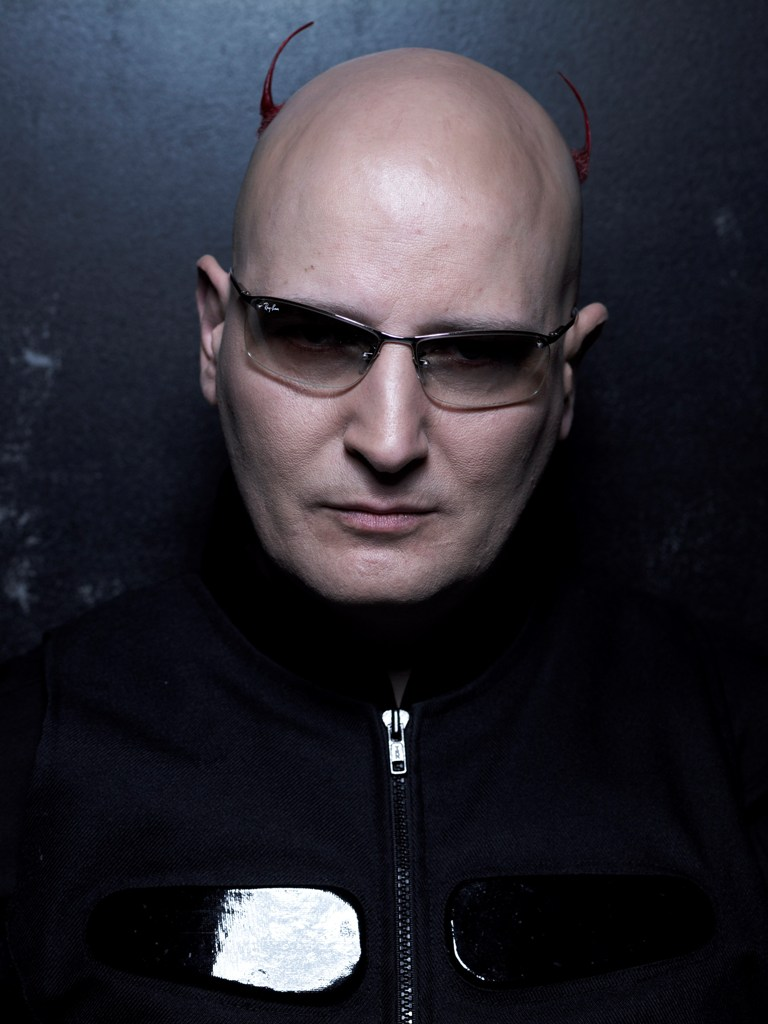
- Baker in 2006

Background information
- Born: England
- Origin: Paderborn, Germany
- Occupations: DJ, musician
- Years active: 1997–present
- Label: Uptunes
- Website: DJ-ShaunBaker.com

Shaun Baker is an English musician, DJ and record producer, currently based in Paderborn, Germany.

== Musical career ==
Baker has been playing the worldwide club scene over 20 years. Together with his friend and partner Sebastian Wolter, he also produces music. This musical partnership has over the past few years given the dance scene songs such as "Xplode 2," which hit the number 1 position in every German dance chart at the same time. Other singles are "Push" (also a dance chart & sales hit) and "Bakerman", a co-op with the cult stars Laid Back from Denmark. Laid Back were so impressed with the new version of "Bakerman" they hooked Shaun Baker and Sebastian Wolter up with Lars von Trier, who produced the video clip for the original version of "Bakerman". He gave permission to use the original video for their version. It was No. 1 in most German dance charts again and the peak position in the German sale charts was 39. The next single "V.I.P.," released in February 2007, performed well in Germany but received higher results in Slovakia and the Czech Republic. "V.I.P." hit the No. 1 position in the dance, radio and sale charts in both countries. Late summer 2007 he and Sebastian Wolter found their own record label called Uptunes. The debut release from Uptunes was his next single "Power" which is based on the "Xplode" sound, but this time featuring vocals and made the peak position in various dance charts in Germany, Slovakia and the Czech Republic. "Power" also led the German dance download charts. His debut album 1 was released on 25 July 2008. The next single "Hey Hi Hello" featured a remix from Alex Christensen and was released first in Slovakia and the Czech Republic this spring and later in Germany and elsewhere.

In 2008, he took main theme song from Czech/East German fairytale movie Three Wishes for Cinderella written by songwriter Karel Svoboda and remixed it as song "Could You Would, You Should You." There are mixed reactions to this, mainly due to the popularity of the original song.

== Discography ==
=== Singles ===
Year	Single	Peak chart positions						Album
Year	Single	AUT	CZE	GER	POL	SVK	SUI	Album
1999	"Pizza"	—	—	—	—	—	—	The Works Pt. 01
2000	"On a Helium Trip"	—	—	—	—	—	—	The Works Pt. 01
2001	"Somebody"	—	—	—	—	—	—	The Works Pt. 01
2001	"Back in Town"	—	—	—	—	—	—	The Works Pt. 01
2002	"Immortality" (with Seikos)	—	—	—	—	—	—	The Works Pt. 01
2003	"Come Back" (as Seikos Meets Baker)	—	—	—	—	—	—	The Works Pt. 01
2003	"Music, Love & Money" (as Shaun Baker presents A&B Brothers)	—	—	—	—	—	—	The Works Pt. 01
2003	"Sex on the Streets" (with Marc van Linden)	—	—	—	—	—	—	The Works Pt. 01
2004	"We Hate HipHop (F*ck U Up! Part 2) Nobody Listens To HipHop" (with Boo Selekta)	—	—	—	—	—	—	Singles only
2004	"Freestyle Fucker" (with Black Dildo)	—	—	—	—	—	—	Singles only
2004	"Be Free"	—	—	—	—	—	—	Singles only
2005	"Worldwide" (with Clubbasse)	—	—	—	—	—	—	Singles only
2005	"Xplode 2"	—	—	47	—	—	—	1
2006	"Push/Deep"	—	—	77	—	—	—	1
2006	"Bakerman" (featuring Laid Back)	44	23	39	—	74	90	Single only
2007	"Hit Me Hard" (featuring Jasmin Teutrine)	—	—	—	—	—	—	1
2007	"V.I.P." (featuring MaLoY)	—	2	—	5	21	—	1
2007	"Power" (featuring MaLoY)	—	—	—	—	—	—	1
2008	"Hey Hi Hello" (featuring MaLoY)	—	1	—	1	15	—	1
2008	"Could You, Would You, Should You" (featuring MaLoY)	—	10	—	—	57	—	1
2008	"Xplode" (featuring Hyper)	—	—	—	—	—	—	Singles only
2009	"Sunshine 2009" (vs. Dance Nation)	—	—	69	—	—	—	Singles only
2009	"Give" (featuring MaLoY)	—	22	—	73	29	—	Singles only
2009	"Blame It on the Summer" (featuring Bryce)	—	—	—	—	—	—	Singles only
2010	"Show Me 10 (Explode 3)" (with Darius & Finlay)	43	—	58	—	—	—	Singles only
2010	"Frontline"	—	—	—	—	—	—	Singles only
"—" denotes releases that did not chart
