= Weronika Książkiewicz =

Polish actress (born 1981)

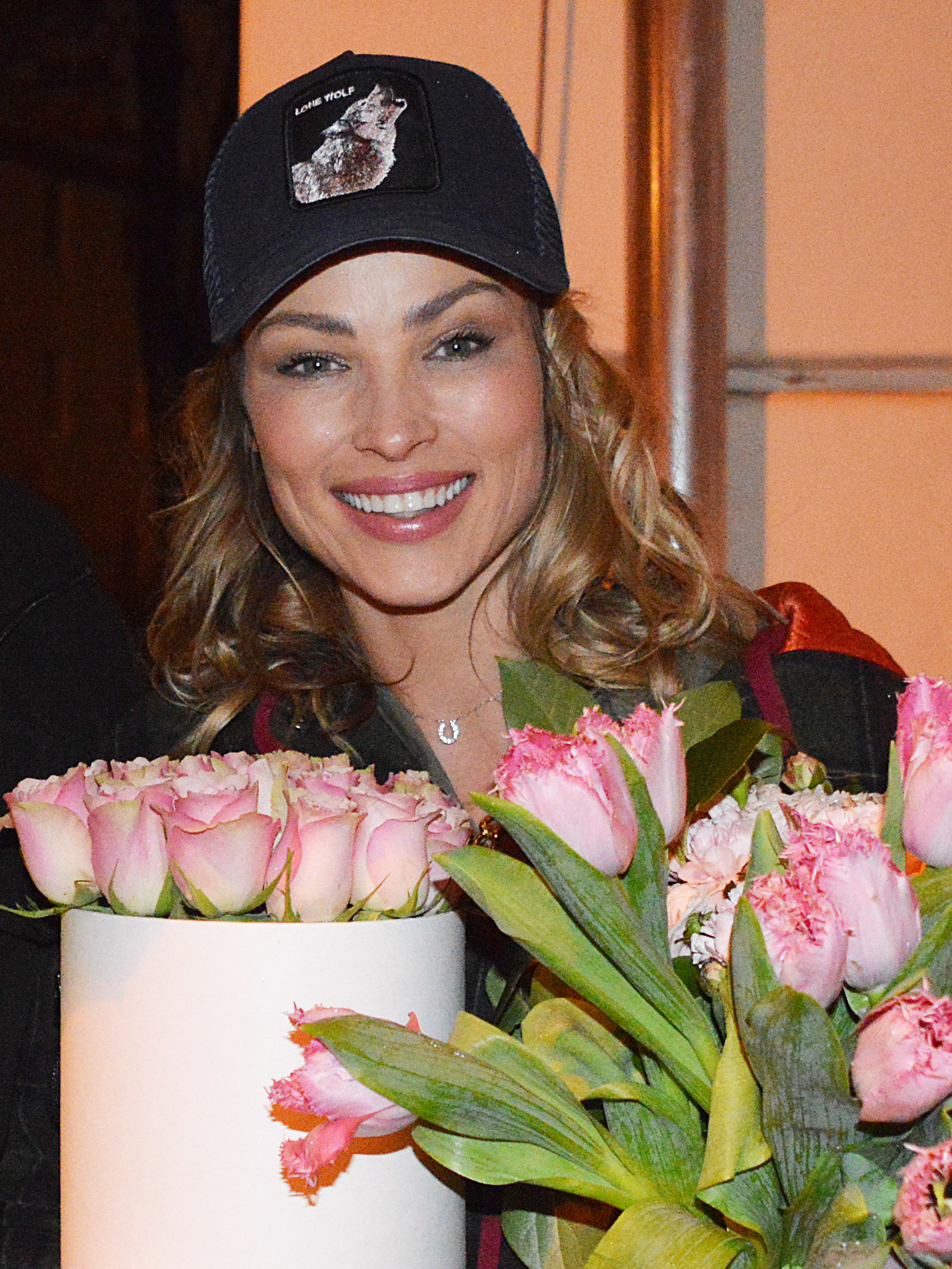
- Książkiewicz in 2017
- Born: 21 March 1981 (age 45); Moscow, Russian SFSR, Soviet Union
- Education: Łódź Film School
- Occupation: Actress
- Years active: 2003–present
- Children: 1

Weronika Książkiewicz (Polish pronunciation: [vɛ.rɔˈɲi.ka kɕɔw̃ʂˈkjɛ.vit͡ʂ]; born 21 March 1981) is a Polish actress. She is best known for playing Ola in the romantic comedy film Planet Single (2016) and Dzika in the crime drama film Furioza (2021).

== Early life ==
Książkiewicz was born in Moscow to Fyodor Levin, a Russian doctor, and Beata Książkiewicz, a Polish ballet dancer. She was initially raised by her grandmother in Poznań while her mother attended ballet school in Moscow. As a child, she trained in artistic gymnastics, synchronized swimming, and ballet. She attended XX Liceum Ogólnokształcące in Poznań and later graduated from the Łódź Film School in 2005.

== Career ==
Książkiewicz worked as an actress at the New Theatre in Łódź, Bagatela Theatre in Kraków and Teatr 6. piętro in Warsaw. In 2008, she participated in the second season of Gwiazdy tańczą na lodzie, the Polish version of Britain's Dancing on Ice. She was a guest judge during the sixth season of Top Model in 2016.

== Personal life ==
Książkiewicz has one child.

== Filmography ==
=== Film ===
| Year | Title | Role | Ref. |
|---|---|---|---|
| 2008 | Rozmowy nocą | Weronka | |
| 2008 | Little Moscow | Cemetery woman | |
| 2008 | Ile waży koń trojański? | Jola | |
| 2009 | Złoty środek | Kasia | |
| 2011 | Los numeros | Iwona | |
| 2013 | Podejrzani zakochani | Ludka | |
| 2014 | Dzień dobry, kocham cię! | Pati | |
| 2015 | Disco polo | Polak's secretary | |
| 2016 | Planet Single | Ola | |
| 2016 | Kobiety bez wstydu | Aneta | |
| 2018 | Planet Single 2 | Ola | |
| 2019 | Planet Single 3 | Ola | |
| 2020 | Mayday | Marysia Kowalska | |
| 2021 | Back to Those Days | Helena | |
| 2021 | Furioza | Ewa "Dzika" Drzewiecka | |
| 2022 | Miłość jest blisko | Natalia Milewska | |
| 2022 | Szczęścia chodzą parami | Malwina | |
| 2024 | Piep*zyc Mickiewicza | Irena | |
| 2024 | Kill Me If You Dare | Natalia | |
| 2025 | Piep*zyc Mickiewicza 2 | Irena | |
| 2025 | Planeta Singli 4: Wyspa | Ola | |
| 2025 | Inside Furioza | | |

=== Television ===
| Year | Title | Role | Notes | Ref. |
|---|---|---|---|---|
| 2003–2004 | Plebania | Ola | 9 episodes | |
| 2004 | Glina | Grzelak's neighbor | 2 episodes | |
| 2004 | Stacyjka | Iga Szulc | 13 episodes | |
| 2004 | Panienki | Anna | 3 episodes | |
| 2005 | Karol: A Man Who Became Pope | Mrs. Waechter | Television film | |
| 2005 | Talki z resztą | Marlena Krajewska | 1 episode | |
| 2005 | Lokatorzy | Małgorzata | 3 episodes | |
| 2005 | Wiedźmy | Styk's wife | 1 episode | |
| 2005 | Zakręcone | Anna | 15 episodes | |
| 2006 | Kopciuszek | Blonde | 1 episode | |
| 2006 | Oficerowie | Lawyer Wasowska | 1 episode | |
| 2006 | Crime Detectives | Kinga Tomaszko | 1 episode | |
| 2006 | Mrok | "Pussi" | 1 episode | |
| 2007 | 5 Dilemma Street | Nadia | 3 episodes | |
| 2007 | Prawo miasta | Jaga Sarnecka | 17 episodes | |
| 2008 | 39 and a Half | Actress | 1 episode | |
| 2008 | Pitbull | Ilona | 2 episodes | |
| 2008 | Niania | Miss Opole | 1 episode | |
| 2008 | BrzydUla | Klaudia | 1 episode | |
| 2008 | I kto tu rządzi? | Ewelina | 1 episode | |
| 2008 | The Londoners | Agnieszka | 1 episode | |
| 2009 | Rajskie klimaty | Marta Milorzebska | 1 episode | |
| 2009 | Teraz albo nigdy! | Alicja | 2 episodes | |
| 2009–2012 | Father Matthew | Izabela Janiszewska; Mariola Bogucka | 2 episodes | |
| 2010 | Hotel 52 | Sylwia Wilk | 1 episode | |
| 2011 | Linia życia | Nurse Patrycja Szostek | 1 episode | |
| 2011 | Instynkt | Aldona Pałys | 1 episode | |
| 2011 | Chichot losu | Agata | 6 episodes | |
| 2011 | Rezydencja | Julia Podhorecka | 1 episode | |
| 2012 | Piąty Stadion | Anna Nowakowska | 1 episode | |
| 2012 | Komisarz Alex | Joanna Hoffer | 1 episode | |
| 2014 | Medics | Sonia Karolak | 1 episode | |
| 2014 | Na krawędzi | Natalia Waxman | 4 episodes | |
| 2015 | True Law | Ewelina Ćwiklińska | 1 episode | |
| 2015 | Na dobre i na złe | Daria | 1 episode | |
| 2016 | Inspector Coliandro | Natasha | 1 episode | |
| 2016 | Komisja morderstw | Carmen | 1 episode | |
| 2016 | Na noże | Wiola Faryga | 13 episodes | |
| 2018 | Trzecia połowa | Ania | 1 episode | |
| 2018 | The Chairman's Ear | Mrs. Magda | Web series; 1 episode | |
| 2020–2021 | Lepsza połowa | Ania | 19 episodes | |
| 2018–2023 | Leśniczówka | Lidia Banach | 255 episodes | |
| 2022 | Furioza | Ewa "Dzika" Drzewiecka | Miniseries; 4 episodes | |
| 2022 | Herkules | Sylwia Mazur | 8 episodes | |
