= Nie daj się =

Single by Doda

from the album Diamond Bitch
- Released: August 2008 (Poland)
- Recorded: 2008
- Genre: Pop/Pop rock
- Length: 4:00 (album version)
- Label: Universal Music Poland
- Songwriters: Doda, Marek Koscikiewicz
- Producer: Marek Kościkiewicz

Doda singles chronology
"To jest to" (2007)	"Nie daj się" (2008)	"Rany" (2009)

Music video
- "Nie Daj Się" on YouTube

Doda in the music video for "Nie Daj Się" in English meaning Don't Give Up

"Nie daj się" is the third single released from Doda's first solo album, Diamond Bitch. It is a single from the re-issue of the album. The song became the biggest hit of her solo career, and won in the category Polish Summer Hit 2008 at the Sopot Hit Festival.

Doda performed the song live at the National Festival of Polish Song in Opole 2008, Sopot Top Trendy Festival 2008 and Sopot Hit Festival 2008. She also sang "Nie daj się" at the final concert of summer concert tour "Hity Na Czasie 2008" in Zabrze.

== Music video ==
The single's music video was directed by Anna Maliszewska, the script was written by Doda, and filming took place in Warsaw. The video premiered on 9 July 2008, on Plejada.pl.

== Accolades ==
Rok	Konkurs	Kategoria	Rezultat
2008	Sopot Hit Festiwal 2008	Polish Hit of Summer 2008	Winner
2008	VIVA Comet 2008	Charts Awards	Winner
2008	VIVA Comet 2008	Music Video of the Year	Winner
2008	Złote Dzioby	Hit of the Year	Nomination
2008	Złote Dzioby	Music video of the year	Winner
2009	Eska Music Awards	Video of the Year	Nomination
2009	Mikrofony Popcornu	Hit of the Year	3rd Place
2009	Świry	Hit of the Year	Nomination
2009	OGAE Video Contest 2009	Polish eliminations for the Video competition	Winner
2009	OGAE Video Contest 2009	Video Contest	8st Place
2010	Polski Hit Dekady	Pop song of the decade	Winner
2016	53. KFPP w Opolu	Audience Grand Prix	Nomination
