= Virgin (Virgin album) =

Studio album by Virgin
- Released: September 16, 2002
- Recorded: 2002
- Genres: Alternative rock, nu metal
- Label: Universal Music Poland

Virgin chronology
Virgin (2002)	Bimbo (2004)

Singles from Virgin
- 1. "To Ty" Released: 2002; 2. "Mam Tylko Ciebie" Released: 2002; 3. "Nie Złość Dody" Released: 2002

Virgin is the debut full-length by Polish rock band Virgin in 2002. It was then combined into a collection album, Virgin Box. The album managed to reach number 36 on the Polish OLiS charts.

== Track listing ==
1. "Dzieci Ziemi" ("Children of the Earth") - 3:40
2. "9 Życzeń" ("9 wishes") - 2:42
3. "To Ty" ("It's you") - 3:44
4. "Nie Złość Dody" ("Don't make Doda angry") - 3:37
5. "Nie Tak - Do Mnie Mówi Się!" ("It's not how one talks to me") - 3:29
6. "Nie Odpowiadaj" ("Don't answer") - 3:34
7. "Na Niby" ("Not for real") - 2:26
8. "Masz Jeszcze Czas" ("You still have time") - 2:54
9. "Czekam" ("I'm waiting") - 1:47
10. "Punkowy" ("Punk style") - 1:37
11. "Mam Tylko Ciebie" ("I have only you") - 3:18
12. "Sława - A za Co To?" ("Fame - for what?") - 2:54
13. "Material Girl" - 2:26
14. "Będę Dziś Szalona" ("Today I'll be crazy") - 3:01
15. "Sagan Ohm Warr" - 2:53
16. "To Ty" ("It's you") - 4:02
