= Bimbo (Virgin album) =

Studio album by Virgin
- Released: May 17, 2004
- Recorded: 2003
- Genre: Pop rock, alternative rock
- Label: Universal Music Poland

Virgin chronology
| Virgin (2002) | Bimbo (2004) | Ficca (2005) |

Singles from Bimbo
- 1. "Dżaga" Released: 2004; 2. "Kolejny Raz" Released: 2004; 3. "Nie Zawiedź Mnie" Released: 2004

Bimbo is the second album released by a Polish rock band Virgin. The album has earned golden record award in Poland. It was then combined into a collection album, Virgin Box.

== Track listing ==
1. "Szafa - 3:55 (Closet)
2. "Chłopczyku Mój" - 4:06 (My boy)
3. "Dżaga" - 4:05 (Hot girl)
4. "Nie Zawiedź Mnie" - 3:12 (Don't disappoint me)
5. "Nie Oceniać Jej" - 4:36 (Don't judge her)
6. "Et Anima" - 4:34
7. "Ulica" - 3:56 (Street)
8. "Piekarnia" - 3:15 (Bakery)
9. "Okno Boże" - 3:05 (God's Window)
10. "Teraz To Wiem" - 3:25 (Now I know it)
11. "Bar" - 3:31 (Pub)
12. "Kolejny Raz" - 3:25 (Another time )
13. "Mój "M"" - 2:59 (My M)
