= Ficca =

Studio album by Virgin
- Released: October 24, 2005
- Recorded: 2005
- Genre: Pop rock, alternative rock
- Length: 38:25
- Label: Universal Music Poland

Virgin chronology
Bimbo (2004)	Ficca (2005)	Choni (2016)

Singles from Ficca
- 1. "Znak Pokoju" Released: 2005; 2. "2 Bajki" Released: 2005; 3. "Szansa" Released: 2006

Ficca (English: "Boss of all bosses") is the third album released by a Polish rock band Virgin. The album has earned a triple platinum certification in Poland with sales of over 100,000 units.

"Znak Pokoju" (English: "Sign of Peace") was the first single released from the album. The song was the biggest hit of 2005 and was at the top of Polish charts. It won the Srebrny Słowik on the Sopot Festival.

The album was re-released in June 2006 as a part of the collection album, Virgin Box.

== Track listing ==
1. "Inni Przyjaciele" (Other friends)
2. "Dezyda"
3. "Opowiem Ci" (I'll tell you)
4. "Superstar"
5. "Znak Pokoju" (Peace sign)
6. "Mam Wszystko W..." (I don't give a...)
7. "2 Bajki" (Two fairy tales)
8. "In Love"
9. "Piosenka na Imprezę" (Party song)
10. "Dla R. (Nieważne dziś jest)" (For R. – Today doesn't matter)
11. "Mam Tylko Ciebie" (wersja live) (I have only you – live version)

== Ficca re-edition ==
Ficca

Studio album by Virgin
- Released: June 16, 2006
- Genre: Pop rock, alternative rock
- Length: 54:01
- Label: Universal Music Poland

Singles from Ficca
- 1. "Szansa" Released: 2006

=== Track listing ===
1. "Szansa"
2. "Inni Przyjaciele"
3. "Dezyda"
4. "Opowiem Ci"
5. "Superstar"
6. "Znak Pokoju"
7. "Mam wszystko w..."
8. "2 Bajki"
9. "In Love"
10. "Piosenka na imprezę"
11. "Dla R. (Nieważne dziś jest)"
12. "Mam Tylko Ciebie" (live version)
13. "Nie Zawiedź Mnie" (live version)
14. "Znak Pokoju" (karaoke version)
15. "Szansa" (karaoke version)

== Charts and certifications ==
=== Charts ===
Chart (2006)	Peak position
Polish Albums (ZPAV)	1

=== Certifications ===
Region	Certification	Certified units/sales
Poland (ZPAV)	3× Platinum	90,000^{‡}
^{‡} Sales+streaming figures based on certification alone.
