= List of songs recorded by Margaret =

Songs recorded by Margaret

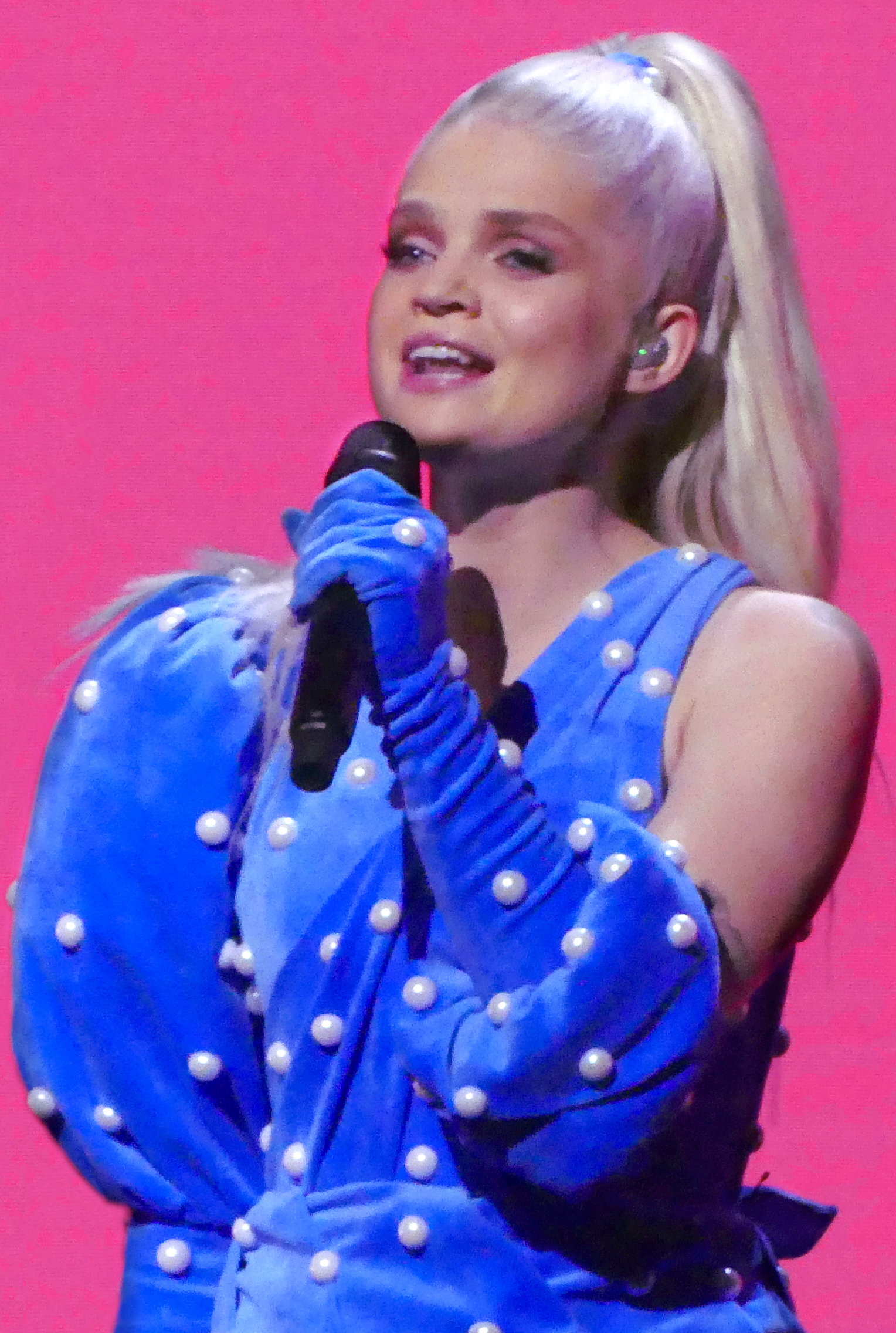
Margaret during her Melodifestivalen 2019 semi-final performance

Polish singer and songwriter Margaret has recorded songs for six studio albums, one live album and five extended plays (EPs), and made several guest appearances on other artists' releases. Majority of her earlier work is in English, which she attributed partly to the fact that her songs sound better when sung in that language. Before her mainstream debut, she recorded songs for television commercials, and released an independent album with her band Margaret J. Project called This Is Margaret (2012).

Margaret was signed by Extensive Music in 2012, and released her first EP All I Need the following year. The EP consisted of six songs and featured her debut single "Thank You Very Much". All the songs from All I Need were later included on her debut studio album Add the Blonde released in 2014. Margaret co-wrote four songs, including the album's third single "Heartbeat". Add the Blonde was reissued in 2016 and contained new songs "Cool Me Down" and "Elephant", as well as Margaret's Polish-language version of Robin Beck's song "First Time" titled "Smak radości" which was used in Poland's 2015 Coca-Cola commercial.

Margaret's second studio album Just the Two of Us (2015), recorded in collaboration with Matt Dusk, consisted of jazz standards. Her third studio album, Monkey Business, was released in 2017. It contained her first two original Polish-language songs, "Byle jak" and "Nie chcę". A majority of the record was co-written by Margaret. She co-wrote every track on her first Polish-language album, Gaja Hornby (2019), which featured collaborations with Kacezet and Gverilla. Similarly, she co-wrote every track on its follow-up, Maggie Vision (2021), which saw her delve into hip hop. On her 2024 synth-pop sixth studio album, Siniaki i cekiny, she worked primarily with Kacezet, Bhavik Pattani and Ryan Bickley.

== Songs ==
Key
†	Indicates single release
‡	Indicates songs co-written by Margaret

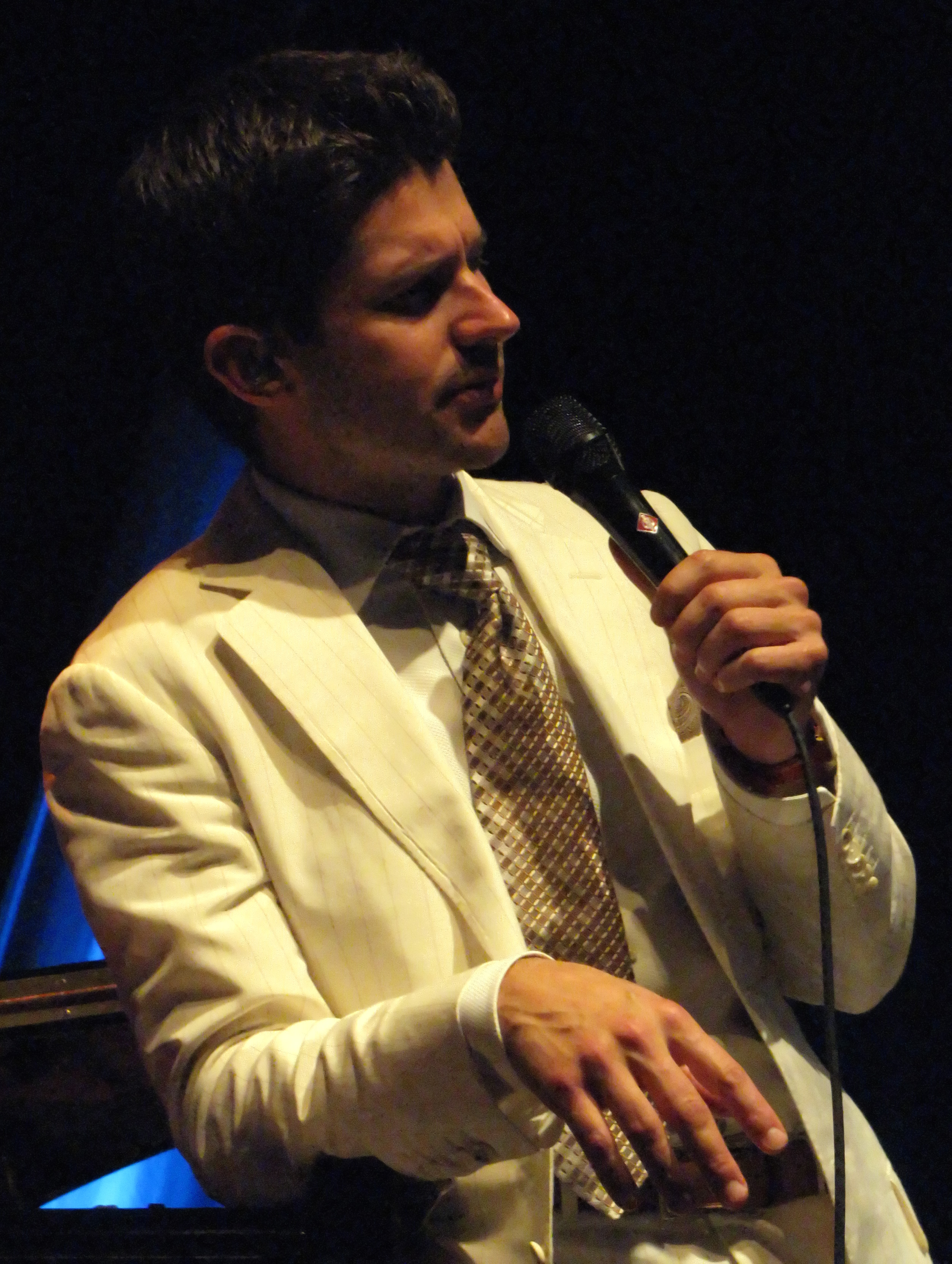
Matt Dusk collaborated with Margaret on the jazz album Just the Two of Us, and the song "Let It Snow!" for his album Old School Yule!.

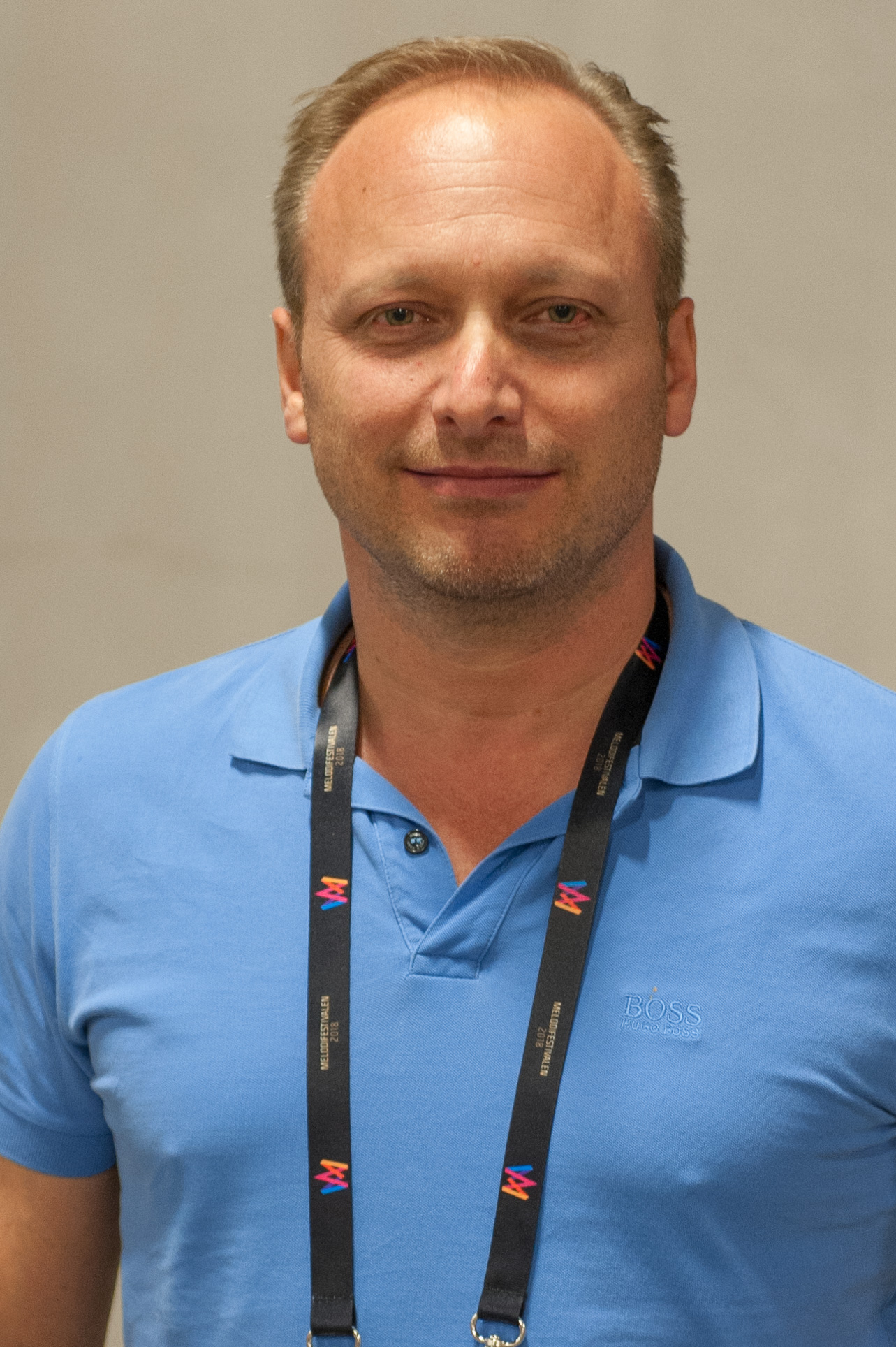
Robert Uhlmann was one of Margaret's regular collaborators in the first decade of her career. He co-wrote "Wasted", "Cool Me Down", "What You Do" and "In My Cabana".

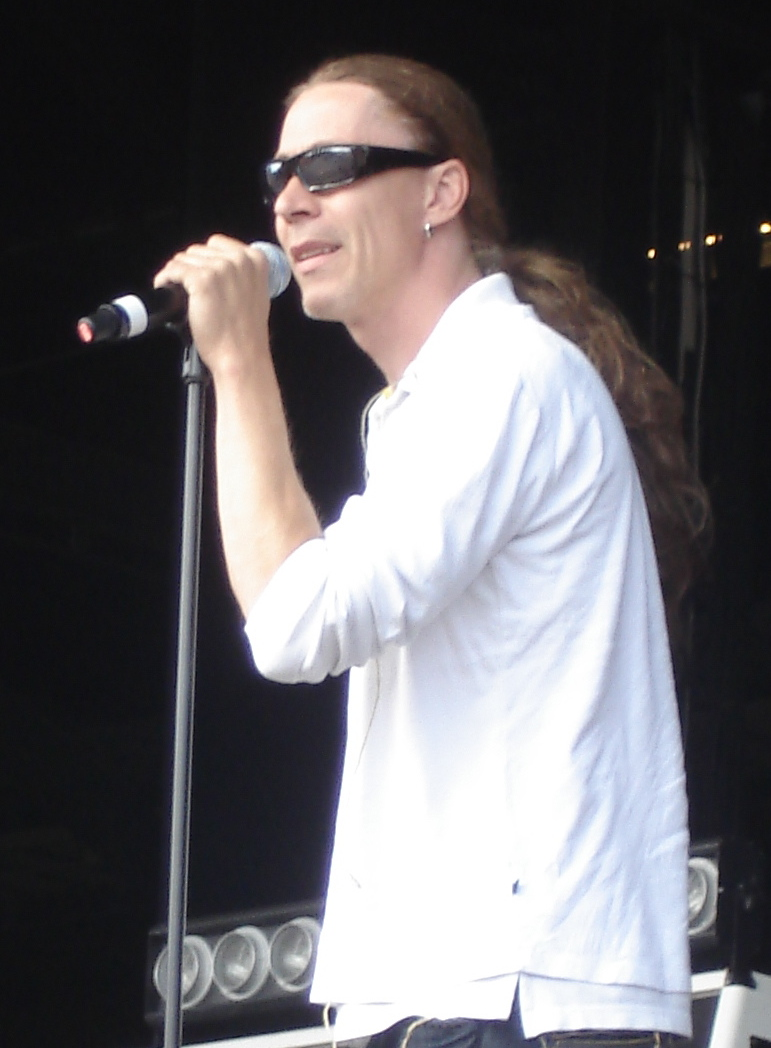
Martin Eriksson co-wrote five songs for Margaret's debut studio album Add the Blonde.

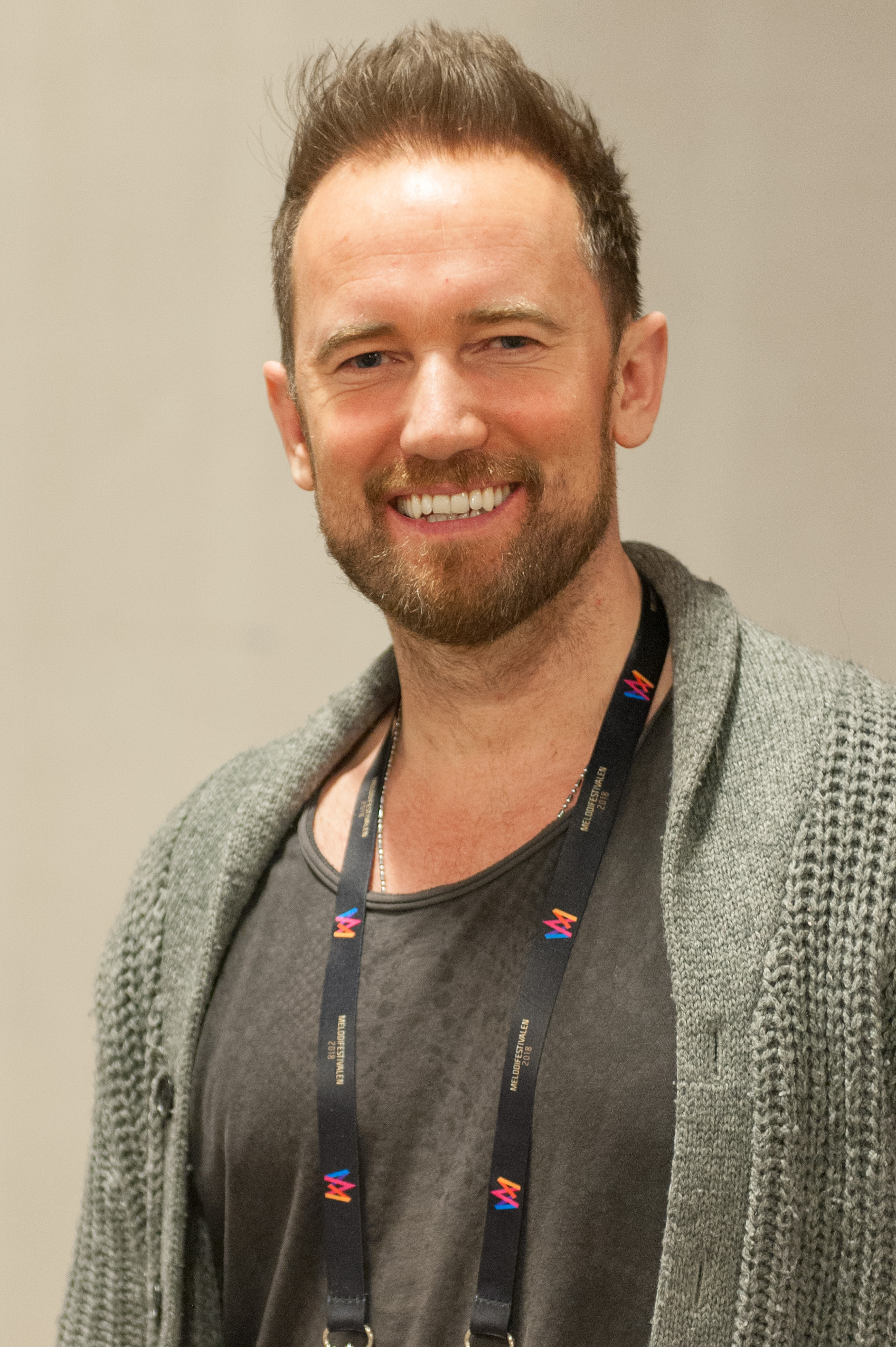
Anderz Wrethov co-wrote "Cool Me Down", "What You Do", "In My Cabana" and "Tempo".

Song	Artist(s)	Writer(s)	Release(s)	Year	Ref.
"6 in the Morning" †	VAX featuring Margaret	Alex Papaconstantinou; Ameerah Roelants; Johnny Powers Severin; Teddy Sky; Viktor Svensson	Non-album single	2017	
"A kto wie czy za rogiem"	Margaret and Siemacha Choir	Maciej Zieliński; Bozenna Intrator	Gwiazdy po kolędzie	2015	
"All I Need"	Margaret	Thomas Karlsson; Katy Rose; Joakim Buddee; Martin Eriksson	All I Need; Add the Blonde	2013	
"Antipop" †	Margaret featuring Kara	Małgorzata Jamroży ‡; Piotr Kozieradzki; Karolina Słowik	Maggie Vision	2021	
"As Good as You"	Margaret	Katy Rose; Joakim Buddee	Add the Blonde	2014	
"Atomówki"	Margaret	Tacocat (Note: "Atomówki" is a Polish-language version of the song "Who's Got the Power?" written and originally performed by Tacocat. The author of the Polish lyrics is unknown.)	The Powerpuff Girls (television series) (Note: Polish-language version.)	2016	
"Bajkał" †	1988 featuring Kacha and Margaret	1988; Kacha; Margaret ‡	Ruleta	2021	
"Bla bla bla"	Margaret with Sara James and Zalia as part of Babie Lato	James Carter; Johannes Shore; Julia Zarzecka; Małgorzata Jamroży ‡; Naitumela Masuku; Piotr Kozieradzki; Sara James; Tom Martin	Babie Lato 2025	2025	
"Blue Vibes" †	Margaret	Joakim Buddee; Ingrid Hägglund; Dimitri Stassos; Margaret ‡	Smurfs: The Lost Village (film); Monkey Business	2017	
"Błogość" †	Kacezet featuring Margaret	Jan Szarecki; Marek Walaszek; Piotr Kozieradzki	Non-album single	2019	
"Błyski fleszy, plotki, ścianki"	Margaret	Małgorzata Jamroży ‡; Piotr Kozieradzki; Mikołaj Trybulec; Marek Walaszek	Gaja Hornby	2019	
"Błyszczę" †	Margaret with Brodka and Rosalie. as part of Babie Lato	Małgorzata Jamroży; Monika Brodka; Przemysław Jankowiak; Rosalie Hoffman	Non-album single	2024	
"Broke but Happy"	Margaret	Thomas Karlsson; Joakim Buddee	Add the Blonde	2014	
"Byle jak" †	Margaret	Emil Gullhamn; Sebastian Hallifax; Dimitri Stassos; Margaret ‡	Monkey Business (deluxe edition)	2017	
"Byle jak (Live)" †	Margaret	Dimitri Stassos; Emil Gullhamn; Małgorzata Jamroży ‡; Sebastian Hallifax	MTV Unplugged Margaret	2023	
"Bynajmniej" †	Margaret	Bhavik Pattani; Kacezet; Margaret ‡; Ryan Bickley	Siniaki i cekiny	2023	
"Całe szczęście"	Margaret	Paweł Lucewicz; Gverilla	Całe szczęście (film)	2019	
"CandyFlip" †	RIP Scotty and Leeo featuring Margaret	RIP Scotty; Leeo; Małgorzata Jamroży ‡; Piotr Kozieradzki	Borderline	2021	
"Candy flip"	Margaret with Dziarma and Young Leosia as part of club2020	Agata Dziarmagowska; Jakub Kuśpiel; Małgorzata Jamroży ‡; Piotr Suwalski; Sara Sudoł	club2020	2023	
"Catch Me If You Can"	Margaret	Bhavik Pattani; Kacezet; Margaret ‡; Ryan Bickley	Siniaki i cekiny	2024	
"Chwile bez słów" †	Margaret featuring Kacezet	Małgorzata Jamroży ‡; Piotr Kozieradzki; Mikołaj Trybulec; Jan Szarecki; Mateusz Kochaniec	Gaja Hornby	2019	
"Click"	Margaret	Thomas Karlsson; Joakim Buddee; Lovisa Birgersson; Martin Eriksson	All I Need; Add the Blonde	2013	
"Color of You"	Margaret featuring Tape Machines	Simon Gribbe; Fredrik Jansson; Thomas Karlsson; Margaret ‡	Monkey Business	2017	
"Cool Me Down" †	Margaret	Robert Uhlmann; Arash; Alex Papaconstantinou; Anderz Wrethov; Viktor Svensson; Linnea Deb	Add the Blonde (reissue)	2016	
"Cool Me Down (Live)"	Margaret	Alex Arash Labaf; Alex Papaconstantinou; Anderz Wrethov; Linnea Deb; Robert Uhlmann; Viktor Svensson	MTV Unplugged Margaret	2023	
"Coraz bliżej święta" †	Margaret featuring The Voice of Poland 6 finalists	Ewelina Kordy; Joanna Senieka; Richard Airis; Scott Temper	Non-album singles	2015	
"Coraz bliżej święta (2025)" †	Margaret	Ewelina Kordy; Joanna Senieka; Richard Airis; Scott Temper	Non-album singles	2025	
"Co w planch"	Margaret featuring Kacezet	Bhavik Pattani; Kacezet; Margaret ‡	Tripolar	2026	
"Co za noc" †	Margaret with Sara James and Zalia as part of Babie Lato	Amanda Kongshaug; Bhavik Pattani; Julia Zarzecka; Małgorzata Jamroży ‡; Piotr Kozieradzki; Sara James	Babie Lato 2025	2025	
"Cry in My Gucci" †	Margaret	Bhavik Pattani; Ilira Gashi; Jaro Omar	Non-album singles	2022	
"Cudowne lata" †	Margaret with Natalia Kukulska, Mery Spolsky, Bovska and Zalia as part of Babie Lato	Archie Shevsky; Natalia Kukulska	Non-album singles	2023	
"Cute" †	Viki Gabor featuring Margaret	Kacezet; Leeo; Wiktoria Gabor; Margaret ‡	ID	2022	
"Cuz It's You"	Margaret	Joakim Buddee; Thomas Karlsson; Margaret ‡	Monkey Business	2017	
"Cypher2022" †	Margaret with Taco Hemingway, Oki, Otsochodzi, Young Igi, Łajzol, Gruby Mielzky, Hałastra, Kukon, Dwa Sławy, Young Leosia, CatchUp, Schafter, Dziarma, Szczyl and Miły ATZ as part of club2020	Adam Wiśniewski; Agata Dziarmagowska; Dominik Kwiatkowski; Filip Szcześniak; Grzegorz Szczerek; Igor Ośmiałowski; Jakub Dąbrowski; Jakub Konopka; Jarek Steciuk; Małgorzata Jamroży ‡; Miłosz Stępień; Miłosz Szymkowiak; Oskar Kamiński; Paweł Bartnik; Radek Średziński; Sara Sudoł; Tomasz Mielewski; Tymoteusz Rożynek; Wojciech Laskowski	club2020	2023	
"Czuję miętę" (Note: "Czuję miętę" is a Polish-language cover of Rosalía's song "Malamente".)	Margaret	Rosalía Vila; Pablo Díaz-Reixa; Antón Álvarez Alfaro; Gverilla (Note: Gverilla wrote Polish lyrics for Margaret's version of the song.)	Non-album songs	2019	
"Daenerys & Jon Snow"	Margaret and Kacezet	Margaret ‡; Kacezet	Non-album songs	2019	
"Daj k***** miodu"	Margaret with Dwa Sławy and Pers as part of club2020	Dominik Gomez; Jarek Steciuk; Marcel Kowalski; Małgorzata Jamroży ‡; Radek Średziński	club2020 Mixtape	2023	
"Dalej biegnę" †	Margaret	Bhavik Pattionki; Margaret ‡; Kacezet	Siniaki i cekiny	2023	
"Daleka północ"	Margaret	Bhavik Pattani; Kacezet; Margaret ‡	Siniaki i cekiny	2024	
"Dance for 2"	Margaret	Margaret ‡; Thomas Karlsson; Joakim Buddee	Add the Blonde	2014	
"Dance Stupid"	Margaret	Bhavik Pattani; Kacezet; Margaret ‡; Ryan Bickley	Siniaki i cekiny ciąg dalszy	2024	
"'Deed I Do" † (Note: An acoustic version of the song was included on the limited edition of Just the Two of Us.)	Matt Dusk and Margaret	Fred Rose; Walter Hirsch	Just the Two of Us	2015	
"Deszcz" †	Margaret with Otsochodzi, Taco Hemingway, Schafter, CatchUp, Dwa Sławy and Gruby Mielzky as part of club2020	Filip Szcześniak; Grzegorz Blachowski; Grzegorz Szczerek; Jarek Steciuk; Konrad Żyrek; Małgorzata Jamroży ‡; Miłosz Stępień; Radek Średziński; Wojciech Laskowski	club2020	2023	
"Doby hotelowe"	Margaret with Sara James and Zalia as part of Babie Lato	Julia Zarzecka; Małgorzata Jamroży ‡; Piotr Kozieradzki; Sara James	Babie Lato 2025	2025	
"DPD"	Margaret featuring Julia Pośnik	Jan Szarecki; Julia Pośnik; Kacezet; Margaret ‡; urboishawty	Urbano Futuro	2023	
"Ej chłopaku" †	Margaret	Małgorzata Jamroży ‡; Piotr Kozieradzki; Mateusz Kochaniec; Dominic Buczkowski	Gaja Hornby	2019	
"Ej chłopaku (Live)"	Margaret	Dominic Buczkowski-Wojtaszek; Małgorzata Jamroży ‡; Mateusz Kochaniec; Piotr Kozieradzki	MTV Unplugged Margaret	2023	
"Elephant" †	Margaret	Margaret ‡; Joakim Buddee; Thomas Karlsson	Add the Blonde (reissue)	2016	
"Fotel" †	Margaret	Małgorzata Jamroży ‡; Piotr Kozieradzki; Jan Szarecki	Maggie Vision	2020	
"FourFiveSeconds"	Margaret featuring Sound'n'Grace and Wojciech Miecznikowski	Kanye West; Paul McCartney; Kirby Lauren; Mike Dean; Ty Dolla Sign; Dave Longstreth; Robyn Fenty; Dallas Austin; Elon Rutberg; Noah Goldstein	Non-album song	2015	
"Funky Song"	Margaret	Thomas Karlsson; Margaret ‡; Paulo Mendonça	Monkey Business	2017	
"Future Me Problem"	Margaret	Thomas Karlsson; Jenny Langlo; Molly Pettersson Hammar; Lorenz Schimpf	Monkey Business	2017	
"Gaja Hornby" †	Margaret	Małgorzata Jamroży ‡; Piotr Kozieradzki; Mikołaj Trybulec; Mariusz Obijalski	Gaja Hornby	2019	
"Gdy się Chrystus rodzi"	Margaret with Rafał Brzozowski, Kasia Popowska, Sarsa, Siemacha Choir, Antek Smykiewicz and Pamela Stone	Unknown	Gwiazdy po kolędzie	2015	
"Gee, Baby, Ain't I Good to You"	Matt Dusk and Margaret	Don Redman; Andy Razaf	Just the Two of Us	2015	
"Gelato" †	Margaret featuring Tymek	Małgorzata Jamroży ‡; Piotr Kozieradzki; Łukasz Rozmysłowski; Katarzyna Kowalczyk; Tymoteusz Brucki	Gelato	2021	
"Get Away"	Margaret	Margaret ‡; Olga Czyżykiewicz; Thomas Karlsson; Joakim Buddee; Martin Eriksson	All I Need; Add the Blonde	2013	
"Girl from Ipanema"	Matt Dusk and Margaret	Antônio Carlos Jobim; Vinicius de Moraes; Norman Gimbel	Just the Two of Us	2015	
"Glorious"	Margaret	Joakim Buddee; Josefin Glenmark; Thomas Karlsson; Margaret ‡	Monkey Business	2017	
"Goń" †	Miętha featuring Margaret	AWGS; Margaret ‡; Skip	Mięthlik	2023	
"Have Yourself a Merry Little Christmas"	Margaret	Hugh Martin; Ralph Blane	Non-album song	2014	
"Headspace"	Margaret	Kaiya Campbell; Luke Jackson; Margaret ‡; Tobi Verheij	Voice; Tripolar	2026	
"Heartbeat" †	Margaret	Margaret ‡; Joakim Buddee	Add the Blonde	2014	
"Hood Love (a ja nie)" †	Pedro, Francis and Beteo featuring Margaret	Adrian Połoński; Małgorzata Jamroży ‡; Mikołaj Vargas; Szymon Frąckowiak	Palma na blokach (deluxe edition)	2022	
"Hot Like Summer AGP" †	Margaret and Álvaro Soler	Álvaro Soler; Bhavik Pattani; Kacezet; Margaret ‡; Ryan Bickley	Siniaki i cekiny (digital)	2024	
"Hot Like Summer WAW" †	Margaret and Álvaro Soler	Álvaro Soler; Bhavik Pattani; Kacezet; Margaret ‡; Ryan Bickley	Siniaki i cekiny	2024	
"How Insensitive"	Matt Dusk and Margaret	Antônio Carlos Jobim; Norman Gimbel	Just the Two of Us	2015	
"I Get Along"	Margaret	Thomas Karlsson; Martin Eriksson; Joakim Buddee	All I Need; Add the Blonde	2013	
"I Got It Bad (and That Ain't Good)"	Margaret	Duke Ellington; Paul Francis Webster	Just the Two of Us	2015	
"In My Cabana" †	Margaret	Anderz Wrethov; Arash Labaf; Linnea Deb; Robert Uhlmann	Melodifestivalen 2018	2018	
"In My Cabana (Live)"	Margaret	Alex Arash Labaf; Anderz Wrethov; Linnea Deb; Robert Uhlmann	MTV Unplugged Margaret	2023	
"Introwersje"	Margaret featuring Stanislavv	Małgorzata Jamroży ‡; Piotr Kozieradzki; Stanisław Ślężak	Maggie Vision	2021	
"It Will Be Lovely Day"	Margaret (Note: Credited as Małgorzata Jamroży.)	Paweł Lucewicz; Jacek Lusiński	Non-album song	2012	
"Jetlag"	Margaret featuring Kizo	Bhavik Pattani; Margaret ‡; Piotr Kozieradzki; Kizo	Body; Tripolar	2026	
"Just the Two of Us" †	Matt Dusk and Margaret	Bill Withers; Ralph MacDonald; William Salter	Just the Two of Us	2015	
"Kicia" †	Margaret	Bhavik Pattani; Małgorzata Jamroży ‡; Piotr Kozieradzki	Non-album single	2025	
"Kiedy jak nie teraz"	Margaret	Małgorzata Jamroży ‡; Piotr Kozieradzki; Mikołaj Jędrzejewski	Gelato	2021	
"Kłopoty" †	Margaret, Hanafi, Hubi and Adash	Adam Kamiński; Hubert Poliński; Małgorzata Jamroży ‡; Tomasz Hanafi	Non-album singles	2025	
"Kocha" †	Urboishawty featuring Kacezet and Margaret	Małgorzata Jamroży ‡; Mikołaj Jędrzejewski; Piotr Kozieradzki	Non-album singles	2021	
"Kolęda warszawska 1939"	Margaret	Stanisław Baliński; Zbigniew Preisner	Non-album song	2015	
"Kolizja"	Margaret	Jan Szarecki; Kacezet; Margaret ‡	Siniaki i cekiny ciąg dalszy	2024	
"Komu czemu"	Margaret	Margaret ‡; Piotr Kozieradzki	Body; Tripolar	2026	
"Koniec"	Paulina Przybysz featuring Margaret	Paulina Przybysz; Małgorzata Jamroży ‡; Paweł Stachowiak	Wracając	2023	
"Last Call"	Margaret	Amanda Kongshaug; Bhavik Pattani; Kacezet; Margaret ‡	Siniaki i cekiny ciąg dalszy	2024	
"Late Night Show"	Margaret with Oki, Dwa Sławy and Schafter as part of club2020	Adam Wiśniewski; Jarek Steciuk; Małgorzata Jamroży ‡; Oskar Kamiński; Radek Średziński; Wojciech Laskowski	club2020	2023	
"Let It Snow!" †	Matt Dusk featuring Margaret	Jule Styne; Sammy Cahn	Old School Yule!	2016	
"Let It Snow!"	Margaret and Grzegorz Hyży	Jule Styne; Sammy Cahn	Non-album song	2019	
"Let You Talk About It" †	Margaret	Francois Le Goffic; Mike Lowrey; William Kristensen; Margaret ‡	Body; Tripolar	2026	
"List do starych" †	Margaret	Bhavik Pattani; Kacezet; Margaret ‡	Tripolar	2026	
"L.O.L."	Margaret	Mattias Olofsson; Joakim Buddee	Add the Blonde	2014	
"Lollipop" †	Margaret	Alex P; Arash Labaf; Claydee; Linnea Deb; Victory	Non-album singles	2018	
"Mała ja" †	Margaret	Bhavik Pattani; Kacezet; Margaret ‡	Siniaki i cekiny	2024	
"Mamona" †	Margaret and Włodi	Grzegorz Ciechowski; Zbigniew Krzywański; Konrad Biliński; Małgorzata Jamroży ‡; Paweł Włodkowski; Przemysław Wałczuk	Non-album single	2022	
"Mamy farta" †	Margaret featuring Pezet	Amanda Kongshaug; Bhavik Pattani; Kacezet; Margaret ‡; Pezet	Siniaki i cekiny ciąg dalszy	2024	
"Margarita" †	Margaret	Bhavik Pattani; Kacezet; Margaret ‡; Ryan Bickley	Siniaki i cekiny	2024	
"Medicine"	Margaret	Bhavik Pattani; Jaro Omar; Margaret ‡	Siniaki i cekiny	2024	
"Memory of Love"	Margaret	Bhavik Pattani; Kacezet; Margaret ‡; Ryan Bickley	Siniaki i cekiny	2024	
"Miłego lata" †	Margaret	Jan Szarecki; Kacezet; Margaret ‡	Siniaki i cekiny	2024	
"Mimo burz"	Margaret and Kacezet	Małgorzata Jamroży ‡; Mikołaj Jędrzejewski; Piotr Kozieradzki	Non-album songs	2022	
"Mizerna cicha"	Margaret and Kuba Badach	Teofil Lenartowicz; Jan Gall	Non-album songs	2016	
"Mniejsza o to" †	Margaret featuring Waima	Anja Pham; Kacezet; Leeo; Margaret ‡; Waima	Urbano Futuro	2023	
"Mogłeś tu być" †	Margaret	Bas Wissink; Freddie Dickson; Margaret ‡; Owen Vos; Kacezet	Voice; Tripolar	2026	
"Moments"	Margaret and Otar Saralidze	Paweł Lucewicz; Michał Gajewski	Non-album song	2011	
"Monkey Business"	Margaret	Joakim Buddee; Thomas Karlsson; Margaret ‡	Monkey Business	2017	
"Może zaczniemy w święta" †	Margaret	Bhavik Pattani; Małgorzata Jamroży ‡; Piotr Kozieradzki	Non-album single	2023	
"Najwyżej zmoknę"	Margaret	Kacezet; Margaret ‡	Tripolar	2026	
"Nie chcę"	Margaret featuring Marcin Januszkiewicz	Marcin Januszkiewicz; Andrzej Perkman	Monkey Business (deluxe edition)	2017	
"Nie dowiem się"	Gruby Mielzky and the Returners featuring Margaret	Tomasz Mielewski; Małgorzata Jamroży ‡; Michał Chwiałkowski; Michał Harmaciński	To się więcej nie powtórzy	2025	
"Niespokojne morze" †	Margaret	Małgorzata Jamroży ‡; Piotr Kozieradzki	Siniaki i cekiny	2022	
"Niespokojne morze (Live)"	Margaret	Małgorzata Jamroży ‡; Mateusz Tomaszewski; Piotr Kozieradzki	MTV Unplugged Margaret	2023	
"No Future" †	Margaret featuring Kukon	Małgorzata Jamroży ‡; Piotr Kozieradzki; Jan Szarecki; Jakub Konopka	Maggie Vision	2020	
"Nowe Plemię" †	Margaret	Małgorzata Jamroży ‡; Piotr Kozieradzki; Jan Szarecki	Maggie Vision	2020	
"Numer" (Mr. Krime Remix)	Rasmentalism featuring Dawid Podsiadło, Vito Bambino and Margaret	Wojciech Długosz; Arkadiusz Sitarz; Dawid Podsiadło; Małgorzata Jamroży ‡; Mateusz Dopieralski	Geniusz (deluxe edition)	2021	
"O mnie się nie martw" †	Margaret	Józef Krzeczek; Kazimierz Winkler	O mnie się nie martw (television series)	2014	
"Ostatnia prosta"	Margaret	Kacezet; Kuba Galiński; Margaret ‡	Tripolar	2026	
"Our Love Is Here to Stay"	Matt Dusk and Margaret	George Gershwin; Ira Gershwin	Just the Two of Us	2015	
"Oversize" †	Anja Pham featuring Margaret and Kacezet	Anja Pham; Małgorzata Jamroży ‡; Mikołaj Jędrzejewski; Piotr Kozieradzki	Non-album single	2022	
"Over You"	Margaret	Joakim Buddee; Thomas Karlsson; Margaret ‡	Monkey Business	2017	
"Piniata"	Margaret	Małgorzata Jamroży ‡; Piotr Kozieradzki; Bartek Czajka; Krzysztof Nowakowski	Maggie Vision	2021	
"Plot Twist"	Margaret	Margaret ‡; Piotr Kozieradzki	Body; Tripolar	2026	
"Początek" †	Margaret featuring Janusz Walczuk	@atutowy; Jan Szarecki; Janusz Walczuk; Kacezet; Margaret ‡	Urbano Futuro	2023	
"Pod choinką" †	Team X featuring Margaret	Małgorzata Jamroży ‡; Piotr Kozieradzki	Non-album single	2021	
"Pójdźmy wszyscy do stajenki"	Margaret with Rafał Brzozowski, Kasia Ignatowicz, Marcin Kindla, Adi Kowalski, Natali, Maria Niklińska, Kasia Popowska, Marta "Sarsa" Markiewicz, Honorata Skarbek, Siemacha Choir, Marcin Spenner, Pamela Stone and Jakub Szwast	Unknown	Siemacha po kolędzie	2014	
"Połamane skrzydła" †	Margaret	Bhavik Pattani; Jaro Omar; Kacezet; Margaret ‡	Tripolar	2026	
"Później ci opowiem" †	Dawid Kwiatkowski and Margaret	Dawid Kwiatkowski; Dominic Buczkowski-Wojtaszek; Małgorzata Jamroży ‡; Patryk Kumór	Południe; Voice; Tripolar	2026	
"Primabalerina" †	Margaret	Filippo Bonamici; Gerrit Arnold; Małgorzata Jamroży ‡; Piotr Kozieradzki	Voice; Tripolar	2026	
"Przebiśniegi" †	Margaret	Małgorzata Jamroży ‡; Piotr Kozieradzki; Jan Szarecki	Maggie Vision	2020	
"Psia mać"	Margaret	Małgorzata Jamroży ‡; Piotr Kozieradzki; Jan Szarecki	Gaja Hornby	2019	
"Pure Fun"	Margaret featuring Young Igi	Małgorzata Jamroży ‡; Piotr Kozieradzki; Igor Ośmiałowski	Maggie Vision	2021	
"Que Pasa"	1988 featuring Margaret, Tymek and Kacezet	1988; Kacezet; Margaret ‡; Tymek	Ruleta Hardcore	2022	
"Quiet Nights of Quiet Stars"	Matt Dusk and Margaret	Antônio Carlos Jobim; Gene Lees	Just the Two of Us	2015	
"Reksiu" †	Margaret featuring Otsochodzi	Małgorzata Jamroży ‡; Piotr Kozieradzki; Jan Szarecki; Eryk Sobus; Miłosz Stępień	Maggie Vision	2020	
"Reksiu (Live)" †	Margaret featuring Otsochodzi	Bartosz Czajka; Eryk Sobus; Małgorzata Jamroży ‡; Miłosz Stępień; Piotr Kozieradzki	MTV Unplugged Margaret	2023	
"Risk It All"	Margaret	Bhavik Pattani; Kacezet; Margaret ‡; Ryan Bickley	Siniaki i cekiny	2024	
"Roadster" †	Margaret featuring Kizo	Małgorzata Jamroży ‡; Piotr Kozieradzki; Patryk Woziński	Maggie Vision	2020	
"Roadster (Live)"	Margaret	Małgorzata Jamroży ‡; Patryk Woziński; Piotr Kozieradzki	MTV Unplugged Margaret	2023	
"Róża"	Margaret	Kacezet; Margaret ‡; Mathias Jan Mat	Voice; Tripolar	2026	
"Sad Clown"	Margaret	Bhavik Pattani; Margaret ‡; Ryan Bickley	Siniaki i cekiny	2024	
"Santa Claus Is Coming to Town"	Margaret and Pamela Stone	John Frederick Coots; Haven Gillespie	Siemacha po kolędzie	2014	
"Say No More"	Margaret featuring Urboishawty	Małgorzata Jamroży ‡; Piotr Kozieradzki; Bartek Czajka; Eryk Sobus; Mikołaj Jędrzejewski	Maggie Vision	2021	
"Serce Baila" †	Margaret	Małgorzata Jamroży ‡; Piotr Kozieradzki; Jan Szarecki	Gaja Hornby	2019	
"Serce Baila / Heartbeat (Live)"	Margaret	Jan Szarecki; Joakim Buddee; Linnea Gustafsson; Małgorzata Jamroży ‡; Piotr Kozieradzki	MTV Unplugged Margaret	2023	
"Showbiznes"	Janusz Walczuk featuring Margaret	Bartosz Worek; Jan Walczuk; Małgorzata Jamroży ‡; Norbert Drozd	Jan Walczuk	2023	
"Smak radości" †	Margaret	Tom Anthony; Gavin Spencer; Terry Boyle; Ewelina Kordy; Joanna Senieka	Add the Blonde (reissue)	2015	
"Sold Out" †	Margaret featuring Natalia Szroeder	Małgorzata Jamroży ‡; Piotr Kozieradzki; Bhavik Pattani; Natalia Szroeder	Maggie Vision	2021	
"Something Stupid"	Matt Dusk and Margaret	C. Carson Parks	Just the Two of Us	2015	
"SOS"	Margaret with Sara James and Zalia as part of Babie Lato	Amanda Kongshaug; Bhavik Pattani; Julia Zarzecka; Małgorzata Jamroży ‡; Piotr Kozieradzki; Sara James	Babie Lato 2025	2025	
"Start a Fire" (album version) †	Margaret	Thomas Karlsson; Mats Tärnfors	Add the Blonde	2014	
"Start a Fire" (2014 FIVB Volleyball Men's World Championship version)	Margaret	Thomas Karlsson; Mats Tärnfors; Margaret (Note: Margaret wrote Polish verse included in this version of the song.) ‡	Non-album song	2014	
"Strangers"	Margaret	Bhavik Pattani; Margaret ‡; Ryan Bickley	Siniaki i cekiny	2024	
"Super Human"	Margaret	Joakim Buddee; Margaret ‡; Thomas Karlsson	Monkey Business	2017	
"Światło"	Margaret	Małgorzata Jamroży ‡; Piotr Kozieradzki; Mikołaj Trybulec; Mateusz Kochaniec	Gaja Hornby	2019	
"Tak musiało być" †	Margaret	Jan Szarecki; Kacezet; Margaret ‡	Siniaki i cekiny ciąg dalszy	2024	
"Tak na oko" †	Margaret	Małgorzata Jamroży ‡; Piotr Kozieradzki	Gelato	2021	
"Tak na oko (Live)"	Margaret	Małgorzata Jamroży ‡; Mattia Rosinski; Piotr Kozieradzki	MTV Unplugged Margaret	2023	
"Tańcz głupia" †	Margaret	Bhavik Pattionki; Margaret ‡; Kacezet	Siniaki i cekiny	2023	
"Tattoo" † (Note: "Tattoo" was released as part of Spotify Singles.)	Margaret with Sara James and Zalia as part of Babie Lato	Cazzi Opeia; Jimmy Jansson; Jimmy Thörnfeldt; Lorine Talhaoui; Peter Boström; Thomas G:son	Babie Lato 2025	2025	
"Tell Me How Are Ya" †	Margaret	Thomas Karlsson; Joakim Buddee; Martin Eriksson	All I Need; Add the Blonde	2013	
"Tempo" †	Margaret	Anderz Wrethov; Jimmy Jansson; Laurell Barker; Sebastian von Koenigsegg	Melodifestivalen 2019	2019	
"Tempo (Live)"	Margaret	Anderz Wrethov; Jimmy Jansson; Laurell Barker; Sebastian von Koenigsegg	MTV Unplugged Margaret	2023	
"Ten dzień"	Margaret	Małgorzata Jamroży ‡; Piotr Kozieradzki; Jan Szarecki	Gaja Hornby	2019	
"Thank You Very Much" †	Margaret	Thomas Karlsson; Joakim Buddee	All I Need; Add the Blonde	2013	
"Thank You Very Much (Live)" †	Margaret	Joakim Buddee; Thomas Karlsson	MTV Unplugged Margaret	2023	
"They Can't Take That Away from Me"	Matt Dusk and Margaret	George Gershwin; Ira Gershwin	Just the Two of Us	2015	
"This Masquerade"	Matt Dusk and Margaret	Leon Russell	Just the Two of Us	2015	
"Too Little of Love"	Margaret	Margaret ‡; Joakim Buddee	Add the Blonde	2014	
"Układanki" †	Young Igi featuring Margaret	Igor "Young Igi" Ośmiałowski; Jan "Err Bits" Szarecki; Mateusz Kochaniec; Małgorzata "Margaret" Jamroży ‡; Mikołaj Trybulec; Piotr "Kacezet" Kozieradzki	Skan myśli (pre-order edition)	2019	
"Unisono"	Margaret featuring Astek	@atutowy; Jarosław Steciuk; Kacezet; Margaret ‡	Urbano Futuro	2023	
"VAJB"	Margaret featuring Gverilla	Małgorzata Jamroży ‡; Dominic Buczkowski; Jan Szarecki; Mateusz Kochaniec	Gaja Hornby	2019	
"Venus" †	Margaret with Natalia Kukulska, Bovska and Zalia as part of Babie Lato	Robbie van Leeuwen	Non-album single	2023	
"Vertigo"	Margaret with Hałastra, Dwa Sławy and Taco Hemingway as part of club2020	Dominik Gomez; Dominik Kwiatkowski; Filip Szcześniak; Jakub Dąbrowski; Konrad Żyrek; Jarek Steciuk; Małgorzata Jamroży ‡; Radek Średziński	club2020	2023	
"Vino" †	Margaret	Małgorzata Jamroży ‡; Piotr Kozieradzki	Non-album single	2022	
"Vino (Live)"	Margaret featuring Kayah	Piotr Kozieradzki	MTV Unplugged Margaret	2023	
"VIP" †	Margaret featuring Hanafi	Hanafi; Kacezet; Leeo; Margaret ‡; Urboishawty	Urbano Futuro	2023	
"Wasted" †	Margaret	Boris Potemkin; Anthony Whiting; Emily Philips; Robert Uhlmann; Thomas Karlsson	Add the Blonde	2014	
"What You Do" †	Margaret	Margaret ‡; Arash Labaf; Robert Uhlmann; Anderz Wrethov; Thomas Karlsson	Monkey Business	2017	
"What You Do (Live)"	Margaret	Alex Arash Labaf; Anderz Wrethov; Małgorzata Jamroży ‡; Robert Uhlmann; Thomas Karlsson	MTV Unplugged Margaret	2023	
"Wielkie mam sny"	Margaret	Małgorzata Jamroży ‡; Piotr Kozieradzki	Maggie Vision	2021	
"Woman (Live)"	Margaret	Aaron Thomas Horn; Ainsley Robert Jones; Amala Ratna Dlamini; David A. Sprecher; Jidenna T. Mobisson; Linden Jay; Lukasz Gottwald	MTV Unplugged Margaret	2023	
"Wyłącz internet"	Margaret	Bhavik Pattani; Kacezet; Margaret ‡	Siniaki i cekiny	2024	
"Xanax" †	Margaret	Małgorzata Jamroży ‡; Piotr Kozieradzki	Maggie Vision	2020	
"You Are the Sunshine of My Life"	Matt Dusk and Margaret	Stevie Wonder	Just the Two of Us	2015	
"Your Kiss Is on My List"	Matt Dusk and Margaret	Daryl Hall; Janna Allen	Just the Two of Us	2015	
"Zatańczmy ostatni raz"	Margaret	Bhavik Pattani; Margaret ‡; Marvin Prosper; Omerit Hield; Piotr Kozieradzki; Red One; Tori London	Body; Tripolar	2026	
"Zima"	Bartek Deryło featuring Margaret	Bartek Deryło; Hubert Radoszko; Małgorzata Jamroży ‡	Latawce	2021	
"Złap mnie, jeśli chcesz"	Margaret	Bhavik Pattani; Kacezet; Margaret ‡; Ryan Bickley	Siniaki i cekiny ciąg dalszy	2024	
"Zwolnij" †	Kacezet and Margaret	Małgorzata Jamroży ‡; Piotr Kozieradzki	Non-album single	2025	

== See also ==
- Margaret discography
