= Margaret discography =

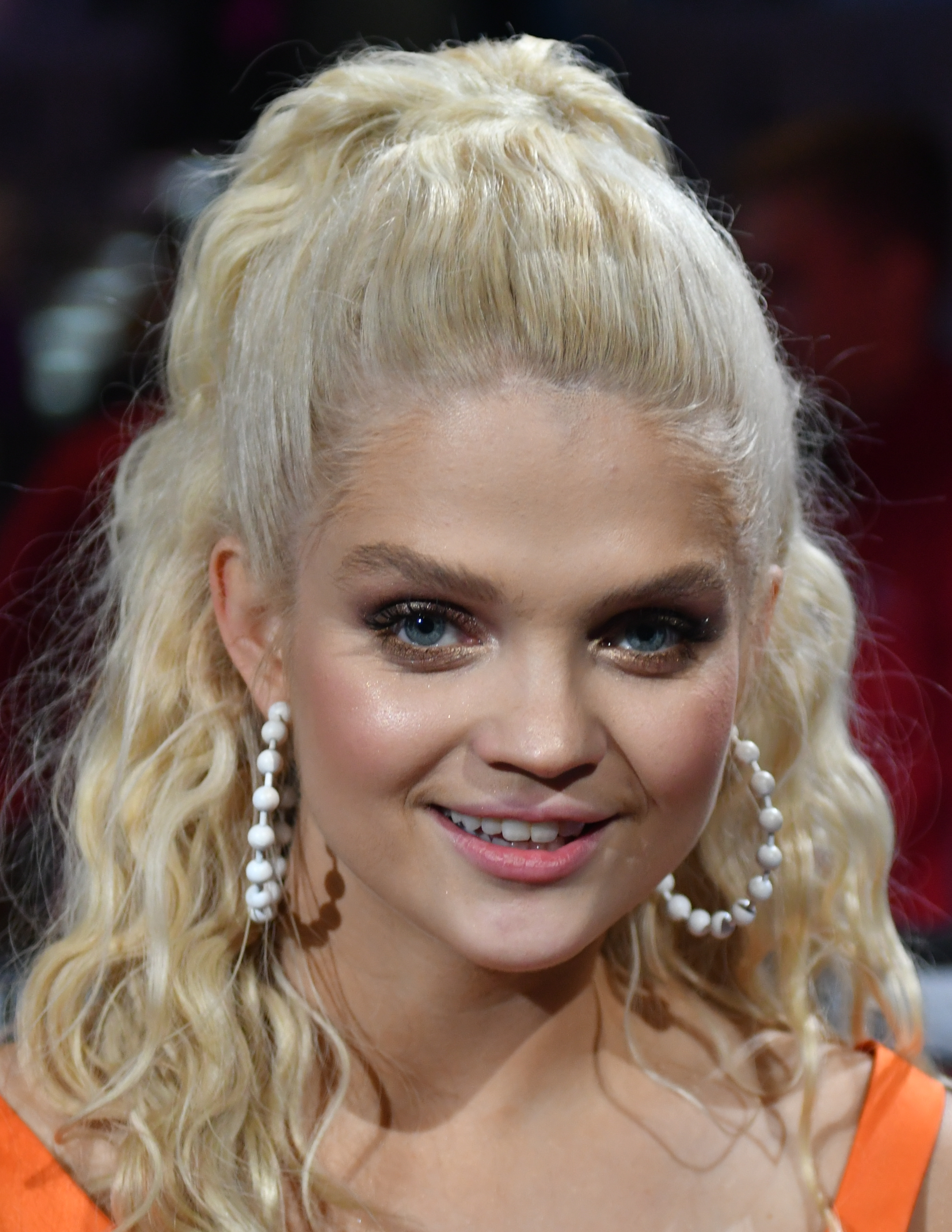
- Margaret during Melodifestivalen 2018 second semi-final in February 2018
- Studio albums: 7
- EPs: 6
- Live albums: 1
- Singles: 85
- Music videos: 76
- Reissue albums: 1

Margaret is a Polish singer and songwriter. She rose to prominence in 2013 after the release of her debut single, "Thank You Very Much", which charted in the top 30 in Italy, the top 40 in Austria and the top 50 in Germany, and was Poland's third best-selling Polish digital single of 2013. The song was later included on Margaret's first extended play (EP) All I Need, which was released in July 2013 and peaked at number 50 in Poland.

Her debut studio album, Add the Blonde, released in August 2014, contained all songs from All I Need and eight new tracks. It reached number eight in the Polish charts and was certified platinum by the Polish Society of the Phonographic Industry (ZPAV). The album yielded three singles, "Wasted", "Start a Fire" and "Heartbeat", released exclusively in Poland. "Wasted" and "Start a Fire" reached the top 10 of the Polish Airplay Chart, while "Heartbeat" peaked at number 11. The foremost was later also released in Scandinavia. Margaret's second studio album, Just the Two of Us (2015), recorded in collaboration with Canadian jazz singer Matt Dusk, consisted of jazz standards. The album reached the top 30 on the Polish albums chart, and received a platinum certification from ZPAV. It was promoted by two singles, the title track and the song "'Deed I Do". In 2015, Margaret also released the Polish-language version of the Christmas song "Wonderful Dream (Holidays Are Coming)" titled "Coraz bliżej święta", which was used in the Polish Coca-Cola Christmas television commercial. The song reached number 32 in the country upon its release, and has re-entered the Polish charts each holiday season since, peaking at number 15 in 2024. In December 2016, Margaret reissued her debut album to include the singles "Cool Me Down" and "Elephant". The former became her first Polish top five single, and also charted in the top 40 in Sweden. The song was certified, respectively, two-times platinum and gold in these countries. "Elephant" peaked at number 21 in Poland.

In 2017, Margaret released her third studio album, Monkey Business, which reached number eight on the Polish Albums Chart. Its singles, "What You Do" and "Byle jak" ("Anyhow"), charted at numbers fourteen and six in Poland, respectively. She next released the singles "In My Cabana" (2018) and "Tempo" (2019), which were her entries in the Swedish song competition Melodifestivalen. "In My Cabana" reached number three in Poland and number eight in Sweden, while "Tempo" charted at number seven in Poland and at number forty-three in Sweden. Her first Polish-language album (fourth overall), Gaja Hornby, was released in 2019 and placed at number 13 on the Polish albums chart. It spawned the singles "Gaja Hornby", "Serce Baila", "Chwile bez słów" (featuring Kacezet), and "Ej chłopaku". Margaret also featured on Polish rapper Young Igi's 2019 single "Układanki", which was certified two-times platinum by ZPAV. Her fifth studio album, Maggie Vision (2021), debuted at number five in Poland, and yielded nine singles including the ZPAV-certified songs "Reksiu" (featuring Otsochodzi) and "Roadster" (featuring Kizo). The subsequent EPs, Gelato (2021) and Urbano Futuro (2023), spawned several singles; "Tak na oko" from the former peaked at number 18 in Poland and received a platinum certification from ZPAV. In 2023, Margaret recorded five songs as part of the hip hop collective club2020 for their eponymous album, and released a live album from her MTV Unplugged concert special. Her sixth studio album, Siniaki i cekiny (2024), was supported by the chart-topping single "Tańcz głupia", as well as the singles "Niespokojne morze", "Dalej biegnę", "Bynajmniej", "Hot Like Summer" (with Álvaro Soler), "Miłego lata", "Mała ja" and "Margarita". The album's reissue, Siniaki i cekiny ciąg dalszy (2024), spawned the singles "Mamy farta" (featuring Pezet) and "Tak musiało być". In 2026, Margaret released the EPs Body and Mind, followed by her seventh studio album Tripolar. These included the singles "Później ci opowiem" (with Dawid Kwiatkowski) and "Primabalerina", which concurrently appeared in the top five of the Polish charts, and peaked at numbers four and two, respectively.

== Albums ==
=== Studio albums ===
List of studio albums, with selected chart positions and certifications
Title	Details	Peak chart positions	Certifications
Title	Details	POL	Certifications
Add the Blonde (Note: Released only in Poland.)	Released: 26 August 2014; Label: Extensive Music, Magic Records; Formats: CD, digital download, LP, streaming	8	ZPAV: Platinum
Just the Two of Us (with Matt Dusk)	Released: 6 November 2015; Label: Magic Records; Formats: CD, digital download, LP, streaming	28	ZPAV: Platinum
Monkey Business	Released: 2 June 2017; Label: Extensive Music, Magic Records; Formats: CD, digital download, streaming	8	
Gaja Hornby	Released: 17 May 2019; Label: Powerhouse, Artistars; Formats: CD, digital download, streaming	13	
Maggie Vision	Released: 12 February 2021; Label: Gaja Hornby Records, Sony Music Entertainment Poland; Formats: CD, digital download, streaming	5	
Siniaki i cekiny	Released: 26 April 2024; Label: Gaja Hornby Records, Sony Music Entertainment Poland; Formats: Digital download, LP, streaming	47	ZPAV: Gold
Tripolar	Released: 6 November 2026; Label: Gaja Hornby Records, Sony Music Entertainment Poland; Formats: CD, digital download, streaming	—	

=== Reissues ===
List of reissues
Title	Details
Siniaki i cekiny ciąg dalszy	Released: 15 November 2024; Label: Gaja Hornby Records, Sony Music Entertainment Poland; Formats: CD, digital download, streaming

=== Live albums ===
List of live albums, with selected chart positions
Title	Details	Peak chart positions
Title	Details	POL Physical
MTV Unplugged Margaret	Released: 26 April 2023; Label: Gaja Hornby Records, Revolume; Formats: CD, digital download, LP, streaming	48

== EPs ==
List of EPs, with selected chart positions
Title	Details	Peak chart positions
Title	Details	POL
All I Need	Released: 30 July 2013; Label: Extensive Music, Magic Records; Formats: CD, digital download, streaming	50
Gelato	Released: 2 July 2021; Label: Gaja Hornby Records, Sony Music Entertainment Poland; Formats: Digital download, streaming	—
Urbano Futuro	Released: 24 March 2023; Label: Gaja Hornby Records; Formats: Digital download, streaming	— (Note: Urbano Futuro did not enter the main Polish albums chart, but peaked at number 91 on Poland's albums streaming chart.)
Babie Lato 2025 (with Sara James and Zalia) (Note: The EP was released as part of music project Babie Lato.)	Released: 30 May 2025; Label: Good Taste Production; Formats: Digital download, streaming	—
Body	Released: 5 March 2026; Label: Gaja Hornby Records, Sony Music Entertainment Poland; Formats: Digital download, streaming	–
Voice	Released: 14 August 2026; Label: Gaja Hornby Records, Sony Music Entertainment Poland; Formats: Digital download, streaming	–
"—" denotes items which were not released in that country or failed to chart.

== Singles ==
=== 2010s ===
List of singles in the 2010s decade, with selected chart positions and certifications, showing year released and album name
Title	Year	Peak chart positions							Certifications	Album
Title	Year	POL Air.	POL Stream.	POL Billb.	AUT	GER	ITA	SWE	Certifications	Album
"It Will Be Lovely Day" (Note: Credited as Małgosia Jamroży.)	2012	—	*		—	—	—	—		Non-album single
"Thank You Very Much"	2013	— (Note: "Thank You Very Much" did not enter the Top 5 AirPlay Chart, but peaked at number 2 on the AirPlay New Chart.)	*		38	41	22	—		All I Need
"Tell Me How Are Ya"	2013	—	*		—	—	—	—		All I Need
"Wasted" (Note: Released only in Poland and Scandinavia.)	2014	6	*		—	—	—	—		Add the Blonde
"Start a Fire" (album version)	2014	10	*		—	—	—	—		Add the Blonde
"O mnie się nie martw"	2014	—	*		—	—	—	—		O mnie się nie martw
"Heartbeat"	2015	11	*		—	—	—	—		Add the Blonde
"Smak radości" (Note: "Smak radości" was included on the 2016 reissue of Add the Blonde but did not promote it. The song was recorded for Polish Coca-Cola commercial.)	2015	—	*		—	—	—	—		Add the Blonde
"'Deed I Do" (with Matt Dusk)	2015	—	*		—	—	—	—		Just the Two of Us
"Just the Two of Us" (with Matt Dusk)	2015	—	*		—	—	—	—		Just the Two of Us
"Coraz bliżej święta" (featuring The Voice of Poland 6 finalists)	2015	24	15	13	—	—	—	—		Non-album single
"Cool Me Down" (Note: The song was only included on the 2016 reissue of Add the Blonde.)	2016	4	*		—	— (Note: "Cool Me Down" did not enter the German singles chart, but peaked at number 96 on the German airplay chart.)	—	36	ZPAV: 2× Platinum; GLF: Gold	Add the Blonde
"Elephant"	2016	21	*		—	—	—	—		Add the Blonde
"Let It Snow!" (Matt Dusk featuring Margaret)	2016	–	*		—	—	—	—		Old School Yule! (Polish release)
"Blue Vibes"	2017	—	*		—	—	—	—		Smurfs: The Lost Village (Note: Polish-language version.)
"What You Do"	2017	14	*		—	—	—	—		Monkey Business
"6 in the Morning" (VAX featuring Margaret)	2017	—	*		—	—	—	—		Non-album single
"Byle jak" (Note: The song was only included on the deluxe edition of Monkey Business.)	2017	6	*		—	—	—	—		Monkey Business
"In My Cabana"	2018	3	*		—	—	—	8		Melodifestivalen 2018
"Lollipop"	2018	—	*		—	—	—	—		Non-album singles
"Błogość" (Kacezet featuring Margaret)	2019	—	*		—	—	—	—		Non-album singles
"Tempo"	2019	7	*		—	—	—	43		Melodifestivalen 2019
"Gaja Hornby"	2019	—	*		—	—	—	—		Gaja Hornby
"Serce Baila"	2019	—	*		—	—	—	—		Gaja Hornby
"Chwile bez słów" (featuring Kacezet)	2019	—	*		—	—	—	—		Gaja Hornby
"Układanki" (Young Igi featuring Margaret)	2019	—	*		—	—	—	—	ZPAV: 2× Platinum	Skan myśli (pre-order edition)
"Ej chłopaku"	2019	—	*		—	—	—	—		Gaja Hornby
"—" denotes items which were not released in that country or failed to chart. "*" denotes the chart did not exist at that time.

=== 2020s ===
List of singles in the 2020s decade, with selected chart positions and certifications, showing year released and album name
Title	Year	Peak chart positions			Certifications	Album
Title	Year	POL Air.	POL Stream.	POL Billb.	Certifications	Album
"Nowe plemię"	2020	—	*			Maggie Vision
"Przebiśniegi"	2020	—	*			Maggie Vision
"Reksiu" (featuring Otsochodzi)	2020	—	*		ZPAV: Gold	Maggie Vision
"Roadster" (featuring Kizo)	2020	—	*		ZPAV: Gold	Maggie Vision
"Fotel"	2020	—	*			Maggie Vision
"Xanax"	2020	—	*			Maggie Vision
"No Future" (featuring Kukon)	2020	—	*			Maggie Vision
"Bajkał" (1988 featuring Kacha and Margaret)	2021	—	*			Ruleta
"Antipop" (featuring Kara)	2021	—	*			Maggie Vision
"Sold Out" (featuring Natalia Szroeder)	2021	—	*			Maggie Vision
"Tak na oko"	2021	18	*		ZPAV: Platinum	Gelato
"Gelato" (featuring Tymek)	2021	—	*			Gelato
"CandyFlip" (RIP Scotty and Leeo featuring Margaret)	2021	—	*			Borderline
"Kocha" (Urboishawty featuring Kacezet and Margaret)	2021	—	*			Non-album singles
"Pod choinką" (Team X featuring Margaret)	2021	—	*			Non-album singles
"Oversize" (Anja Pham featuring Margaret and Kacezet)	2022	—	*			Non-album singles
"Cry in My Gucci"	2022	—	*	—		Non-album singles
"Vino"	2022	—	*	—		Non-album singles
"Hood Love (a ja nie)" (Pedro, Francis and Beteo featuring Margaret)	2022	—	*	—		Palma na blokach (deluxe edition)
"Niespokojne morze"	2022	28	*	—	ZPAV: Platinum	Siniaki i cekiny
"Mamona" (with Włodi)	2022	—	*	—		Non-album single
"Cute" (Viki Gabor featuring Margaret)	2022	—	*	—		ID
"Cypher2022" (as part of club2020 (Note: with Taco Hemingway, Oki, Otsochodzi, Young Igi, Łajzol, Gruby Mielzky, Hałastra, Kukon, Dwa Sławy, Young Leosia, CatchUp, Schafter, Dziarma, Szczyl and Miły ATZ))	2023	—	12	10	ZPAV: Gold	club2020
"Początek" (featuring Janusz Walczuk)	2023	—	—	—		Urbano Futuro
"Deszcz" (as part of club2020 (Note: with Otsochodzi, Taco Hemingway, Schafter, CatchUp, Dwa Sławy and Gruby Mielzky))	2023	—	29	—		club2020
"VIP" (featuring Hanafi)	2023	—	—	—		Urbano Futuro
"Mniejsza o to" (featuring Waima)	2023	—	—	—		Urbano Futuro
"Byle jak (Live)"	2023	—	—	—		MTV Unplugged Margaret
"Thank You Very Much (Live)"	2023	—	—	—		MTV Unplugged Margaret
"Reksiu (Live)" (featuring Otsochodzi)	2023	—	—	—		MTV Unplugged Margaret
"Cudowne lata" (with Natalia Kukulska, Mery Spolsky, Bovska and Zalia) (Note: The single was released as part of music project Babie Lato.)	2023	—	—	—		Non-album single
"Tańcz głupia"	2023	1	21	21	ZPAV: 2× Platinum	Siniaki i cekiny
"Dalej biegnę"	2023	—	—	—		Siniaki i cekiny
"Venus" (with Natalia Kukulska, Bovska and Zalia)	2023	—	—	—		Non-album single
"Goń" (Miętha featuring Margaret)	2023	—	—	—		Mięthlik
"Bynajmniej"	2023	8	—	—	ZPAV: Gold	Siniaki i cekiny
"Może zaczniemy w święta"	2023	—	—	—		Non-album single
"Hot Like Summer" (with Álvaro Soler) (Note: "Hot Like Summer" was released in two language versions: Polish titled "Hot Like Summer WAW" and English titled "Hot Like Summer AGP")	2024	—	—	—		Siniaki i cekiny
"Miłego lata"	2024	6	—	—	ZPAV: Gold	Siniaki i cekiny
"Błyszczę" (with Brodka and Rosalie.)	2024	—	—	—		Non-album single
"Mała ja"	2024	—	—	—		Siniaki i cekiny
"Margarita"	2024	18	—	—		Siniaki i cekiny
"Mamy farta" (featuring Pezet)	2024	—	—	—		Siniaki i cekiny ciąg dalszy
"Tak musiało być"	2025	18	—	—		Siniaki i cekiny ciąg dalszy
"Co za noc" (with Sara James and Zalia)	2025	20	—	—		Babie Lato 2025
"Tattoo" (with Sara James and Zalia) (Note: The single was released as part of music project Babie Lato, and exclusively on Spotify as part of Spotify Singles.)	2025	—	—	—		Babie Lato 2025
"Zwolnij" (with Kacezet)	2025	—	—	—		Non-album singles
"Kicia"	2025	—	—	—		Non-album singles
"Kłopoty" (with Hanafi, Hubi and Adash)	2025	—	—	—		Non-album singles
"Coraz bliżej święta (2025)"	2025	—	—	—		Non-album singles
"Let You Talk About It"	2026	22	—	—		Body
"Jetlag" (featuring Kizo)	2026	—	—	—		Body
"Później ci opowiem" (with Dawid Kwiatkowski)	2026	4	29	—	ZPAV: Gold	Południe
"Primabalerina"	2026	2	—	—		Voice
"Mogłeś tu być"	2026	—	—	—		Voice
"List do starych"	2026	—	—	—		Tripolar
"Połamane skrzydła"	2026	—	—	—		Tripolar
"—" denotes items which were not released in that country or failed to chart. "*" denotes the chart did not exist at that time.

== Other charted songs ==
List of other charted songs, with selected chart positions, showing year released and album name
Title	Year	Peak chart positions	Album
Title	Year	POL Stream.	Album
"Candy flip" (as part of club2020 (Note: with Dziarma and Young Leosia))	2023	68	club2020
"Late Night Show" (as part of club2020 (Note: with Oki, Dwa Sławy and Schafter))	2023	37	club2020
"Vertigo" (as part of club2020 (Note: with Hałastra, Dwa Sławy and Taco Hemingway))	2023	35	club2020

== Songwriting credits ==
Song	Year	Artist	Album	Notes	Ref.
"Całe szczęście"	2020	Magda Bereda	Mniejszeodtrzech	Co-writer	
"Ciało"	2021	Ewa Farna	Umami (Polish release)	Co-writer	
"Na skróty"	2022	Ewa Farna	Umami (Polish release)	Co-writer	
"Lollipop"	2022	Viki Gabor	ID	Co-writer	
"Zadzwonię później"	2023	Oki, Young Igi and Young Leosia as part of club2020	club2020	Co-writer	
"Answerphone"	2024	Viki Gabor	Terminal 3	Co-writer	
"Daj mi znak"	2024	Viki Gabor	Terminal 3	Co-writer	
"GPS"	2024	Viki Gabor	Terminal 3	Co-writer	
"Kiss and Fly"	2024	Viki Gabor	Terminal 3	Co-writer	
"Nie mieszaj"	2024	Viki Gabor	Terminal 3	Co-writer	
"Nie wiadomo"	2024	Viki Gabor	Terminal 3	Co-writer	
"Wizja"	2024	Viki Gabor	Terminal 3	Co-writer	
"Nie mam czasu!"	2026	Lina	Non-album single	Co-writer	

== Music videos ==
List of music videos, showing year released and director(s)
Title	Year	Director(s)	Ref.
As lead artist
"Moments" (with Otar Saralidze)	2011	Unknown	
"Thank You Very Much"	2013	Chris Piliero	
"Wasted"	2014	Julia Bui Ngoc	
"O mnie się nie martw"	2014	Jacek Kościuszko	
"Start a Fire" (2014 FIVB Volleyball Men's World Championship version)	2014	Unknown	
"Start a Fire" (album version)	2014	Olga Czyżykiewicz	
"Have Yourself a Merry Little Christmas"	2014	Sebastian Huber	
"Smak radości"	2015	Unknown	
"FourFiveSeconds" (featuring Sound'n'Grace and Wojciech Miecznikowski)	2015	Sebastian Huber and Mateusz Deoniziak	
"Heartbeat"	2015	Olga Czyżykiewicz	
"Dance for 2"	2015	Zuzanna Krajewska	
"'Deed I Do" (with Matt Dusk)	2015	Olga Czyżykiewicz	
"Just the Two of Us" (with Matt Dusk)	2015	Olga Czyżykiewicz	
"Coraz bliżej święta" (featuring The Voice of Poland 6 finalists)	2015	McCann Worldgroup	
"Kolęda warszawska 1939"	2015	Anna Powierża	
"Cool Me Down"	2016	Olga Czyżykiewicz	
"Atomówki"	2016	Unknown	
"Elephant"	2016	Bogna Kowalczyk	
"Mizerna cicha" (with Kuba Badach)	2016	CGM Creative Studio	
"Blue Vibes"	2017	Konrad Aksinowicz	
"What You Do"	2017	Konrad Aksinowicz	
"Monkey Business"	2017	Sandy Rzeźniczak and Maniek Kotarski	
"Nie chcę / Byle jak"	2017	Konrad Aksinowicz	
"Lollipop"	2018	Margaret, Sandy Rzeźniczak and Maniek Kotarski	
"Czuję miętę"	2019	Xawery Wolski	
"Tempo" (Up) (Note: The music video for "Tempo" has two versions labelled "Up" and "Down" which make one music video when played at the same time on two separate mobile devices with the devices put together.)	2019	Maciej Bieliński	
"Tempo" (Down)	2019	Maciej Bieliński	
"Daenerys & Jon Snow" (with Kacezet)	2019	Werona Rygiel and Robert Sampławski	
"Serce Baila"	2019	Maciej Nowak, Werona Rygiel and Robert Sampławski	
"Chwile bez słów" (featuring Kacezet)	2019	Xawery Wolski and Maciej Nowak	
"Ej chłopaku"	2019	Maciej Nowak	
"Nowe plemię" (Vertical Video)	2020	Julia Rogowska and Magda Zielińska	
"Reksiu" (featuring Otsochodzi)	2020	Maciej "Mac" Adamczak	
"Roadster" (featuring Kizo)	2020	Maciej "Mac" Adamczak	
"Xanax"	2020	Luke Jascz	
"Antipop" (featuring Kara)	2021	Moher	
"Sold Out" (featuring Natalia Szroeder)	2021	Łukasz Zabłocki	
"Tak na oko"	2021	Krzysztof Wróbel	
"Gelato" (featuring Tymek)	2021	Krzysztof Wróbel	
"Cry in My Gucci"	2022	Alex Pak	
"Vino"	2022	Luke Jascz	
"Niespokojne morze"	2022	Mateusz Reska	
"Początek" (featuring Janusz Walczuk)	2023	Darya Zahorskaya	
"VIP" (featuring Hanafi)	2023	Yungssebv and Pojman	
"Mniejsza o to" (featuring Waima)	2023	Yungssebv and Pojman	
"Cudowne lata" (with Natalia Kukulska, Mery Spolsky, Bovska and Zalia)	2023	Michał Radziejewski	
"Tańcz głupia"	2023	Alex Pak	
"Venus" (with Natalia Kukulska, Bovska and Zalia)	2023	Kacper Porembski	
"Bynajmniej"	2023	Alex Pak	
"Może zaczniemy w święta"	2023	Paweł Grabowski	
"Hot Like Summer AGP" (with Álvaro Soler)	2024	Paweł Grabowski	
"Hot Like Summer WAW" (with Álvaro Soler)	2024	Paweł Grabowski	
"Miłego lata"	2024	Michał Harmaciński	
"Błyszczę" (with Brodka and Rosalie.)	2024	Brodka	
"Mała ja"	2024	Archive footage	
"Margarita"	2024	Łukasz Jasiukowicz, Agata Niedziałkowska, Rafał Szydłowski, Paweł Muzyk	
"Mamy farta" (featuring Pezet)	2024	Piotr Zajączkowski	
"Tak musiało być"	2024	Piotr Zajączkowski	
"Co za noc" (with Sara James and Zalia)	2025	Alex Pak	
"Zwolnij" (with Kacezet)	2025	Unknown	
"Kicia"	2025	Michał Harmaciński	
"Let You Talk About It"	2026	Chernosliv	
"Później ci opowiem" (with Dawid Kwiatkowski)	2026	Marek A. Sobkiewicz-Hirsch	
"Primabalerina"	2026	Ewelina Kędzia, Kuba Kędzia	
"Mogłeś tu być"	2026	Ewelina Kędzia	
"List do starych"	2026	Chernosliv	
"Połamane skrzydła"	2026	Chernosliv	
As featured artist
"Gdy się Chrystus rodzi" (as part of Siemacha & Friends)	2015	Unknown	
"Układanki" (Young Igi featuring Margaret)	2019	Michał Korzewski and Piotr Czyżowski	
"Bajkał" (1988 featuring Kacha and Margaret)	2021	Dawid Misiorny and Tymon Nogalski	
"CandyFlip" (RIP Scotty and Leeo featuring Margaret)	2021	Izabela Zubrycka	
"Kocha" (Urboishawty featuring Kacezet and Margaret)	2021	Yungssebv and Pojman	
"Pod choinką" (Team X featuring Margaret)	2021	Paweł Grabowski and Aleksandra Mik	
"Oversize" (Anja Pham featuring Margaret and Kacezet)	2022	Greencactus	
"Hood Love (a ja nie)" (Pedro, Francis and Beteo featuring Margaret)	2022	Sebastian Jaskowiak and Karol Pojmański	
"Cute" (Viki Gabor featuring Margaret)	2022	Dawid Ziemba	
"Goń" (Miętha featuring Margaret)	2023	Ice Bobo and Ninka Lisek	

== See also ==
- List of songs recorded by Margaret
