= Maggie Vision =

Studio album by Margaret
- Released: 12 February 2021
- Genres: Hip hop; urban pop
- Length: 34:45
- Labels: Gaja Hornby; Sony
- Producer: Piotr "Kacezet" Kodzieradzki

Margaret chronology
Gaja Hornby (2019)	Maggie Vision (2021)	Gelato (2021)

Singles from Maggie Vision
- 1. "Nowe Plemię" Released: 19 March 2020; 2. "Przebiśniegi" Released: 17 April 2020; 3. "Reksiu" Released: 12 August 2020; 4. "Roadster" Released: 11 September 2020; 5. "Fotel" Released: 8 October 2020; 6. "Xanax" Released: 23 October 2020; 7. "No Future" Released: 10 November 2020; 8. "Antipop" Released: 29 January 2021; 9. "Sold Out" Released: 12 February 2021

Professional ratings
Review scores
Source	Rating
Codzienna Gazeta Muzyczna	3.5/5 stars
Interia	7/10 stars
Onet	4/6 stars
Polityka	5/10 stars

Maggie Vision is the fifth studio album by Polish singer and songwriter Margaret. It was released on 12 February 2021 by her record label Gaja Hornby Records and Sony Music Entertainment Poland. Originally scheduled for 27 November 2020, its release was delayed due to the COVID-19 pandemic in Poland. The album's limited edition containing a bonus track was made available to pre-order on 23 October 2020.

Maggie Vision is a combination of hip hop and urban pop, and was executive produced by Piotr "Kacezet" Kozieradzki. The themes discussed on the album include women's empowerment, mental health, Poland's political situation, drug use, and the dark side of fame and show business. It contains collaborations with Young Igi, Kizo, Otsochodzi, Kukon, Kara, Natalia Szroeder, Stanislavv and Urboishawty.

The album debuted at number five in the Polish charts. It spawned nine singles, including "Reksiu" and "Roadster" which have been certified gold by the Polish Society of the Phonographic Industry (ZPAV). The album's accompanying Maggie Vision Tour took place in October 2021.

== Promotion ==
=== Singles ===
The album was preceded by seven singles throughout 2020: "Nowe Plemię" on 19 March, "Przebiśniegi" on 17 April, "Reksiu" with Otsochodzi on 12 August, "Roadster" with Kizo on 11 September, "Fotel" and "Xanax" on 8 and 23 October, respectively, and "No Future" with Kukon on 10 November. On 29 January 2021, Margaret released the album's eighth single titled "Antipop" which features Kara. Its final single, "Sold Out", with Natalia Szroeder, was released on 12 February.

=== Maggie Vision Tour ===
The Maggie Vision Tour was Margaret's second headlining concert tour, which took place in five clubs in Poland between 8 and 23 October 2021.

List of concerts, showing date, city, country, and venue
Date	City	Country	Venue
8 October 2021	Szczecin	Poland	Kosmos
9 October 2021	Poznań	Poland	Próżność
16 October 2021	Wrocław	Poland	Akademia
22 October 2021	Sopot	Poland	Sfinks 700
23 October 2021	Warsaw	Poland	Niebo

== Track listing ==
Maggie Vision track listing
No.	Title	Writer(s)	Length
1.	"Przebiśniegi"	Małgorzata Jamroży; Piotr Kozieradzki; Jan Szarecki	2:09
2.	"Pure Fun" (featuring Young Igi)	Jamroży; Kozieradzki; Igor Ośmiałowski	2:26
3.	"Fotel"	Jamroży; Kozieradzki; Szarecki	2:32
4.	"Roadster" (featuring Kizo)	Jamroży; Kozieradzki; Patryk Woziński	2:45
5.	"Nowe Plemię"	Jamroży; Kozieradzki; Szarecki	2:28
6.	"Reksiu" (featuring Otsochodzi)	Jamroży; Kozieradzki; Szarecki; Eryk Sobus; Miłosz Stępień	2:42
7.	"No Future" (featuring Kukon)	Jamroży; Kozieradzki; Szarecki; Jakub Konopka	3:06
8.	"Piniata"	Jamroży; Kozieradzki; Bartek Czajka; Krzysztof Nowakowski	2:37
9.	"Introwersje" (featuring Stanislavv)	Jamroży; Kozieradzki; Stanisław Ślężak	2:48
10.	"Xanax"	Jamroży; Kozieradzki	2:40
11.	"Antipop" (featuring Kara)	Jamroży; Kozieradzki; Karolina Słowik	2:46
12.	"Sold Out" (featuring Natalia Szroeder)	Jamroży; Kozieradzki; Bhavik Pattani; Natalia Szroeder	3:02
13.	"Wielkie mam sny"	Jamroży; Kozieradzki	2:44
Total length:			34:45

Maggie Vision limited and digital edition bonus track
No.	Title	Writer(s)	Length
14.	"Say No More" (featuring Urboishawty)	Jamroży; Kozieradzki; Czajka; Sobus; Mikołaj Jędrzejewski	2:49
Total length:			37:34

== Charts ==
Chart performance for Maggie Vision
Chart (2021)	Peak position
Polish Albums (ZPAV)	5
