= Schafter =

Polish musician (born 2003)

schafter
- Born: Wojciech Laskowski; 2003 (age 22–23); Racibórz, Poland
- Origin: Jaworzno, Poland
- Genres: Hip hop; alternative hip hop; cloud rap
- Occupations: Rapper; singer; songwriter; record producer; music video director
- Years active: 2016–present
- Labels: Asfalt; restaurant posse; Universal Music

Schafter (stylized minuscule: schafter), actually Wojciech Laskowski (born 2003), is a Polish rapper, singer, record producer, music video director and songwriter.

== Early life ==
Laskowski was born in Racibórz, Poland in 2003. Schafter grew up in Jaworzno and initially dealt with production.

== Career ==
The first song with vocals "dead in designer clothes" he created in June 2016 and published it on SoundCloud under the pseudonym "restaurantposse 🌟". Already as a producer, he published his productions on the YouTube channel "Kstyk". On October 31, his debut mini-album "hors d'oeuvre" was released. The distribution of the recording in physical form was handled by Asfalt Records.

On May 24, 2019 the song "hot coffee" was released on schafter's channel, an announcement of the new album. The song resonated widely and became the hit of the summer. On November 22, 2019, the album "audiotele" was released on streaming and in stores, with guest appearances by, among others Taco Hemingway, Żabson or Belmondo. The album took 2nd place on OLiS. Universal Music was responsible for the physical release of the album.

On March 12, 2020 a joint song by Young Igi and schafter called "swimming lessons" was released. The song itself was not considered a single from the album, but was eventually included on it. About a year after its premiere, the song was certified gold.

On June 23, 2020 the single "push to talk" was released, which was the announcement of the album "FUTURA", available in stores and streaming services from November 27, 2020 (people who pre-ordered it had the opportunity to listen to the songs the day before ). The album took 6th place on OLiS, and the album itself featured such people as Rosalie, Houston X and Young Igi.

On March 24, 2021 the artist's most popular single "hot coffee" was awarded a diamond award.

== Discography ==
Studio albums

Year	Album details & Title	Peak chart positions	Certifications
Year	Album details & Title	POL	Certifications
2019	audiotele: Released: November 22, 2019; Label: restaurant posse, Universal Music; Format: CD, digital download	2	POL: Platinum
2020	futura: Released: November 27, 2020; Label: restaurant posse, Universal Music; Format: CD, digital download	6	

=== EP ===
Year	Album details & Title	Peak chart positions
Year	Album details & Title	POL
2019	hors d’oeuvre: Released: March 1, 2019; Label: restaurant posse, Asfalt Records; Format: CD, digital download	10

=== Singles ===
Year	Title	Peak chart positions					Certifications	Album
Year	Title	POL	POL NEW	RMF	SLiP	Eska	Certifications	Album
2017	„blow off”	–	–	–	–	–		hors d’oeuvre
2017	„blur”	–	–	–	–	–		hors d’oeuvre
2018	„blow off”	–	–	–	–	–		hors d’oeuvre
2018	„cameltoe”	–	–	–	–	–		hors d’oeuvre
2018	„candy.doll”	–	–	–	–	–		hors d’oeuvre
2019	„tom & jerry”	–	–	–	–	–		hors d’oeuvre
2019	„hot coffee”	41	2	15	13	23	ZPAV: diamond	audiotele
2019	„double D's" (feat: Żabson)	–	–	–	–	–	ZPAV: 2× platinum	audiotele
2019	„marvin”	–	–	–	–	–	ZPAV: platinum	audiotele
2019	„ridin’ round the town w czyimś bel air”	–	–	–	–	–	ZPAV: platinum	audiotele
2019	„bigos" (feat: Taco Hemingway)	–	–	–	–	–	ZPAV: platinum	audiotele
2019	„cirque du soleil" (feat: Oki)	–	–	–	–	–	ZPAV: gold	audiotele
2019	„pager" (feat: Belmondo)	–	–	–	–	–	ZPAV: gold	audiotele
2020	„swimming lessons" (feat: Young Igi)	–	–	–	–	–	ZPAV: gold	futura
2020	„push to talk”	–	–	–	–	–		futura
2020	„3.5 karrat”	–	–	–	–	–		futura
2020	„eskeemos”	–	–	–	–	–	ZPAV: gold	futura
„ –" means that the single was not listed on the chart.

==== Other listed or certified songs ====
Year	Title	Peak chart positions	Certifications	Album
Year	Title	LP3	Certifications	Album
2018	„DVD" – mlodyskiny (feat: schafter)	–	ZPAV: platinum	non-album single
2019	„9 żyć" – Kubi Producent (feat: schafter, Otsochodzi, PlanBe)	–	ZPAV: platinum	+18
2019	„Czy Ty słyszysz mnie?" – Daria Zawiałow (feat: schafter, Ralph Kaminski)	24	ZPAV: platinum	Helsinki (Special Edition)
„ –" means that the single was not listed on the chart.

=== Guest appearances ===
Year	Album & Other artist(s)	Title
2018	Młodszy Joe	„elegy driftin”
2018	Tondos	„Folklor”
2018	vkie – Primo EP	„Blondie”
2018	Deys – Oczka	„Nintendo”
2019	Otsochodzi – Miłość.	„Sezon" (feat: Schafter, Ten Typ Mes)
2019	Kubi Producent – +18	„9 żyć" (feat: Otsochodzi, schafter, PlanBe)
2019	Coals – Klan	„Blue”
2019	Daria Zawiałow – Helsinki (Special Edition)	„Czy Ty słyszysz mnie?" (feat: Schafter, Ralph Kaminski)
2019	Taco Hemingway – Pocztówka z WWA, lato ’19	„Alert RCB”
2020	Rosalie. – IDeal	„Ciemność”
2021	Hodak/2K – MOODY TAPES, VOLUME ONE	„Bez Zarzutów”
2021	CatchUp – Perypetie	„Weird Flex”
2021	vkie – Dżungla	, To i tamto”
