= Siemacha Association =

Polish non-profit organisation

- Stowarzyszenie Siemacha
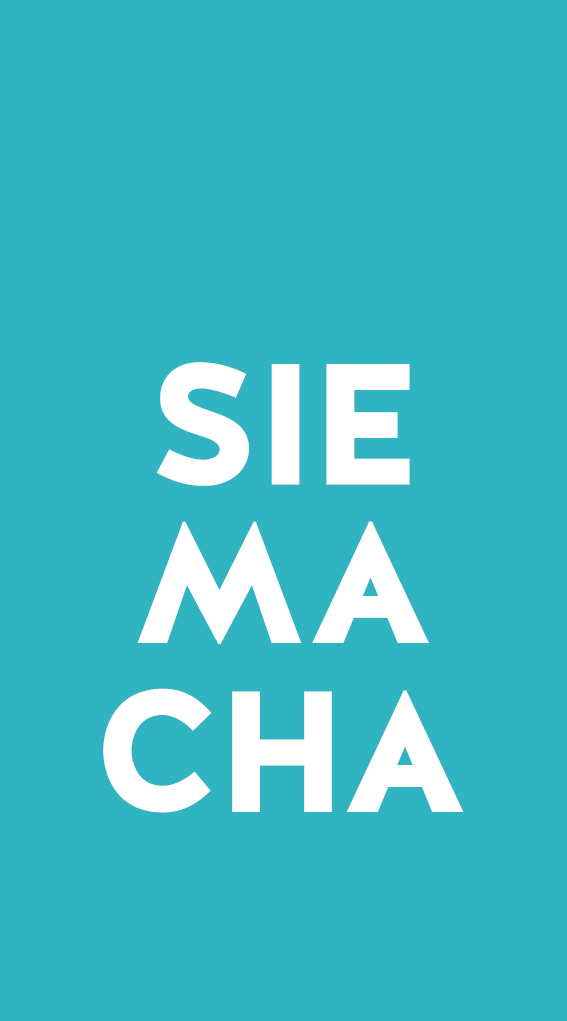
- Named after: Rev. Kazimierz Siemaszko CM (Siemacha)
- Formation: 30 November 2003; 22 years ago
- Founder: Rev. Andrzej Augustyński CM
- Founded at: Kraków
- Type: NGO, non-profit (NPO)
- Legal status: public benefit status (OPP)
- Purpose: children's care (day&night), education, therapy, sport
- Headquarters: 42 Długa St. Kraków, Polska, EU
- Services: daytime centres, orphanages, sport centres (Com-Com Zone), senior's support
- Official language: Polish
- Board of directors: Ms. Irena Kruczek, Ms. Anna Litwora, Ms. Marta Syrda, Mr. Mariusz Hornowski
- Main organ: executive board
- Budget: € 7mln yearly (2019)
- Staff: 265 employees: educators, coaches, therapists
- Website: www.smhassociation.eu
- Formerly called: „U Siemachy”

Siemacha Association (Stowarzyszenie Siemacha) is a Polish membership-based non-profit organization founded in November 2003 in Kraków in order to establish an institutional framework for specialised day-care facilities operating in Kraków since October 1993 under the name: Dzienne Ośrodki Socjoterapii "U Siemachy" (Day-care socio-therapeutic facilities "At Siemacha's" ). The educational model stressed the significance of peer-to-peer relationships in the process of socialisation and building trust. The facilities had a set day schedule, numerous workshops and studios, planned subject-oriented classes and a team of professional educators.

== Heritage ==
Activities of the Association were organised in Father Kazimierz Siemaszko CM Educational Institution's building on 38 Długa St. (currently 42 Długa St.), Kraków, Poland. Because of spreading poverty and demoralization, in 1886, he used it to establish "a place of shelter and voluntary work for poor abandoned boys". After his death in 1904, it was renamed as Zakład Wychowawczy im. ks. Siemaszki (Father Siemaszko Educational Institution). It operated until 1954 when it was taken over by the communist authorities. The last director was Mons. Albin Małysiak, who later became the auxiliary bishop of the Archdiocese of Kraków. After almost 40 years, the building that was used as a child welfare facility until 1991, was given back to its rightful owners. After all the necessary preparations, on the 2nd of October 1993 cardinal Franciszek Macharski celebrated the opening of the new facility for schoolgirls and schoolboys in need. It was a day-care facility offering after-school educational and creative activities, psychological support, meals and group excursions.

== Services ==
The Association was established in November 2003 in Kraków and it was registered in May 2004. It received the status of a public benefit organization in September 2004. On registering the Association, the building on 42 Długa St. became its seat and underwent broad revitalisation. All workshops, offices and administration rooms were modernised. A new auditorium was added in 2008 meant for organising events, meetings and daily activities for children. The Siemacha Association focuses on operating day-care facilities, orphanages, modern sports facilities as well as counselling and therapy facilities. The Association conducts long-term public services commissioned by local authorities. It acquires funds from sponsors, uses donations from 1% of income tax and runs its own business activity. The organisation pays great attention to the quality of its services. Siemacha facilities are operating as a consistent system offering multi-dimensional support to children and their families. The Association sees opportunities in the growing demand for professional social services, the popularisation of the concept of social entrepreneurship and corporate social responsibility. The organization combines a variety of facilities for children into one organism with a diversified offer. The Association is apolitical. The Association's strategic partners are the Fundacja Demos (Demos Foundation) and the PKO Bank Polski Foundation. The Association collaborates with local authorities - it performs social services and organises events, participates in promotional activities and exchange of experience.

== Innovations ==
Collaboration with shopping mall owners results in establishing modern youth facilities located at the malls or in their vicinity. The first facility of that kind was opened in November 2010 by Gemini Park Tarnów and later on in other locations: Kraków, Kielce, Rzeszów, Wrocław. Since September 2014, the Association has been running an orphanage, a day-care facility, a holiday facility, sports facility and an equestrian sports centre in Odporyszów nearby Tarnów. On the 21st of December 2014, the President of the European Council - Donald Tusk, officially opened the Siemacha Spot in Odporyszów.

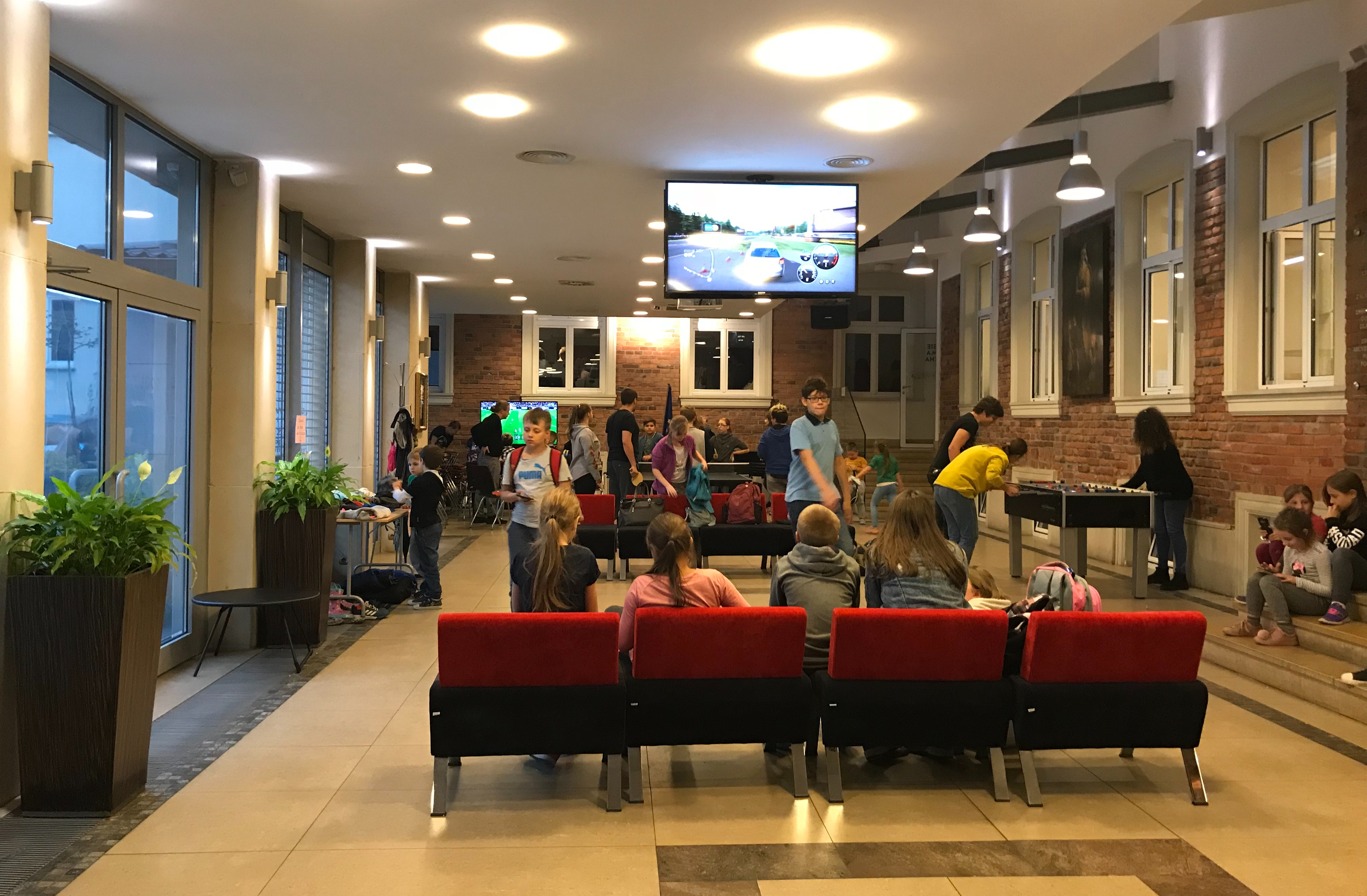
Siemacha Spot at Father Siemaszko House, Kraków

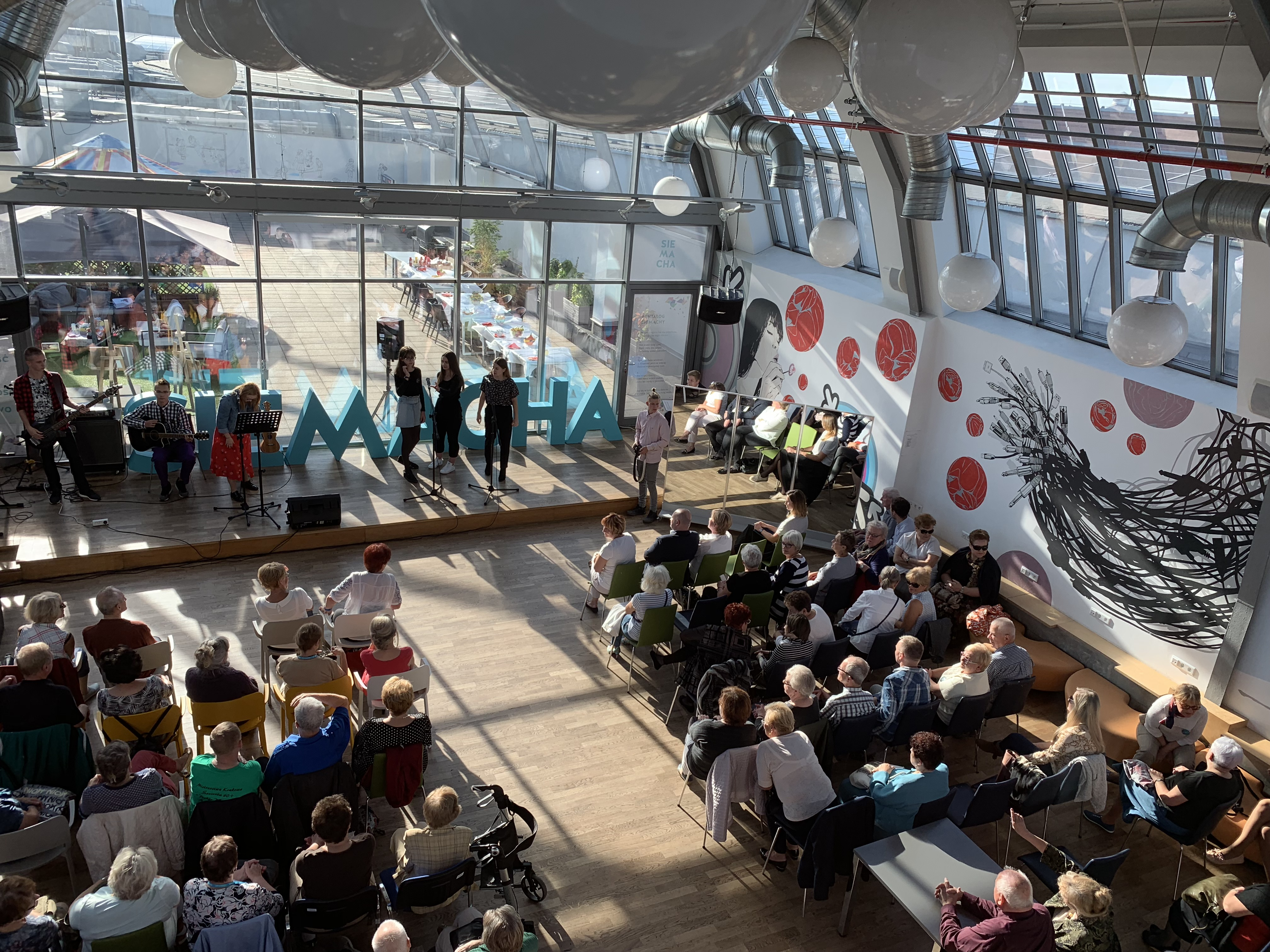
Siemacha Spot at Bonarka City Center, Kraków

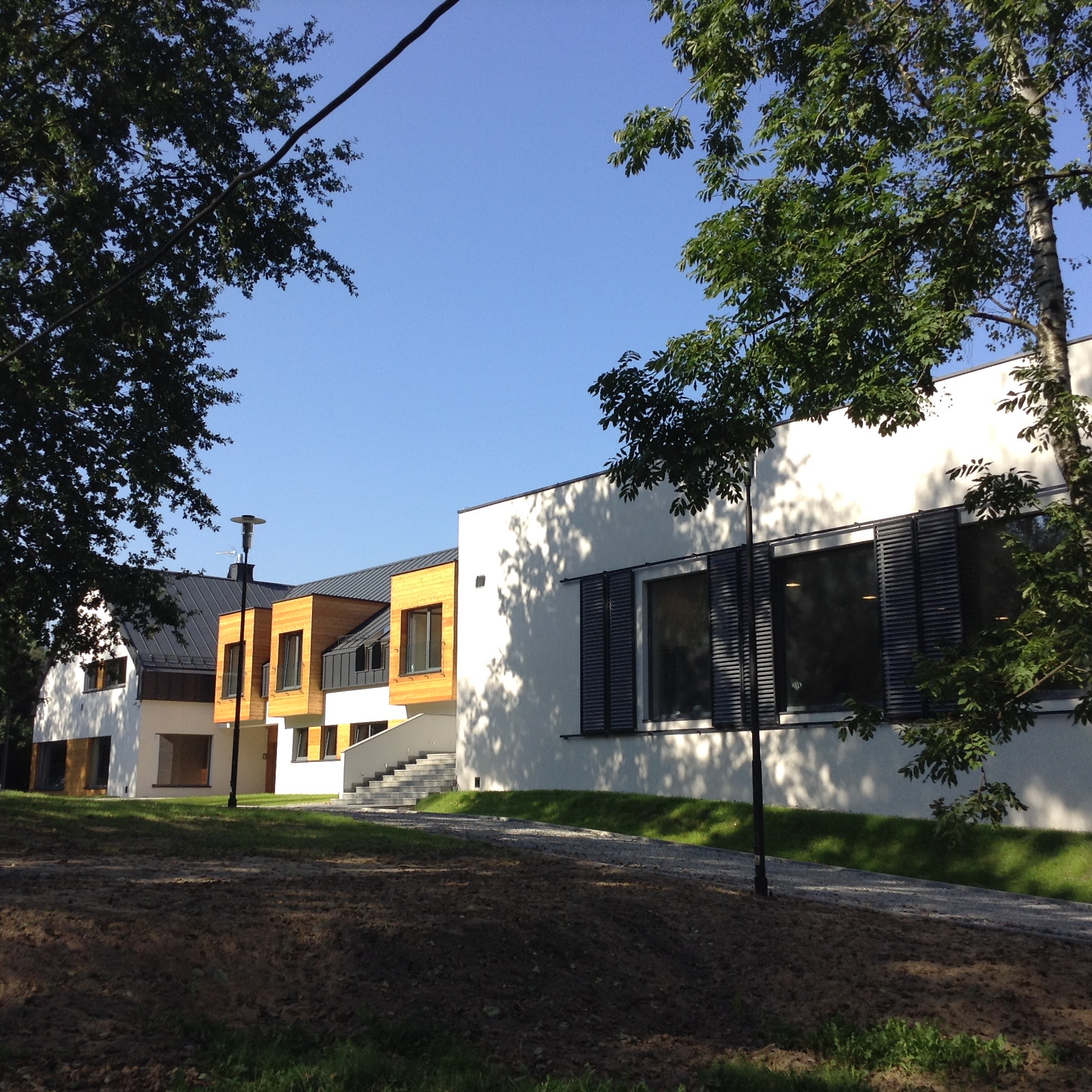
Siemacha Spot in Odporyszów

== Awards ==
- Nagroda Organizacja Społeczna Roku (NGO of the Year Award), Krynica 2014
- Nagroda Małopolski Lider Przedsiębiorczości Społecznej (Lesser Poland Leader of Social Entrepreneurship Awards), Wieliczka 2011
- Cities for Children Award, Stuttgart 2010
- Nagroda Anioł Ciepła (The Angel of the Warmth Award), Tarnów 2010
- Nagroda Pro Publico Bono (Pro Publico Bono Award), Kraków 2006
- Nagroda Kryształy Soli (Salt Cristals Award), Kraków 2006
- Nagroda Totus (The Totus Award), Warszawa 2001

Awards listed on Siemacha Association's website.
