= Gee, Baby, Ain't I Good to You =

1929 jazz song

Single by The King Cole Trio
- A-side: "I Realize Now"
- Released: 1944
- Recorded: 30 November 1943
- Studio: C.P. MacGregor, Hollywood
- Length: 2:54
- Label: Capitol Records
- Songwriters: Andy Razaf, Don Redman
- Producer: Johnny Mercer

The King Cole Trio singles chronology
"Straighten Up and Fly Right" (1944)	"Gee, Baby, Ain't I Good to You" (1944)	"The Frim-Fram Sauce" (1945)

"Gee, Baby, Ain't I Good to You" is a 1929 song written by Andy Razaf and Don Redman. It was recorded by the Redman-led McKinney's Cotton Pickers on Victor on November 5, 1929, as "Gee, Ain't I Good to You."

== King Cole Trio recording ==
Nat King Cole's King Cole Trio recorded the song on November 30, 1943, during a three-hour recording session at C.P. MacGregor Studios in Hollywood. "Straighten Up and Fly Right," "If You Can’t Smile and Say Yes", and "Jumpin' at Capitol" were recorded during the same session, produced by Johnny Mercer and engineered by John Palladino. The single peaked at number 20 on the national charts and was the group's final number 1 on the Harlem Hit Parade. The A-side of the song, "I Realize Now" peaked at number 9 on the Harlem Hit Parade. It is usually played in E flat.

== Other notable recordings ==
Other notable recordings of the song include versions by: Lou Rawls, Dizzy Gillespie, Count Basie, Billie Holiday, Peggy Lee, Ella Fitzgerald, Phineas Newborn Jr., Stanley Turrentine, Sonny Clark, Art Blakey, Ray Charles, Kenny Burrell, Diana Krall, John Scofield, Lyle Lovett, The Coasters, Julie London Bill Wurtz, T-Bone Walker, Dr John and Geoff Muldaur. Deana Martin recorded "Gee, Baby Ain't I Good To You" on her 2013 album, Destination Moon. In 2015, Matt Dusk and Margaret recorded a version for their album, Just the Two of Us.

== Popular culture ==
- The song was featured in the 1994 movie The Mask, performed by Susan Boyd who dubbed Cameron Diaz's singing voice for her character Tina Carlyle.
