= Kizo =

Polish rapper and songwriter (born 1994)

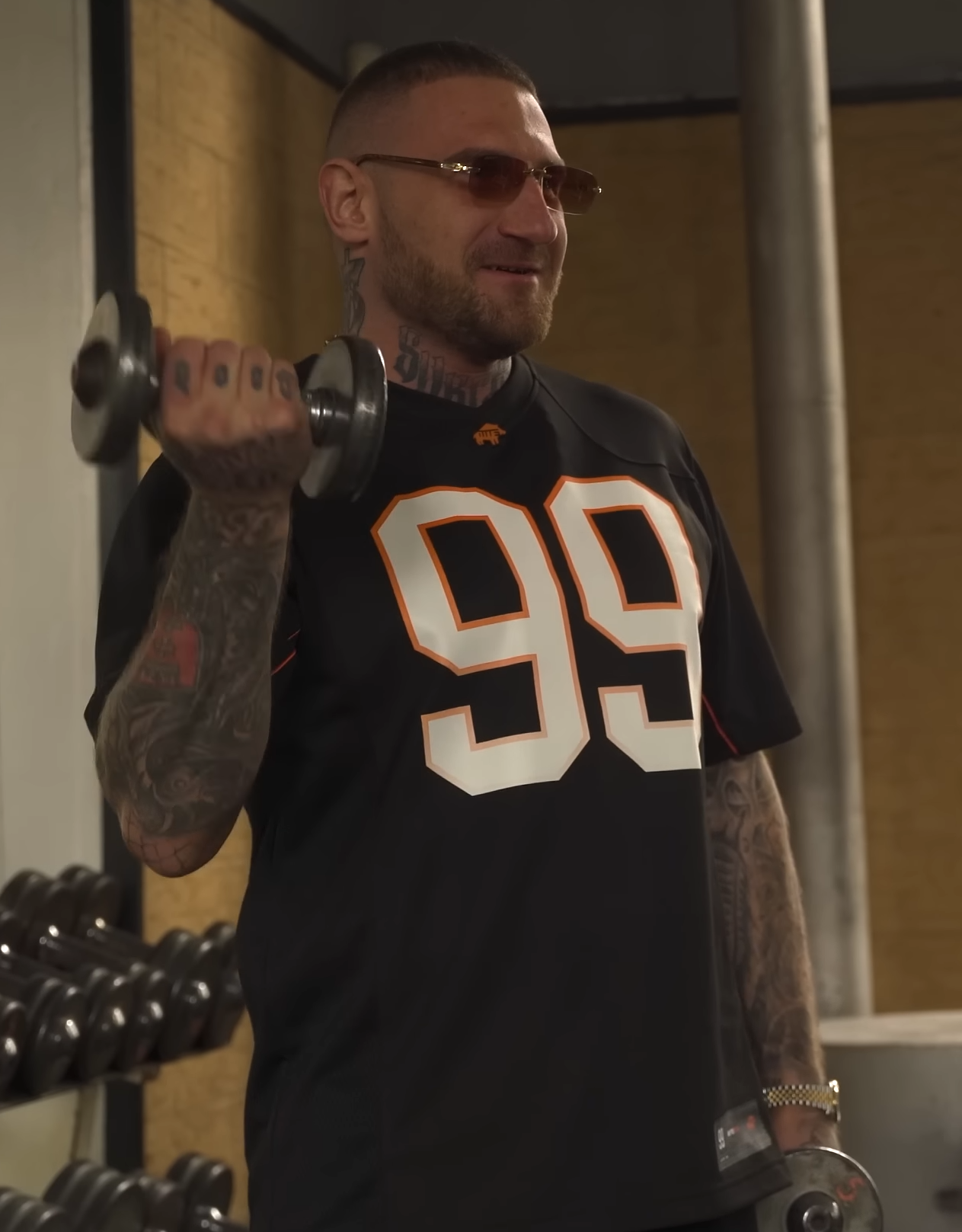
- Kizo in March 2023

Background information
- Born: Patryk Woziński; 26 June 1994 (age 32); Gdańsk, Poland
- Genres: Pop; trap; afro trap; hip hop
- Occupations: Singer; songwriter; rapper; record producer
- Years active: 2009–present

Patryk Woziński (born 26 June 1994), known professionally as Kizo, is a Polish singer, songwriter and record producer. He has collaborated with artists such as: Tymek, Borixon, Wac Toja, Margaret, Young Igi, Szpaku and Malik Montana. Kizo is also a member of the supergroup Chillwagon. In 2023, he became the promoter of the MTS Sport Management Group.

== Early life ==
Woziński was born on 26 June 1994 in Gdańsk.

== Musical career ==
Kizo started his musical career in 2009. In the beginning of his activities, he was associated with the Ciemna Strefa. In 2018, his debut album Ortalion was released in cooperation with Step Records and the album Czempion. In 2019, he released the album Pegaz, and in 2020 he released the album Posejdon via the chillwagon label. His next album Another Five Minutes, was released in 2021, includes the hit "Disney", which 10 months after its premiere exceeded over 100 million views on YouTube. He also works with rappers such as Jongmen and Bonus RPK on the project Heavyweight.

== Products ==
In March 2022, Kizo introduced his branded coconut bars "Kizzers", in cooperation with SFD. The premiere of this product took place on 31 March in the Biedronka chain of stores.

Two months later, photos of a frozen, cheese pizza - Big Cheese with the image of the rapper and the inscription Pizza from Kizo on the cover of the product called "Sukcesiliana" appeared on the Facebook group HSPL - FOOD. After a few days, the second version of Głosiliana was presented, but this time with meat - Extra Meat BBQ. On 25 May 2022, both products appeared in the Żabka chain of stores throughout Poland.

On 8 August 2022, he announced Smaczna Kawusie from SFD, a caramel-flavored iced coffee, which premiered on 18 August in the Biedronka chain of stores. On the same day, Kizo posted a short video on his YouTube channel, promoting a new variant of Kizzers peanut-flavored bars. The product premiere took place a week later. Another product introduced by Kizo in the same year was Kizzers Cream with coconut-nougat flavor and wafers. On 29 September 2022, the product hit the shelves of the Biedronka store chain.

== Discography ==
=== Studio albums ===
Year	Album	Peak chart positions	Sales	Certifications
Year	Album	POL	Sales	Certifications
2018	Ortalion: Release: 18 May 2018; Label: Step Records; Format: CD, digital download	35		
2018	Czempion: Release: 21 November 2018; Label: Soul Records; Format: CD, digital download	19		
2019	Pegaz: Release: 26 April 2019; Label: Soul Records; Format: CD, digital download	2	POL: 15,000+	ZPAV: Gold
2019	Złoto i biel: Release: 25 October 2019; Label: Soul Records; Format: CD, digital download	4		
2020	Posejdon: Release: 23 October 2020; Label: chillwagon.co; Format: CD, digital download	2	POL: 30,000+	ZPAV: Platinum
2021	Jeszcze pięć minut: Release: 22 October 2021; Label: chillwagon.co; Format: CD, digital download	1	POL: 150,000+	ZPAV: Diamond
2022	Ostatni taniec: Release: 17 June 2022; Label: Universal Music Polska; Format: CD, digital download	1	POL: 30,000+	ZPAV: Platinum
2023	Patocelebryta: Release: 15 September 2023; Label: Universal Music Polska; Format: CD, digital download	1	POL: 90,000+	ZPAV: 3× Platinum
