= Monkey Business (Margaret album) =

Studio album by Margaret
- Released: 2 June 2017
- Genres: Pop; EDM; teen pop; reggae
- Length: 34:04
- Labels: Extensive; Magic

Margaret chronology
Just the Two of Us (2015)	Monkey Business (2017)	Gaja Hornby (2019)

Singles from Monkey Business
- 1. "What You Do" Released: 12 May 2017; 2. "Blue vibes" Released: 17 March 2017; 3. "Monkey Business" Released: 1 September 2017; 4. "Byle jak" Released: 21 December 2017

Professional ratings
Review scores
Source	Rating
Interia	6/10 stars
Onet	7/10 stars

Monkey Business (stylized as Monkey Bu$iness) is the third studio album by Polish singer Margaret. It was released only in Poland. The album was made available to stream exclusively on Tidal on 29 May 2017. Its deluxe edition, with two additional tracks, was released exclusively to Empik on 1 June 2017. The album was officially released on 2 June 2017 by Extensive Music and Magic Records.

Monkey Business's lead single, "What You Do", was released on 12 May 2017, followed by "Byle jak" ("Anyhow") on 21 December. It also includes the single "Blue Vibes", which was recorded for the Polish-language version of the 2017 animated feature film, Smurfs: The Lost Village.

Monkey Business peaked at number eight on Polish Albums Chart.

== Track listing ==
Monkey Business
No.	Title	Writer(s)	Producer(s)	Length
1.	"Monkey Business"	Joakim Buddee; Thomas Karlsson; Margaret	Buddee	3:27
2.	"Blue Vibes"	Buddee; Ingrid Hägglund; Dimitri Stassos; Margaret	Stassos; Buddee	3:12
3.	"What You Do"	Margaret; Arash Labaf; Robert Uhlmann; Anderz Wrethov; Karlsson	Uhlmann; Labaf; Alex Papaconstantinou	3:03
4.	"Color of You" (featuring Tape Machines)	Simon Gribbe; Fredrik Jansson; Karlsson; Margaret	Jansson; Gribbe	3:14
5.	"Super Human"	Buddee; Margaret; Karlsson	Buddee	3:57
6.	"Over You"	Buddee; Karlsson; Margaret	Buddee	3:14
7.	"Future Me Problem"	Karlsson; Jenny Langlo; Molly Pettersson Hammar; Lorenz Schimpf	Schimpf	3:03
8.	"Glorious"	Buddee; Josefin Glenmark; Karlsson; Margaret	Buddee	3:30
9.	"Cuz It's You"	Buddee; Karlsson; Margaret	Buddee	3:42
10.	"Funky Song"	Karlsson; Margaret; Paulo Mendonça	Mendonça	3:37
Total length:				33:59

Monkey Business – Deluxe edition
No.	Title	Writer(s)	Producer(s)	Length
11.	"Nie chcę" (featuring Marcin Januszkiewicz)	Marcin Januszkiewicz; Andrzej Perkman	Margaret; Chris Aiken	3:17
12.	"Byle jak"	Emil Gullhamn; Sebastian Hallifax; Stassos; Margaret	Stassos	3:00
Total length:				40:16

== Charts ==
Chart (2017)	Peak position
Polish Albums (ZPAV)	8

== Release history ==
Region	Date	Format	Version	Label	Ref.
Poland	29 May 2017	Streaming (only Tidal)	Deluxe	Extensive Music; Magic Records	
Poland	1 June 2017	CD (only Empik)	Deluxe	Extensive Music; Magic Records	
Poland	2 June 2017	Digital download; streaming	Deluxe	Extensive Music; Magic Records	
Poland	2 June 2017	CD	Standard	Extensive Music; Magic Records	
