= In My Cabana =

Single by Margaret
- Released: 10 February 2018
- Recorded: 2017
- Genre: Pop
- Length: 2:52
- Label: Extensive; Warner; Magic
- Songwriter(s): Anderz Wrethov; Linnea Deb; Arash Labaf; Robert Uhlmann

Margaret singles chronology
"Byle jak" (2017)	"In My Cabana" (2018)	"Lollipop" (2018)

"In My Cabana" is a song by Polish singer Margaret. It was written by Anderz Wrethov, Linnea Deb, Arash Labaf, and Robert Uhlmann. The song was released for digital download on 10 February 2018 by Extensive Music and Warner Music in various countries, and by Magic Records in Poland.

Margaret participated in Melodifestivalen 2018, Sweden's national selection for Eurovision Song Contest 2018, with "In My Cabana". She qualified for the final through the Andra chansen ("Second chance") round, and finished in seventh place with 103 points. The single peaked at number three on the Polish Airplay Chart and at number eight on the Swedish Singles Chart.

Live recording of "In My Cabana" from Margaret's MTV Unplugged concert special was released on its accompanying live album in 2023.

== Charts ==
=== Weekly charts ===
Weekly chart performance for "In My Cabana"
Chart (2018)	Peak position
Poland (Polish Airplay Top 100)	3
Sweden (Sverigetopplistan)	8

=== Year-end charts ===
Year-end chart performance for "In My Cabana"
Chart (2018)	Position
Poland (ZPAV)	26

== Release history ==
Release history and formats for "In My Cabana"
Region	Date	Format	Label	Ref.
Various	10 February 2018	Digital download; streaming	Extensive Music; Warner Music Sweden	
Poland	10 February 2018	Digital download; streaming	Extensive Music; Magic	
