= Byle jak =

Single by Margaret

from the album Monkey Business
- Released: 21 December 2017
- Genre: Pop
- Length: 3:00
- Label: Magic
- Songwriters: Emil Gullhamn; Sebastian Hallifax; Dimitri Stassos; Margaret
- Producer: Dimitri Stassos

Margaret singles chronology
"6 in the Morning" (2017)	"Byle jak" (2017)	"In My Cabana" (2018)

"Byle jak" (English: "Anyhow") is a song by Polish singer Margaret. It was included on the deluxe edition of her third studio album, Monkey Business (2017). The song was written by Emil Gullhamn, Sebastian Hallifax, Dimitri Stassos, and Margaret, and produced by Stassos. It was released to contemporary hit radio in Poland on 21 December 2017 as the second single from Monkey Business, premiering on Radio ZET.

Margaret added "Byle jak" to her concert set list in June 2016, a year before its official studio version was released on Monkey Business. She revealed in 2018 that she wrote the song for another Polish artist (later confirmed to be Grzegorz Hyży) three years prior, but after he did not record it, she decided to include it on her album. Margaret performed "Byle jak" for the first time on television in September 2017 at the National Festival of Polish Song broadcast by TVP1. The single reached number six on the Polish Airplay Chart, and earned Margaret her first Fryderyk nomination. Its music video was the 10th most watched Polish music video on YouTube in 2018.

On 14 April 2023, Margaret released live version of "Byle jak" as the lead single from her MTV Unplugged concert special and its accompanying live album.

== Music video ==
A music video for "Byle jak" was released as a short film titled "Nie chcę / Byle jak", which also served as a music video for another song from Monkey Business, "Nie chcę" ("I Don't Want To"). The film was directed by Konrad Aksinowicz, who also co-wrote its screenplay with Margaret. It premiered exclusively at Multikino in Złote Tarasy, Warsaw, Poland on 22 November 2017, a few days before being officially released on YouTube.

Its shortened version which only included the "Byle jak" section of the video was the 10th most watched Polish music video on YouTube in 2018 with 39.3 million views as of 6 December 2018 when the list was published.

== Accolades ==
Year	Ceremony	Category	Result	Ref.
2018	RMF FM and Polsat's Hit of the Summer	Hit of the Summer	Won	
2019	Fryderyk	Audience Award – Hit of the Year	Nominated	

== Charts ==
=== Weekly charts ===
Chart (2018)	Peak position
Poland Airplay (ZPAV)	6

=== Year-end charts ===
Chart (2018)	Peak position
Poland (Airplay 2018)	34

== Release history ==
Region	Date	Format	Label	Ref.
Poland	21 December 2017	Contemporary hit radio	Magic Records	
