= Just the Two of Us (Matt Dusk and Margaret album) =

Studio album by Matt Dusk and Margaret
- Released: 6 November 2015
- Genre: Jazz
- Length: 58:50
- Label: Magic
- Producer: Matt Dusk; Margaret; Shelly Berger

Matt Dusk chronology
Lost in Rio (2015)	Just the Two of Us (2015)	Quiet Nights (2016)

Margaret chronology
Add the Blonde (2014)	Just the Two of Us (2015)	Monkey Business (2017)

Singles from Just the Two of Us
- 1. "'Deed I Do" Released: 23 October 2015; 2. "Just the Two of Us" Released: 23 October 2015

Professional ratings
Review scores
Source	Rating
Jazz Forum	3.5/5 stars
Onet	7/10 stars

Just the Two of Us is a collaborative album by Canadian singer Matt Dusk and Polish singer Margaret. It consists of their interpretations of jazz standards. Dusk handled its production, and Margaret and Shelly Berger co-produced it. The album was recorded in Canada and Poland. It was released on 6 November 2015, through Magic Records, only in Poland. Its limited edition was released the same day exclusively to Empik. On 21 January 2016, it was released on a 12-inch vinyl with altered tracklist.

The album spawned two singles: "'Deed I Do" and "Just the Two of Us". It reached number 28 on the Polish Albums Chart, and was certified platinum by the Polish Society of the Phonographic Industry (ZPAV).

== Track listing ==
Just the Two of Us
No.	Title	Length
1.	"Quiet Nights of Quiet Stars (Corvocado)"	4:46
2.	"Just the Two of Us"	3:30
3.	"Something Stupid"	3:27
4.	"'Deed I Do"	6:11
5.	"Gee Baby, Ain't I Good to You"	4:48
6.	"You Are the Sunshine of My Life"	4:03
7.	"Your Kiss Is on My List"	4:59
8.	"This Masquerade"	4:54
9.	"Girl from Ipanema (Garota de Ipanema)"	5:31
10.	"How Insensitive (Insensatez)"	4:24
11.	"Our Love Is Here to Stay"	4:24
12.	"They Can't Take That Away from Me"	5:12
13.	"I Got It Bad and That Ain't Good" (Bonus track; Margaret solo)	2:41
Total length:		58:50

Just the Two of Us — Limited edition
No.	Title	Length
1.	"Quiet Nights of Quiet Stars (Corvocado)"	4:46
2.	"Just the Two of Us"	3:30
3.	"Something Stupid"	3:27
4.	"'Deed I Do"	6:11
5.	"Gee Baby, Ain't I Good to You"	4:48
6.	"You Are the Sunshine of My Life"	4:03
7.	"Your Kiss Is on My List"	4:59
8.	"This Masquerade"	4:54
9.	"Girl from Ipanema (Garota de Ipanema)"	5:31
10.	"How Insensitive (Insensatez)"	4:24
11.	"Our Love Is Here to Stay"	4:24
12.	"They Can't Take That Away from Me"	5:12
13.	"I Got It Bad (And That Ain't Good)" (Bonus track; Margaret solo)	2:41
14.	"Just the Two of us" (Bonus track; acoustic version)
15.	"'Deed I Do" (Bonus track; acoustic version)

Just the Two of Us — 12-inch vinyl Side A
No.	Title	Length
1.	"Quiet Nights of Quiet Stars (Corvocado)"	4:46
2.	"Just the Two of Us"	3:30
3.	"Something Stupid"	3:27
4.	"Girl from Ipanema (Garota de Ipanema)"	5:31

Side B
No.	Title	Length
1.	"'Deed I Do"	6:11
2.	"Our Love Is Here to Stay"	4:24
3.	"You Are the Sunshine of My Life"	4:03
4.	"Your Kiss Is on My List"	4:59
Total length:		36:51

== Accolades ==
Year	Ceremony	Category	Result	Ref.
2016	Róże Gali Awards	Music	Won	

== Charts ==
Chart (2015)	Peak position
Polish Albums (ZPAV)	28

== Certifications ==
Region	Certification	Certified units/sales
Poland (ZPAV)	Platinum	30,000^{‡}
^{‡} Sales+streaming figures based on certification alone.

== Release history ==
Region	Date	Format	Version	Label	Ref.
Poland	6 November 2015	CD; digital download	Standard	Magic Records	
Poland	6 November 2015	CD (only Empik)	Limited	Magic Records	
Poland	21 January 2016	12-inch vinyl	Altered standard	Magic Records	
