= 'Deed I Do =

Song
- Published: 1926
- Genre: Jazz
- Composer: Fred Rose
- Lyricist: Walter Hirsch

"'Deed I Do" is a 1926 jazz standard composed by Fred Rose with lyrics by Walter Hirsch. It was introduced by vaudeville performer S. L. Stambaugh and popularized by Ben Bernie's recording. It was recorded by influential clarinetist and bandleader Benny Goodman as his debut recording in December 1926 with Ben Pollack and His Californians. Ruth Etting's rendition of the song became a top ten hit in 1927 as did the version by Johnny Marvin.

== Other recorded versions ==
- Lena Horne with Luther Henderson's Orchestra (May 1948); reached No. 26 in the US charts.
- Bing Crosby on his 1956 album Bing Sings Whilst Bregman Swings.
- Blossom Dearie on her 1957 album Blossom Dearie.
- Perry Como on his 1957 album We Get Letters.
- Ella Fitzgerald and Count Basie on their 1963 album Ella and Basie!.
- Marvin Gaye & Mary Wells on their album Together (1964).
- Matt Dusk and Margaret — Just the Two of Us (2015).

== See also ==
- List of 1920s jazz standards
