= Dziarma =

- Born: Agata Dziarmagowska; 25 August 1997 (age 29); Ostrowiec Świętokrzyski, Poland
- Genres: Pop, hip-hop, witch house, vaporwave
- Occupations: Singer, songwriter, rapper
- Years active: 2011–present
- Label: Warner Music Poland

Agata Dziarmagowska (born 25 August 1997), known by her stage name Dziarma (often stylized in all caps) is a Polish singer, creating music that combines pop, hip-hop and witch house.

== Career ==
In 2012 she made herself known to the public by taking part in the TVN show Mam talent! She reached the semi-finals stage. Then she participated in auditions for talent-show X-Factor. At the casting for the show she presented the song "Billionaire" by Travie McCoy and Bruno Mars, in which she showed not only her vocal talent, but also the ability to rap, which distinguished her from other participants. In the next stage of the program she performed Michael Jackson's hit "Billie Jean", however, by Ewa Farna's decision she dropped out at the stage of jury's houses. After participating in the X-Factor program, she signed a contract with Warner Music Poland and released her first single "Mogę wszystko, nic nie muszę". Her next single was the song "Blisko mnie", which reached gold album status in 2017.

On 30 May 2015, she was one of the main stars at the Young Stars Festival in Poznań, Poland and received the Young Stars Awards in the "debut of the year" category. In 2015 she was also nominated for the Eska Music Awards 2015 in the category "best radio debut". At the gala in Szczecin she sang two songs: "Lean On" and "President".

In June 2016, she released the single "Incomplete" and a music video, which heralded the singer's image transformation. On 9 May 2017 she released the song "Kawaii", for which she produced a music video. Her next single "Coolaid" was released on 12 July 2018. In August 2018, she made a guest appearance on Adi Nowak's track titled "Placebo", which is the third single promoting his album titled Kosh. Barvinsky and production duo Up&Down were responsible for producing the track. In December 2019, she released her debut minialbum V, which features 5 tracks. Her debut self-titled album was released on 10 December 2021, and was critically acclaimed. It peaked at 13 on Polish OLiS chart.

== Discography ==
=== Albums ===
Year	Album details	Peak chart position
Year	Album details	POL
2021	Dziarma: Released: 10 December 2021; Label: 2020; Format: CD, digital download	13

=== EPs ===
Year	EP details
2019	V: Released 18 December 2019; Label: 2020; Format: CD, digital download

=== Singles ===
Year	Title	Certificates	Sales	Album
2014	"Mogę wszystko, nic nie muszę"			–
2014	"Drop, drop"			–
2015	"Blisko mnie"	POL: Gold	POL: 10 000+	–
2015	"President"			–
2016	"Incomplete"			–
2017	"Kawai"			–
2018	"Coolaid"			–
2019	"Plik"			V
2021	"Czarny bez"			Dziarma
2021	"Drzazga" (featuring Hodak)			Dziarma
2021	"Bomby" (featuring Szpaku)			Dziarma
2021	"Pinokio"			Dziarma
2021	"Cake" (featuring Kizo)			Dziarma

=== Guest appearances ===
Year	Title	Certificates	Sales	Album
2019	"Ucieknij ze mną" (Żabson, featuring Dziarma)			Internaziomal
2018	"Placebo" (Adi Nowak, featuring Dziarma)	POL: Platinum	POL: 20 000+	Kosh
2020	"Tak bardzo" (OKI, featuring Dziarma)			77747mixtape
2021	"Wino" (Szpaku, featuring Dziarma)	POL: Gold	POL: 10 000+	Różowa pantera
2021	"Nieważne" (Hodak and 2K, featuring Dziarma)			Moody Tapes, Volume One

== Awards and nominations ==
Year	Award	Category	Result	Ref.
2015	Young Stars Awards 2015	Debut of The Year	Won	
2015	Eska Music Awards 2015	Best Radio Debut	Nominee	
