= Tempo (Margaret song) =

2019 single by Margaret

Single by Margaret
- Released: 9 February 2019
- Recorded: 2018
- Genre: Pop
- Length: 2:49
- Label: Powerhouse; Warner
- Songwriter(s): Anderz Wrethov; Jimmy Jansson; Laurell Barker; Sebastian von Koenigsegg

Margaret singles chronology
"Błogość" (2019)	"Tempo" (2019)	"Gaja Hornby" (2019)

"Tempo" is a song by Polish singer Margaret. It was written by Anderz Wrethov, Jimmy Jansson, Laurell Barker and Sebastian von Koenigsegg. The song was released on 9 February 2019 by Powerhouse and Warner Music.

On 27 November 2018, Swedish broadcaster Sveriges Television (SVT) announced that Margaret was one of the artists taking part in Melodifestivalen 2019, Sweden's national selection for Eurovision Song Contest 2019, with "Tempo". She placed fifth in the second semi-final of the competition which took place on 9 February 2019 in Malmö Arena, and was subsequently eliminated. The single charted in the top 10 in Poland and in the top 50 in Sweden.

Live recording of "Tempo" from Margaret's MTV Unplugged concert special was released on its accompanying live album in 2023.

== Music video ==
"Tempo" has two music videos labelled "Up" and "Down" which make one music video when put together on two separate mobile devices with the device on top playing the "Up" version of the video and the device below playing the "Down" version at the same time. Both versions, directed by Maciej Bieliński, were released on 25 April 2019.

== Accolades ==
Accolades for "Tempo"
Year	Ceremony	Category	Result	Ref.
2020	Fryderyk	Audience Award	Nominated	

== Charts ==
=== Weekly charts ===
Weekly chart performance for "Tempo"
Chart (2019)	Peak position
Poland (Polish Airplay Top 100)	7
Sweden (Sverigetopplistan)	43

=== Year-end charts ===
Year-end chart performance for "Tempo"
Chart (2019)	Position
Poland (Airplay 2019)	49

== Release history ==
Release history and formats for "Tempo"
Region	Date	Format	Label	Ref.
Various	9 February 2019	Digital download; streaming	Powerhouse; Warner Music	
