= Oki (rapper) =

Polish rapper

- Also known as: Oki
- Born: Oskar Kamiński; 1998 (age 27–28); Lubin, Poland
- Genre: Hip-hop
- Occupations: Rapper; singer; songwriter
- Years active: 2013–present
- Label: 2020

Oskar Kamiński (born 1998), known professionally as Oki, is a Polish rapper, singer and songwriter.

== Music career ==
The rapper started releasing his first tracks back in 2013 on his YouTube channel. His first album Szanuj EP in collaboration with Mongoł was released in May 2014. He formed a duo with Girson called Microphone Killah. On 19 April 2015 their collaborative project, Microphone Killah Mixtape, hit the web. While on December 28 of the same year, Oki uploaded his solo C.R.E.A.M Mixtape.

He gained his first wave of popularity in March 2018 with the release of the album Oki & Nearr based on productions by Polish producer Nearr. In 2019, he released 47universe album and in 2020, he released 47playground, which featured guest appearances by Paluch, Szpaku, Gedz and ZetHa. That same year, Kamiński also released a mixtape titled 77747 Mixtape. It is certified gold.

In March 2021, he formed the OIO band with Otsochodzi and Young Igi. Later that year, in May, the album OIO was released. It is certified double platinum.

On 9 June 2022, he released an album titled PRODUKT47 with guest features from Young Igi and Taco Hemingway.

== Discography ==
=== Albums ===
- Oki & Nearr (2018)
- 47universe (2019)
- 47plaground (2020)
- OIO (with Young Igi and Otsochodzi as OIO) (2021), ZPAV: 2× Platinum
- Produkt47 (2022) ZPAV: 2× Platinum
- Era47 (2024)
- Reklamacja'47 (2026)

=== EPs ===
- Szanuj EP (with Mongoł) (2014)

=== Mixtapes ===
- Microphone Killah Mixtape (with Girson) (2015)
- C.R.E.A.M. Mixtape (2015)
- 77747 Mixtape (2020), ZPAV: Gold
- 47REMIX PACK (2020)

=== Notable singles ===
- "Whoop?" (2018), ZPAV: Gold
- "Koła" (2019), ZPAV: Gold
- "Justin Bieber" (2019), ZPAV: Gold
- "SIRI" (featuring Gedz) (2020), ZPAV: Platinum
- "Jeżyk!" (2022), ZPAV: 2xPlatinum
- "Jakie to uczucie" (2022), ZPAV: 2xPlatinum
- "Pieniądze, dziewczyny, zwrotki" (2022), ZPAV: Platinum
- "Dzielny pacjent" (2022), ZPAV: Platinum
- "I to jest fakt" (2022), ZPAV: Gold
- "Sonic (skit)" (2022), ZPAV: Platinum
- "ADHD" (featuring Taco Hemingway) (2022), ZPAV: Gold
- "Doja Cat" (2022), ZPAV: Platinum
- "Sprzedałem się" (2023), ZPAV: Gold
- "WODA SODOWA" (2024)
- my love featuring MGK (2026)
