= Young Igi =

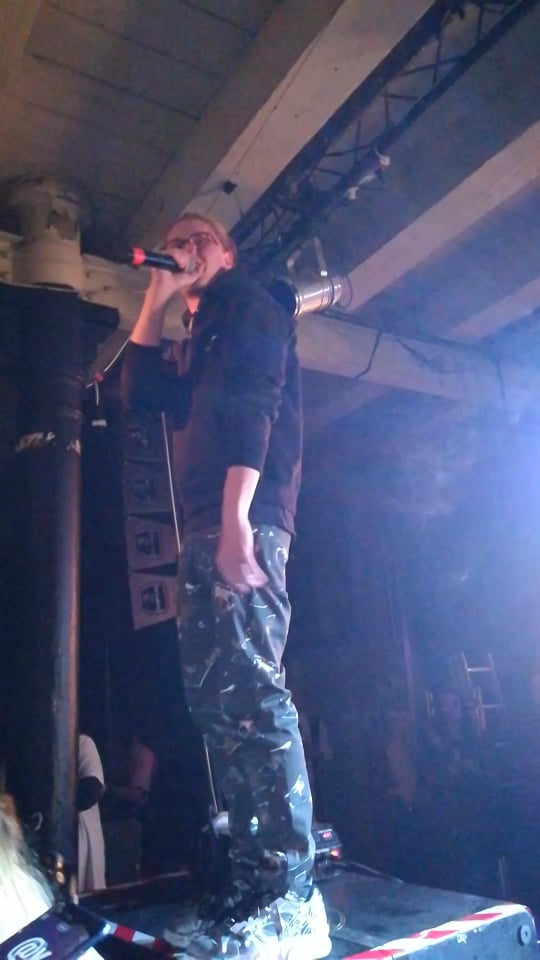
- Young Igi (2019)

Background information
- Born: Igor Ośmiałowski; November 17, 1999 (age 26)
- Genres: Hip hop; trap
- Years active: 2016–present
- Label: Def Jam Poland

Igor Ośmiałowski (born 17 November 1999), known professionally as Young Igi, is a Polish rapper and songwriter. He has collaborated with such artists as Quebonafide, Margaret, and Malik Montana. Together with Otsochodzi and Oki, he is a member of the trio OIO.

On October 19, 2018, he released his first official album Konfetti. The album reached the 6th place on the Polish sales list - OLiS.

One of his albums is certified double platinum, 3 albums gold, 1 single diamond, 2 singles double platinum, 6 singles platinum, and 15 singles gold.

== Discography ==
=== Studio albums ===
- Konfetti (2018), POL: gold
- Skan myśli (2019), POL: gold
- Notatki z marginesu (2022)

=== Mixtapes ===
- Trappist (2017)
- !G! Tape #1 (2019)

=== Collaborative albums ===
- OIO (with Otsochodzi and Oki as OIO) (2021), POL: 2× platinum
- Amfisbena (with Żabson) (2022), POL: gold
