= Kroll (surname) =

Kroll or Kröll is a German, Anglo-Saxon, and Scottish surname.

Notable people with the surname include:

== Academia ==
- Josef Kroll (1889–1980), German classical philologist and university rector
- Judith F. Kroll, American college professor in California
- Wilhelm Kroll (1869–1939), German philologist

== Entertainment ==
- Jack Kroll (c. 1928 – 2000), American drama and film critic
- Leon Kroll (1884–1974), American painter
- Lucy Kroll (1909–1997), American theatrical and literary agent
- Natasha Kroll (1914–2004), Moscow-born display and production designer in Germany
- Nick Kroll (born 1978), American actor and comedian, son of Jules
- William Kroll (1901–1980), American violinist and composer

== Religion ==
- Leopold Kroll (1874–1946), missionary bishop of the Missionary District of Liberia
- Una Kroll (1925–2017), British nun, missionary doctor, and campaigner for women's ordination
- Woodrow M. Kroll (born 1944), American evangelist, principal of the Back to the Bible radio ministry

== Science ==
- Kristen Kroll (born c. 1967), American developmental and stem cell biologist
- Norman Myles Kroll (1922–2004), American theoretical physicist
- William Justin Kroll (1889–1973), Luxemburger metallurgist, inventor of the Kroll process
- Wolfgang Kroll (1906–1992), German physicist

== Sports ==
- Alex Kroll (1937–2024), American football player and advertising agency executive
- Bob Kroll (American football) (born 1950), American football player
- Gary Kroll (born 1941), American baseball player
- Klaus Kröll (born 1980), Austrian alpine ski racer
- Paul Kroll, American boxer
- Richard Kröll (1968–1996), Austrian alpine skier
- Robert Kroll (born 1972), German tennis player
- Steve Kroll (born 1997), German footballer
- Sylvio Kroll (born 1965), German gymnast
- Ted Kroll (1919–2002), American golfer
- Valentina Kröll (born 2002), Austrian footballer

== Writing ==
- Fredric Kroll (1945–2026), American-German composer, writer and editor
- Harry Harrison Kroll (1888–1967), American writer, illustrator and English professor
- Jon Kroll, American producer, director, and writer
- Pierre Kroll (born 1958), Belgian cartoonist and caricaturist
- Steven Kroll (1941–2011), American children's book author

== Other ==
- Bob Kroll (police officer) (born c. 1965), American police officer in Minneapolis
- Colin Kroll (1984–2018), American businessman
- Eric Kroll (born 1946), American photographer
- Fred J. Kroll (1935–1981), American labor union leader
- Hans Kroll (1898–1967), German diplomat
- Heinrich Kroll (1894-1930), German World War I flying ace
- Henryk Kroll (born 1949), Polish politician, leader of German minority in Poland
- Jack Kroll (labor leader) (1885–1971), London-born American labor leader
- Joachim Kroll (1933–1991), German serial killer
- Jules Kroll (born 1941), American businessman widely credited with founding the modern corporate investigations industry
- Lucien Kroll (1927–2022), Belgian architect
- Nicholas Kroll (born 1954), British civil servant

== See also ==
- Krol
- Kroll (disambiguation)
- Croll
