= Östersjöfestivalen =

International song competition

Östersjöfestivalen or Baltic Song Contest is an annual song contest held for the states along the Baltic Sea. The annual host city is Karlshamn in Sweden. The first contest was held in 1978.

| Year | Date | Host | Winner | Runner up | Third place | Prizes |
|---|---|---|---|---|---|---|
| 1978 | - | - | Sweden Zeid Andersson | - | - | - |
| 1979 | - | - | Poland Maria Jeżowska | - | - | - |
| 1980 | 1980-07-19 | - | Poland Magdalena Zawadzka | - | - | - |
| 1981 | 1981-07-18 | - | Poland Ewa Morawska | - | - | - |
| 1982 | 1982-07-24 | - | Poland Krystyna Giżowska | - | - | - |
| 1983 | 1983-07-23 | - | Soviet Union Irina Otieva | - | - | - |
| 1984 | 1984-07-21 | - | Denmark Anne Karin Andersen | - | - | - |
| 1985 | 1985-07-20 | - | Poland Hanna Banaszak | - | - | - |
| 1986 | 1986-07-19 | - | Poland Beata Kozidrak | - | - | - |
| 1987 | 1987-07-18 | - | Poland Małgorzata Ostrowska | Denmark Kirsten & Sören | Sweden Charlotte Ardai | - |
| 1988 | 1988-07-23 | Bengt Grafström | Sweden Britt Dahlén | Soviet Union Marina Kapuro | West Germany Art Affairs | - |
| 1989 | 1989-07-22 | - | United Kingdom Sadine Nine | West Germany Sebastian Schimmelpfennig | East Germany Anett Kölpin | - |
| 1990 | 1990-07-21 | Bengt Grafström | Austria Etta Scolo | Denmark Lonnie Devantier | Sweden Tove Jaarnek | - |
| 1991 | 1991-07-20 | Bengt Grafström | Germany David Hanselman | United Kingdom Dana Gillespie | Austria Gary Lux & Shirley Giha | - |
| 1992 | 1992-07-18 | Bengt Grafström | Sweden Peter Jöback | Austria Opus | Finland Marjorie | - |
| 1993 | 1993-07-24 | Bengt Grafström | The Netherlands Chris Irvine | Austria Lele | Poland Edyta Górniak | - |
| 1994 | 1994-07-23 | Bengt Grafström | Norway Madam Medusa | Poland Kayah | Ireland Darren Holden | - |
| 1995 | 1995-07-22 | Bengt Grafström | Poland Justyna Steczkowska | Austria Joni Madden | Sweden Paris Klingberg | - |
| 1996 | 1996-07-20 | Bengt Grafström | United Kingdom Holli C. Hooks | Poland Robert Gawliński | Russia Igor Nadjiev | - |
| 1997 | 1997-07-19 | Bengt Grafström | Lithuania Rosita Civilyte | Russia Oksana Galitskaja | Poland Natalia Kukulska | - |
| 1998 | 1998-07-18 | Bengt Grafström | Latvia Brainstorm | Norway Marianne Antonsen | Sweden Crosstalk | - |
| 1999 | 1999-07-24 | Bengt Grafström | Sweden Anna Stadling | Poland Andrzej Piaseczny | Latvia Arnis Mednis | - |
| 2000 | 2000-07-22 | Bengt Grafström | Latvia Little Gunnar | Russia Soso Pavliachvili | Poland Brathanki | - |
| 2001 | 2001-07-21 | Bengt Grafström | Poland Ich Troje | United Kingdom Danny Lichfield | USA Marvin Ruffin | - |
| 2002 | 2002-07-20 | Ola Lindholm | Poland Varius Manx | Sweden Nanne Grönvall | Italy Daniele Vit | - |
| 2003 | 2003-07-19 | Ola Lindholm | Sweden Aleena | Latvia F.L.Y. | Austria Baghira | - |
| 2004 | 2004-07-17 | Ola Lindholm | Sweden Sandra Dahlberg | Norway Gil Bonden | Sweden Niklas Andersson | - |
| 2005 | 2005-07-23 | Ola Lindholm | United Kingdom Rob Reynolds | Latvia Putnu Balle | Italy Jalisse | - |
| 2006 | 2006-07-22 | Tina Leijonberg | Poland Kasia Cerekwicka | Sweden Andersson & Gibson | Italy Falzone | - |
| 2007 | 2007-07-21 | Tina Leijonberg | Lithuania Jurga | Poland Patrycja Markowska | Estonia Maarja | - |
| 2008 | 2008-07-19 | Tina Leijonberg | Sweden LaGaylia Frazier | Sweden Caroline Larsson | Poland Ewelina Flinta & Łukasz Zagrobelny | - |
| 2009 | 2009-07-18 | Anders Jönsson | Switzerland IVO | Lithuania Zivile Ba | Sweden Jan Johansen | - |
| 2010 | 2010-07-24 | Anders Jönsson | Latvia Aisha | Estonia Birgit Õigemeel | Russia Andrew Solodkiy | Public prise: Sweden Molly Sandén |
| 2011 | 2011-07-23 | Anders Jönsson | Norway Diskotek | Sweden Savbrant Ingrid Band | Sweden Py Bäckman | - |
| 2012 | 2012-07-21 | Anders Jönsson | Poland Piotr Kupicha & Marcin Kindla | Switzerland 77 Bombay Street | Austria Michael Watter | Public prise: Switzerland 77 Bombay Street |
| 2013 | 2013-07-20 | Anders Jönsson | Sweden Tove Jaarnek | Poland Margaret | Sweden Miriam Bryant | Public prise: Sweden Miriam Bryant |
| 2014 | 2014-07-19 | Anders Jönsson & Anna-Lena Petersson | Poland Stashka | Sweden Caroline Wennergren | Sweden Alien | Public prise: Poland Stashka |
| 2015 | 2015-07-18 | Thomas Deutgen | Spain Gerson Galván | Ireland Janet Devlin | Belarus Janet | Public prise: Poland Sarsa |
| 2016 | 2016-07-23 | Thomas Deutgen | Norway Adam Douglas | Spain Maika Barbero | Croatia Antonela Doko | Public prise: Moldova Doinita Gherman |

== List of Countries ==
- Austria
- Belarus
- Denmark
- East Germany
- Estonia
- Finland
- Germany
- Ireland
- Italy
- Latvia
- Lithuania
- Luxembourg
- Macedonia
- Montenegro
- The Netherlands
- Norway
- Poland
- Slovakia
- Spain
- Sweden
- Switzerland
- Ukraine
- United Kingdom
- USA
- Soviet Union
- West Germany

== Wins ==
| Wins | Country |
|---|---|
| 13 | Poland |
| 8 | Sweden |
| 3 | United Kingdom |
| 3 | Latvia |
| 3 | Norway |
| 2 | Lithuania |
| 1 | Spain |
| 1 | Austria |
| 1 | Switzerland |
| 1 | West Germany |
| 1 | Denmark |
| 1 | Soviet Union |
| 1 | The Netherlands |
