= KAT7 (gene) =

Protein-coding gene in the species Homo sapiens

Identifiers
- Aliases: KAT7, HBO1, HBOA, MYST2, ZC2HC7, lysine acetyltransferase 7
- External IDs: OMIM: 609880; MGI: 2182799; GeneCards: KAT7
Enzyme activity
EC #	BRENDA	ExPASy	KEGG	MetaCyc
2.3.1.48	↗	↗	↗	↗

Gene location (Human)
Chr.	Chromosome 17 (human)
Band	17q21.33	Start	49,788,648 bp
Band	17q21.33	End	49,835,026 bp

Gene location (Mouse)
Chr.	Chromosome 11 (mouse)
Band	11|11 D	Start	95,165,085 bp
Band	11|11 D	End	95,201,072 bp
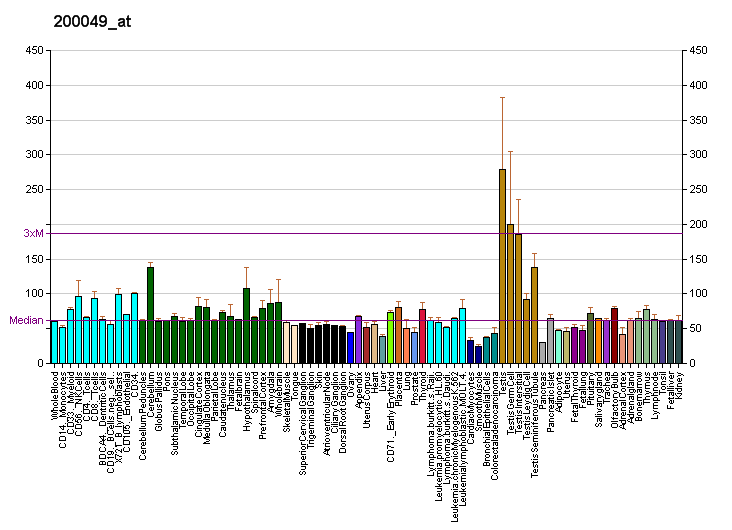
RNA expression pattern
Bgee	Human / Mouse (ortholog); Top expressed in: sural nerve; testicle; left testis; Achilles tendon; right testis; ventricular zone; gonad; epithelium of colon; popliteal artery; tibial arteries / Top expressed in: spermatocyte; ankle joint; Rostral migratory stream; zygote; spermatid; secondary oocyte; seminiferous tubule; tail of embryo; cumulus cell; granulocyte; More reference expression data
BioGPS	More reference expression data
Gene ontology
Molecular function	transferase activity; DNA-binding transcription factor activity; zinc ion binding; metal ion binding; histone acetyltransferase activity; protein binding; acyltransferase activity; DNA replication origin binding; DNA-binding transcription factor activity, RNA polymerase II-specific; H4 histone acetyltransferase activity; histone binding
Cellular component	nucleoplasm; nucleolus; histone acetyltransferase complex; nucleus; cytoplasm; cytosol
Biological process	regulation of transcription, DNA-templated; transcription, DNA-templated; histone H4-K5 acetylation; DNA replication; histone H3 acetylation; histone H4-K16 acetylation; histone H4-K8 acetylation; histone H4-K12 acetylation; positive regulation of protein localization to nucleus; stress-activated protein kinase signaling cascade; positive regulation of transcription by RNA polymerase II; response to sorbitol; response to hydroxyurea; response to actinomycin D; response to dithiothreitol; response to anisomycin; positive regulation of histone H4 acetylation; histone acetylation; chromatin organization; negative regulation of transcription, DNA-templated; internal peptidyl-lysine acetylation
Sources:Amigo / QuickGO
Orthologs
Databases	NCBI: entry; OMA: entry
Species	Human	Mouse
Entrez	11143	217127
Ensembl	ENSG00000136504	ENSMUSG00000038909
UniProt	O95251	Q5SVQ0
RefSeq (mRNA)	NM_001199155; NM_001199156; NM_001199157; NM_001199158; NM_007067 NM_001346706	NM_001195003; NM_001195004; NM_177619
RefSeq (protein)	NP_001186084; NP_001186085; NP_001186086; NP_001186087; NP_001333635 NP_008998	NP_001181932; NP_001181933; NP_808287; NP_001392123; NP_001392124 NP_001392125; NP_001392126; NP_001392127; NP_001392128; NP_001392129; NP_001392130; NP_001392131; NP_001392132; NP_001392133; NP_001392134; NP_001392135; NP_001392136; NP_001392137; NP_001392138; NP_001392139; NP_001392140; NP_001392141; NP_001392142; NP_001392143; NP_001392144; NP_001392145; NP_001392146; NP_001392147; NP_001392148; NP_001392149; NP_001392150; NP_001392151; NP_001392152; NP_001392153; NP_001392154; NP_001392155; NP_001392156
Location (UCSC)	Chr 17: 49.79 – 49.84 Mb	Chr 11: 95.17 – 95.2 Mb
PubMed search
- Wikidata
View/Edit Human	View/Edit Mouse

Histone acetyltransferase KAT7 is an enzyme that in humans is encoded by the KAT7 gene. It specifically acetylates H4 histones at the lysine12 residue (H4K12) and is necessary for origin licensing and DNA replication. KAT7 associates with origins of replication during G1 phase of the cell cycle through complexing with CDT1. Geminin is thought to inhibit the acetyltransferase activity of KAT7 when KAT7 and CDT1 are complexed together.

== Interactions ==
KAT7 has been shown to interact with:

- AR,
- CDT1,
- MCM2
- ORC1L and
- VIM,
