= Knull (disambiguation) =

Knull is a supervillain appearing in Marvel Comics.

Knull may also refer to:

- The Knüllgebirge, or simply Knüll, a mountain range in Hesse, Germany
- Knull, Idaho, an unincorporated community in Twin Falls County, Idaho, United States

== See also ==
- Null (disambiguation)
- Kull (disambiguation)
- Krull (disambiguation)
- Knoll (disambiguation)
