= Endoreduplication =

Replication of the nuclear genome without mitosis

Endoreduplication (also referred to as endoreplication or endocycling) is replication of the nuclear genome in the absence of mitosis, which leads to elevated nuclear gene content and polyploidy. Endoreduplication can be understood simply as a variant form of the mitotic cell cycle (G1-S-G2-M) in which mitosis is circumvented entirely, due to modulation of cyclin-dependent kinase (CDK) activity. Examples of endoreduplication characterised in arthropod, mammalian, and plant species suggest that it is a universal developmental mechanism responsible for the differentiation and morphogenesis of cell types that fulfill an array of biological functions. While endoreduplication is often limited to specific cell types in animals, it is considerably more widespread in plants, such that polyploidy can be detected in the majority of plant tissues. Polyploidy and aneuploidy are common phenomena in cancer cells. Given that oncogenesis and endoreduplication likely involve subversion of common cell cycle regulatory mechanisms, a thorough understanding of endoreduplication may provide important insights for cancer biology.

== Examples in nature ==
Endoreduplicating cell types that have been studied extensively in model organisms

Organism	Name	Cell type	Biological function	Citation
fly	Drosophilia Melanogaster	larval tissues (incl. salivary glands)	secretion, embryogenesis	
fly	Drosophilia Melanogaster	ovarian follicle, nurse cells	nourishment, protection of oocytes	
rodent		megakaryocyte	platelet formation	
rodent		hepatocyte	regeneration	
rodent		trophoblast giant cell	placental development, nourishment of embryo	
plant	Arabidopsis Thaliana	trichome	defense from herbivory, homeostasis	
plant	Arabidopsis Thaliana	leaf epidermal cell	leaf size, structure	
plant	Arabidopsis Thaliana	endosperm	nourishment of embryo	
nematode	Caenorhabditis elegans	hypodermis	secretion, body size	
nematode	Caenorhabditis elegans	intestine	unknown	

== Endoreduplication, endomitosis and polytenization ==
Endoreduplication, endomitosis and polytenization are three different processes resulting in polyploidization of a cell in a regulated manner. In endoreduplication cells skip M phase completely by exiting the mitotic cell cycle in the G_{2} phase after completing the S phase several times, resulting in a mononucleated polyploid cell. The cell ends up with twice as many copies of each chromosome per repeat of the S phase. Endomitosis is a type of cell cycle variation where mitosis is initiated, but stopped during anaphase and thus cytokinesis is not completed. The cell ends up with multiple nuclei in contrast to a cell undergoing endoreduplication. Therefore, depending on how far the cell progresses through mitosis, this will give rise to a mononucleated or binucleated polyploid cell. Polytenization arises with under- or overamplification of some genomic regions, creating polytene chromosomes.

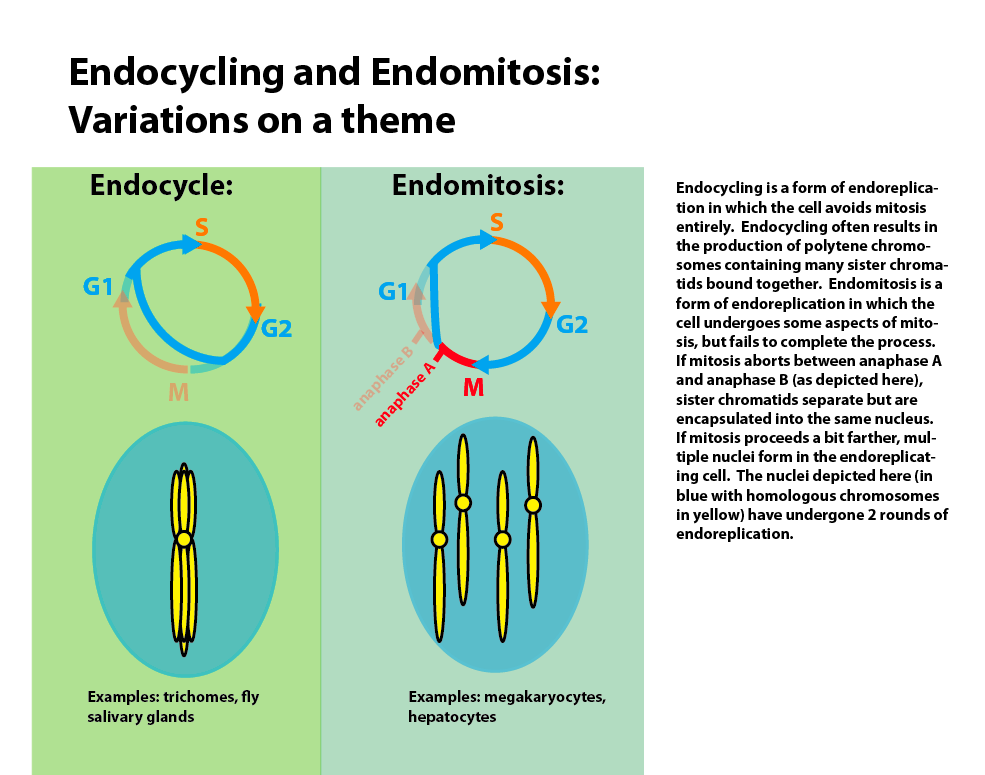
Endocycling vs. endomitosis

== Biological significance ==
Based on the wide array of cell types in which endoreduplication occurs, a variety of hypotheses have been generated to explain the functional importance of this phenomenon. Unfortunately, experimental evidence to support these conclusions is somewhat limited.

=== Cell differentiation ===
In developing plant tissues the transition from mitosis to endoreduplication often coincides with cell differentiation and morphogenesis. However it remains to be determined whether endoreduplication and polyploidy contribute to cell differentiation or vice versa. Targeted inhibition of endoreduplication in trichome progenitors results in the production of multicellular trichomes that exhibit relatively normal morphology, but ultimately dedifferentiate and undergo absorption into the leaf epidermis. This result suggests that endoreduplication and polyploidy may be required for the maintenance of cell identity.

=== Cell/organism size ===
Cell ploidy often correlates with cell size, and in some instances, disruption of endoreduplication results in diminished cell and tissue size suggesting that endoreduplication may serve as a mechanism for tissue growth. Relative to mitosis, endoreduplication does not require cytoskeletal rearrangement or the production of new cell membrane and it often occurs in cells that have already differentiated. As such it may represent an energetically efficient alternative to cell proliferation among differentiated cell types that can no longer afford to undergo mitosis. While evidence establishing a connection between ploidy and tissue size is prevalent in the literature, contrary examples also exist.

=== Oogenesis and embryonic development ===
Endoreduplication is commonly observed in cells responsible for the nourishment and protection of oocytes and embryos. It has been suggested that increased gene copy number might allow for the mass production of proteins required to meet the metabolic demands of embryogenesis and early development. Consistent with this notion, mutation of the Myc oncogene in Drosophila follicle cells results in reduced endoreduplication and abortive oogenesis. However, reduction of endoreduplication in maize endosperm has limited effect on the accumulation of starch and storage proteins, suggesting that the nutritional requirements of the developing embryo may involve the nucleotides that comprise the polyploid genome rather than the proteins it encodes.

=== Buffering the genome ===
Another hypothesis is that endoreduplication buffers against DNA damage and mutation because it provides extra copies of important genes. However, this notion is purely speculative and there is limited evidence to the contrary. For example, analysis of polyploid yeast strains suggests that they are more sensitive to radiation than diploid strains.

=== Stress response ===
Research in plants suggests that endoreduplication may also play a role in modulating stress responses. By manipulating expression of E2fe (a repressor of endocycling in plants), researchers were able to demonstrate that increased cell ploidy lessens the negative impact of drought stress on leaf size. Given that the sessile lifestyle of plants necessitates a capacity to adapt to environmental conditions, it is appealing to speculate that widespread polyploidization contributes to their developmental plasticity

== Genetic control of endoreplication ==
The best-studied example of a mitosis-to-endoreduplication transition occurs in Drosophila follicle cells and is activated by Notch signaling. Entry into endoreduplication involves modulation of mitotic and S-phase cyclin-dependent kinase (CDK) activity. Inhibition of M-phase CDK activity is accomplished via transcriptional activation of Cdh/fzr and repression of the G2-M regulator string/cdc25. Cdh/fzr is responsible for activation of the anaphase-promoting complex (APC) and subsequent proteolysis of the mitotic cyclins. String/cdc25 is a phosphatase that stimulates mitotic cyclin-CDK complex activity. Upregulation of S-phase CDK activity is accomplished via transcriptional repression of the inhibitory kinase dacapo. Together, these changes allow for the circumvention of mitotic entry, progression through G1, and entry into S-phase. The induction of endomitosis in mammalian megakaryocytes involves activation of the c-mpl receptor by the thrombopoietin (TPO) cytokine and is mediated by ERK1/2 signaling. As with Drosophila follicle cells, endoreduplication in megakaryocytes results from activation of S-phase cyclin-CDK complexes and inhibition of mitotic cyclin-CDK activity.

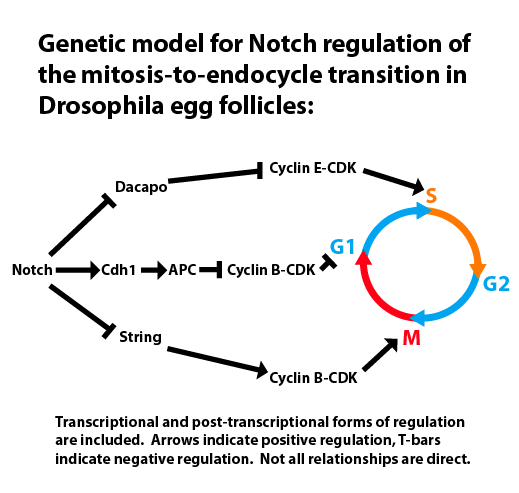
Notch regulation of endocycling

Entry into S-phase during endoreduplication (and mitosis) is regulated through the formation of a prereplicative complex (pre-RC) at replication origins, followed by recruitment and activation of the DNA replication machinery. In the context of endoreduplication these events are facilitated by an oscillation in cyclin E-Cdk2 activity. Cyclin E-Cdk2 activity drives the recruitment and activation of the replication machinery, but it also inhibits pre-RC formation, presumably to ensure that only one round of replication occurs per cycle. Failure to maintain control over pre-RC formation at replication origins results in a phenomenon known as "rereplication" which is common in cancer cells. The mechanism by which cyclin E-Cdk2 inhibits pre-RC formation involves downregulation of APC-Cdh1-mediated proteolysis and accumulation of the protein Geminin, which is responsible for sequestration of the pre-RC component Cdt1.

Oscillations in Cyclin E-Cdk2 activity are modulated via transcriptional and post-transcriptional mechanisms. Expression of cyclin E is activated by E2F transcription factors that were shown to be required for endoreduplication. Recent work suggests that observed oscillations in E2F and cyclin E protein levels result from a negative-feedback loop involving Cul4-dependent ubiquitination and degradation of E2F. Post-transcriptional regulation of cyclin E-Cdk2 activity involves Ago/Fbw7-mediated proteolytic degradation of cyclin E and direct inhibition by factors such as Dacapo and p57.

== Premeiotic endomitosis in unisexual vertebrates ==
The unisexual salamanders (genus Ambystoma) are the oldest known unisexual vertebrate lineage, having arisen about 5 million years ago. In these polyploid unisexual females, an extra premeiotic endomitotic replication of the genome, doubles the number of chromosomes. As a result, the mature eggs that are produced subsequent to the two meiotic divisions have the same ploidy as the somatic cells of the adult female salamander. Synapsis and recombination during meiotic prophase I in these unisexual females is thought to ordinarily occur between identical sister chromosomes and occasionally between homologous chromosomes. Thus little, if any, genetic variation is produced. Recombination between homeologous chromosomes occurs rarely, if at all.
