= Croll =

Croll is a surname. Notable people with the surname include:

- Alexander Angus Croll, (1811–1887), British civil engineer
- Dan Croll (born 1990), British singer-songwriter
- David Croll (1900–1991), Canadian politician
- Doña Croll (born 1953), Jamaican-born British actress
- Hacker Croll, real name François Cousteix, French computer hacker
- James Croll (1821–1890), Scottish scientist who developed a theory of climate change
- Jimmy Croll (1920–2008), American race horse trainer
- Joan Croll (1928–2022), Australian physician and radiologist
- June Croll (1901–1967), American labor organizer
- Maria de Croll (died 1710), Swedish vocalist
- Oswald Croll or Crollius (c. 1563–1609), German physician, alchemist and botanist
- Sebastian Croll, 17th-century Dutchman who introduced the cruller to the Americas
- William Martin Croll (1866–1929), American politician from Pennsylvania

== In other uses ==
- Croll Building in Alameda, California
- Petzl Croll rope ascending device
- Croll Glacier a glacier in Antarctica

== See also ==
- Kroll
