= Krol =

Krol is a surname of several possible origins.

It may be a Dutch surname. It originally was a nickname of someone with curly hair (krul still means "curl" in Modern Dutch).

The name may also be a direct translation stemming from a version of the Polish surname Król, the Belarusian/Ukrainian surname Krol', both literally translated to English is "King".

== Krol ==
- Bernhard Krol (1920–2015), German horn player and composer
- Ed Krol (born 1951), American internet pioneer and technology writer
- George A. Krol (born 1956), American diplomat
- Gerrit Krol (1934–2013), Dutch author, essayist and writer
- Gerrit Krol (politician) (born 1945), Dutch politician
- Henk Krol (born 1950), Dutch journalist, publisher, and politician
- Ian Krol (born 1991), American baseball pitcher
- Jack Krol (1936–1994), American baseball coach and manager
- Joe Krol (1915–1993), Canadian ice hockey player
- Joe Krol (1919–2008), Canadian football player
- John Krol (1910–1996), American Catholic cardinal
- Katharine L. Krol, American radiologist
- Leendert Krol (born 1939), Dutch field hockey player
- Melvin Krol (born 1998), German football player
- Mike Krol (born 1984), American musician and graphic designer
- Petr Krol (born 1965), Czech weightlifter
- Petra Krol (fl. 1970s), East German slalom canoeist
- Ruud Krol (born 1949), Dutch football player and coach
- Sebastiaen Jansen Krol (1595–1674), Dutch Director-General of New Netherland
- Thomas Krol (born 1992), Dutch speed skater
- Torsten Krol, Australian novelist

== Król ==
Król (Polish pronunciation: [krul]) is a Polish surname meaning "king" and may refer to:

- Aleksandra Król (born 1990), Polish snowboarder
- Artur Król (born 1983), Polish racing cyclist
- Jan Król (born 1950), Polish economist and politician
- Joachim Król (born 1957), German actor
- Kamil Król (born 1987), Polish football player
- Krzysztof Król (born 1987), Polish football player
- Marcin Król z Żurawicy (c. 1422–1460), Polish mathematician, astronomer, and physician
- Paweł Król (born 1960), Polish football player
- Piotr Marek Król (born 1974), Polish politician
- Rafał Król (born 1989), Polish football player
- Stanisław Król (1916–1944), Polish fighter pilot
- Wacław Król (1915–1991), Polish military pilot
- Wiesław Król (born 1938), Polish hurdler
- Władysław Król (1907–1991), Polish football and ice hockey player
- Zdzisław Król (1935–2010), Polish Catholic priest
- Jolanta Wadowska-Król (1939–2023), Polish pediatrician

== Krol' ==
- Michail Krol' (1879–1939), Soviet Belarusian neurologist
- Moisej Aaronovič Krol' (1862–1942), Ukrainian-Russian ethnologue, publisher and jurist

== See also ==
- Kroll
- Krol Ko at Angkor, Cambodia
- Krul
