= Krulak =

Krulak is a surname. Notable people with the surname include:

- Charles C. Krulak (born 1942), 31st Commandant of the Marine Corps, 1995–1999
- Victor H. Krulak (1913–2008), decorated United States Marine Corps officer

== See also ==
- Krulak Mendenhall mission, fact-finding expedition dispatched by the Kennedy administration to South Vietnam in early September 1963
- Kruklanki
- Krul
- Kulak
