= Geminin coiled-coil domain-containing protein 1 =

GMNC

Identifiers
- Aliases: GMNC, GEMC1, geminin coiled-coil domain containing
- External IDs: OMIM: 614448; MGI: 2685452; GeneCards: GMNC
Available structures
PDB	Ortholog search: PDBe RCSB
PDB	List of PDB id codes 5C9N

Gene location (Human)
Chr.	Chromosome 3 (human)
Band	3q28	Start	190,852,737 bp
Band	3q28	End	190,892,429 bp

Gene location (Mouse)
Chr.	Chromosome 16 (mouse)
Band	16|16 B2	Start	26,732,303 bp
Band	16|16 B2	End	26,810,402 bp
RNA expression pattern
Bgee	Human / Mouse (ortholog); Top expressed in: right uterine tube; testicle; right lobe of liver; left uterine tube; human kidney; smooth muscle tissue; gonad; right testis; endometrium; left testis / Top expressed in: vasculature; vasculature of organ; epithelium of bronchus; dentate gyrus of hippocampal formation granule cell; embryo; hippocampus proper; Epithelium of lobar bronchus; choroid plexus; epiblast; nasal epithelium; More reference expression data
BioGPS	n/a
Gene ontology
Molecular function	chromatin binding
Cellular component	nucleus
Biological process	DNA replication; cell cycle; cell population proliferation; DNA replication initiation; cilium assembly
Sources:Amigo / QuickGO
Orthologs
Databases	NCBI: entry; OMA: entry
Species	Human	Mouse
Entrez	647309	239789
Ensembl	ENSG00000205835	ENSMUSG00000068428
UniProt	A6NCL1	Q3URY2
RefSeq (mRNA)	NM_001146686	NM_001013761; NM_001285916; NM_001285918
RefSeq (protein)	NP_001140158	NP_001013783; NP_001272845; NP_001272847
Location (UCSC)	Chr 3: 190.85 – 190.89 Mb	Chr 16: 26.73 – 26.81 Mb
PubMed search
- Wikidata
View/Edit Human	View/Edit Mouse

Geminin coiled-coil domain-containing protein 1 (GEMC1) is protein which in humans is encoded by the gene GMNC. GEMC1 is a chromatin-binding protein which is part of the Geminin protein family. It is involved in the cell cycle, initiation of DNA replication, cilium assembly, and cell population proliferation. Reduced Generation of Multiple Motile Cilia (RGMC) is a rare ciliopathy characterized by hydrocephalus, the buildup of mucus in the airways, and reduced fertility that can be linked to defective multiple ciliated cell (MCC) differentiation, a process in which GEMC1, MCIDAS (another Geminin family protein), and CCNO are crucial.

== Role in DNA replication ==
GEMC1 promotes the initiation of chromosomal DNA replication by mediating TOPBP1- and CDK2-dependent recruitment of CDC45L onto replication origins.

== Role in ciliogenesis ==
GEMC1 and MCIDAS transcriptionally activate E2F4/5-target genes during multiciliogenesis, including CCNO, which is necessary for the generation of multiple motile cilia.

=== Respiratory tract ===
The airways are lined by MCCs that generate the flow of mucus by beating in a coordinated manner. The downregulation of numerous genes by the Mir449/34 family of miRNAs followed by the activation of a transcriptional program by Geminin family members GEMC1 and MCIDAS is required for the generation of airway MCCs in fish, frogs and mammals.

=== Fertility ===
Male and female infertility has been observed in mice mutant for GEMC1, MCIDAS, or CCNO due to defective MCC differentiation. In females, MCC loss in the oviducts is the probable cause of infertility. The efferent duct epithelia of males contains MCCs that mobilize luminal fluids to prevent the agglutination of spermatozoa and promote fluid reabsorption. In mice mutant for these genes, degeneration of Sertoli cells, thinning of the seminiferous tubule epithelia, dilation of the rete testes and seminiferous tubules, sperm agglutinations in the efferent ducts, and lack of spermatozoa in the epididymis has been observed in conjunction with defects in MCC development.
