= Wild Kids =

Swedish reality show for children

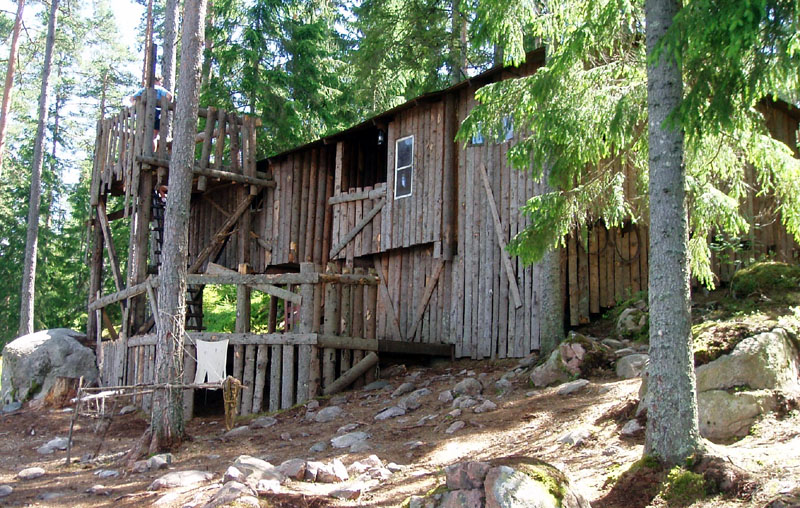
- The home of Björnarna (The Bears), the name of one of the teams in Wild Kids.
- Country of origin: Sweden
- Original language: Swedish

Production
- Executive producer: Caroline Norrby
- Running time: 2005, 2007, 2009, 2010, 2012-2023

Original release
- Network: SVT (2005-2019); TV4 (2020-2023)
- Release: 19 March 2005

Wild Kids is a Swedish reality show for children currently airing on TV4. The show aired for twelve seasons on Sveriges Television (SVT), between 2005 and 2019. Ola Lindholm was the host of the show for the first four seasons but was then replaced with Richard Olsson. The second season was filmed in late 2006 and aired in early 2007. The show took a one-year break before returning in 2009. Except for 2006, 2008 and 2011, the show has been aired every year since its inaugural season. Carolina Klüft took over the role as host in 2019. SVT then dropped off the rights for the show. For 2020, the 13th season, TV4 has taken over the rights for the show, leading to Linda Lindorff taking over the hosting role.

Described as a children's version of Survivor, the show features two teams of children ("Björnarna" and "Lejonen") competing with each other in competitions in the Swedish forest Kolmården, where they live together until the show is over and the winners of the final win a trip to Africa. Unlike Survivor, however, a new contestant joins the competition every week and no one gets sent home. The new contestant joins the team that won that week's competition. The goal is to have as many contestants as possible in one's team as it will give the team an advantage in competitions and eventually the final.

Wild Kids won the Kristallen television award in 2007 for "Children's Show of the Year". The show has been considered a ratings success for SVT, and the episodes of the show's second season were viewed by approximately 625,000–700,000 people. In 2007, new episodes of Wild Kids received 200,000–300,000 views every week on SVT's online channel SVT Play, making it the channel's second most popular television show of the year.

Around 10,000 Swedish children (ages 11–13) apply every year for one of the fourteen spots available on the show. During one episode, a contestant saw her father choosing a new car over spending time with her. The girl burst into tears and although she got to see her father soon afterwards, the scene was heavily criticized by the Swedish media for treating the children too harshly. Lindholm defended the show by saying that the girl stopped crying quickly and the scene was heavily edited to make it seem worse than it actually was.

In 2011, an experimental reality show, Tittarnas Wild Kids ("The Viewers' Wild Kids"), aired for one season on SVT. The plot of the show was to let children from all of Sweden send a video where they carried out tasks to show knowledge within construction, animal spying, courage, nature, collaboration, strength and survival. Of the sent-in contributions, in each episode three finalists were chosen to go to Furuviksparken and carry out a real Wild Kids challenge. Ten episodes were produced, however the final two episodes were never broadcast since the show's presenter, Ola Lindholm, got prosecuted (and later convicted) of narcotic misuse.
