= Owe Sandström =

Swedish zoologist and costume designer

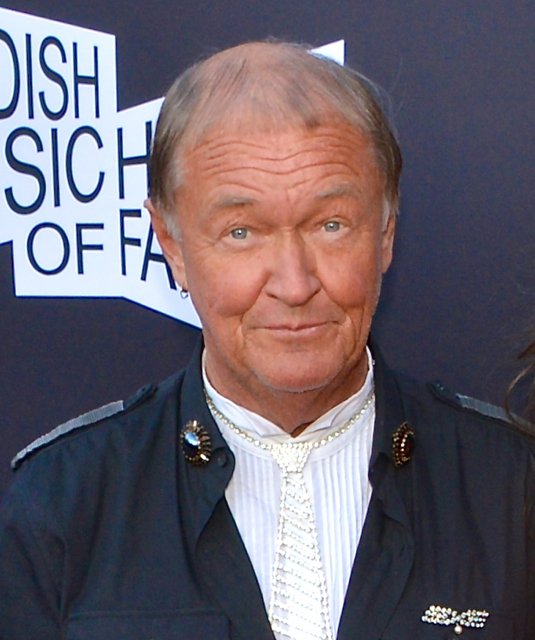
- Born: Karl Sandström; September 28, 1944 (age 81)
- Occupations: clothing designer zoologist safari leader flamenco dancer restaurateur florist
- Known for: ABBA's stage outfits

Karl Owe Sandström (born September 28, 1944) is a Swedish clothing designer, zoologist, safari leader, flamenco dancer, restaurateur, and florist. Probably best regarded as the designer of much of the music group ABBA's stage outfits.

Sandström is also known for several television performances, of which he amongst others took part at the Söndagsöppet segment "Hur gör djur" in the 1990s. He is also a teacher, having taught at the Spånga Gymnasium in Stockholm, where he specializes in nature and tropical animals.

Owe Sandström also introduced the opening number and show feature of Stockholm International Horse Show at the Globen.
