= Kull =

Kull may refer to:

== Arts ==
- Kull of Atlantis, a fictional character created by Robert E. Howard
  - Kull the Conqueror, a 1997 fantasy action film based on Howard's character and starring Kevin Sorbo
- King Kull (DC Comics), a Fawcett Comics and DC Comics character
- Kull (Inheritance), a subspecies of Urgals from the Inheritance Cycle series of novels by Christopher Paolini
- Kull (collection), a collection of short stories by Robert E. Howard

== Other uses ==
- Kull (surname)
- Kull, Punjab, a Union Council in the Punjab province of Pakistan
- KULL, a US radio station
- Kull shay, a magazine published in Cairo between 1925 and 1927
- Kull: The Legacy of the Raisingghs, a 2025 Indian television series
