= Kull (surname) =

Family name

Kull is a surname.

Notable people with this surname include:

- Brett Kull, American musician
- Caroline Kull, Swedish television host
- Dove Kull, American social worker
- Edward A. Kull, American director
- Edwin Kull, American politician
- Elle Kull, Estonian actress and politician
- John Kull, American baseball player
- Kalevi Kull, Estonian professor of biosemiotics
- Olevi Kull, Estonian professor of ecology
- Raimund Kull, Estonian conductor and composer
- Tiiu Kull, Estonian botanist
- Väino Kull (1943–2025), Estonian politician
