= Kristen Kroll =

American developmental biologist

Kristen L. Kroll
- Education: Northwestern University (BA); University of California, Berkeley (PhD)
- Known for: Transcriptional and epigenetic regulation of brain development
- Scientific career
- Fields: Developmental biology, Neuroscience, Transcription, Epigenetics
- Workplaces: Washington University in St. Louis

Kristen Kroll is an American developmental and stem cell biologist and Professor of Developmental Biology at Washington University School of Medicine. Her laboratory studies transcriptional and epigenetic regulation of brain development and its disruption to cause neurodevelopmental disorders.

== Early life and education ==
Kroll grew up in Wisconsin. She graduated from Wilmot High School in 1984 and received her Bachelor's Degree with the highest honors from Northwestern University in 1988. She became interested in a career in developmental biology while doing undergraduate research in the laboratory of Robert Holmgren, where her project involved cloning the segment polarity gene Cubitus interruptus, a Drosophila homolog of the GLI transcription factors that mediate Hedgehog signaling.

== Career ==
In her doctoral work in John Gerhart's lab at the University of California at Berkeley, Kroll developed nuclear transplantation-based approaches for transgenesis in embryos of the frog Xenopus laevis. In collaboration with Dr. Enrique Amaya, she used nuclear transfer-based transgenesis to directly produce animals with stable transgene integration in each cell without breeding. This work expanded the utility of Xenopus for studying vertebrate embryogenesis, enabling high throughput analysis of cis-regulatory elements and the study of later aspects of development, during which gene function could not previously be manipulated.

As a Damon Runyon-Walter Winchell Foundation Postdoctoral Fellow, Kroll pursued an interest in developmental biology during postdoctoral work in Marc Kirschner's lab at Harvard Medical School. She used functional screening of cDNA libraries to define novel regulators of early embryonic development. These included Geminin (Gmnn), a novel nuclear protein that she identified based on its ability to expand the Xenopus neural plate at the expense of non-neural tissue.

Kroll joined the Department of Developmental Biology (previously Dept. of Molecular Biology and Pharmacology) at Washington University School of Medicine in 2000. Her laboratory has focused on identifying how transcriptional and epigenetic regulation controls various aspects of neural development.

== Research areas ==
A major focus of work in the Kroll laboratory has been to identify mechanisms underlying transcriptional and epigenetic control of embryonic development. They demonstrated that Gmnn plays an essential role in these processes, showing that Gmnn is required for neural fate acquisition of embryonic stem cells and promotes an accessible and hyperacetylated chromatin state that facilitates neural gene transcription while also limiting non-neural fate acquisition (endoderm/mesoderm) through functional cooperativity with Polycomb complex (PcG)-mediated epigenetic repression. They demonstrated that Gmnn associates with and promotes histone acetylation at regulatory elements of many neurodevelopmental genes and used these data to construct gene regulatory networks underlying neural fate acquisition.

Beyond early cell fate acquisition, they also defined other aspects of development that require Gmnn, including regulating gene expression during neurogenesis, neuronal differentiation, and neural tube patterning and controlling Hox gene regulation to pattern the vertebrate limb, and they also demonstrated that Gmnn deficiency enhanced survival and response to therapy in mouse models of the pediatric brain tumor medulloblastoma. This body of work established Gmnn as a key cell-intrinsic regulator of several aspects of embryogenesis through its interactions with the SWI/SNF and Polycomb chromatin-modifying complexes.

Current work in the Kroll laboratory uses directed differentiation of human pluripotent stem cells to identify regulatory networks controlling the development of human neuronal cell types that are frequently disrupted in neurodevelopmental disorders. These include cortical interneurons (cINs), GABAergic inhibitory neurons that modulate excitatory neuronal activity in the cortex by providing local inhibition. The laboratory developed modified protocols for directed differentiation of human pluripotent stem cells (hPSCs) efficiently into cINs that provide an effective model for elucidating mechanisms of human cIN development. They have subsequently used this model to define regulatory networks that control human cIN development.

As of 2021, Kroll leads efforts to characterize how pathogenic gene variants contribute to intellectual and developmental disabilities (IDDs) in hPSC-derived models at Washington University School of Medicine (WUSM). She leads the Cellular Models program for WUSM's Intellectual and Developmental Disabilities Research Center (IDDRC), coordinating with the IDDRC's Clinical-Translational Core to build patient-derived cellular models of IDDs. She coordinates human cell and organoid-based modeling under WUSM's Precision Medicine Integrated Experimental Resources (PreMIER) platform, WU's model organism screening platform for precision medicine. She also co-leads the NICHD-supported Cross-IDDRC Human Cellular Models Group, which engages the 14 IDDRCs in the United States in collaborative efforts to build and share human IDD cellular models, develop cross-IDDRC calibrated platforms for human cellular modeling, perform data meta-analyses, and develop IDD model bio- and data-repositories models as resources for the network.

== Awards ==
Kroll has received several awards for her work, including the March of Dimes Basil O'Connor Award, the American Cancer Society Research Scholar grant, and American Cancer Society Hope Award. Her other awards include:

- 1986-1988: Alice G. Hough Scholarship, Northwestern University
- 1987: Phi Eta Sigma honorary society, Northwestern University
- 1988: Phi Beta Kappa, Northwestern University
- 1992: Teaching Effectiveness Award and Outstanding Graduate Student Instructor, University of California, Berkeley
- 1996-1998: Damon Runyon-Walter Winchell Cancer Research Fund Fellow, Harvard Medical School
- 2000: Howard Hughes Medical Institute Faculty Development Research Award
- 2001: March of Dimes, Basil O'Connor Award, Wash. U. School of Medicine
- 2003: Wilmot High School Alumni Hall of Fame
- 2006: American Cancer Society Research Scholar Award, Wash. U. School of Medicine
- 2007: Hope Award, American Cancer Society, Wash. U. School of Medicine

== Service contributions ==
- National Institutes of Health Study Sections and Special Emphasis Panels: Permanent member Developmental Biology 2 (DEV2) NIH Study Section (2014-2020); Ad hoc Member: Molecular, Cellular, and Developmental Neuroscience (MDCN) study section, Neurogenetics and Genomics Special Emphasis and Challenge Grants Panels, Neurogenesis and Cell Fate (NCF) Study Sections, Genomic and Genetic Analysis in Xenopus Special Emphasis Panels
- Co-chair, Cross-Intellectual, and Developmental Disabilities Research Center (IDDRC) Human Stem Cell Models Group (2018–present)
- Co-Director, Instructor, or Lecturer, Cold Spring Harbor Laboratory Cell and Developmental Biology of Xenopus laevis Course (1996-1999, 2001, 2003, 2005, 2008-2010)

== Personal life ==
Kroll is married to John D. Bradley, a scientist at Bayer. Her sister, Jennifer Lee Kroll, died on May 9, 2020, at 52 years of age, due to metastatic breast cancer. She was writer who published more than 30 books. Kroll is also the granddaughter of Josephine LeGrave Wautlet, author of several works, including a language course called Phonetic Walloon for Belgian Americans. Her grandmother was also featured in an oral history on Belgian Americans and the Walloon language (University of Wisconsin, Green Bay).

== Selected publications ==
Kristen Kroll has more than 50 publications in the field of developmental biology including:

- Kroll, K.L.; Amaya, E. (1996-10-01). "Transgenic Xenopus embryos from sperm nuclear transplantations reveal FGF signaling requirements during gastrulation". Development. 122 (10). The Company of Biologists: 3173–3183. doi:10.1242/dev.122.10.3173. ISSN 1477-9129. PMID 8898230. S2CID 20349983.
- Postigo, A. A. (2003-05-15). "Regulation of Smad signaling through a differential recruitment of coactivators and corepressors by ZEB proteins". The EMBO Journal. 22 (10). Wiley: 2453–2462. doi:10.1093/emboj/cdg226. ISSN 1460-2075. PMC 155984. PMID 12743039.
- Orenic, T V; Slusarski, D C; Kroll, K L; Holmgren, R A (1990). "Cloning and characterization of the segment polarity gene cubitus interruptus Dominant of Drosophila". Genes & Development. 4 (6). Cold Spring Harbor Laboratory: 1053–1067. doi:10.1101/gad.4.6.1053. ISSN 0890-9369. PMID 2166702.
- Kroll, K.L.; Salic, A.N.; Evans, L.M.; Kirschner, M.W. (1998-08-15). "Geminin, a neuralizing molecule that demarcates the future neural plate at the onset of gastrulation". Development. 125 (16). The Company of Biologists: 3247–3258. doi:10.1242/dev.125.16.3247. ISSN 1477-9129. PMID 9671596.
- Lustig, K.D.; Kroll, K.L.; Sun, E.E.; Kirschner, M.W. (1996-12-01). "Expression cloning of a Xenopus T-related gene (Xombi) involved in mesodermal patterning and blastopore lip formation". Development. 122 (12). The Company of Biologists: 4001–4012. doi:10.1242/dev.122.12.4001. ISSN 1477-9129. PMID 9012520.
- Seo, Seongjin; Herr, Anabel; Lim, Jong-Won; Richardson, Genova A.; Richardson, Helena; Kroll, Kristen L. (2005-07-15). "Geminin regulates neuronal differentiation by antagonizing Brg1 activity". Genes & Development. 19 (14). Cold Spring Harbor Laboratory: 1723–1734. doi:10.1101/gad.1319105. ISSN 0890-9369. PMC 1176010. PMID 16024661.
- Seo, Seongjin; Richardson, Genova A.; Kroll, Kristen L. (2005-01-01). "The SWI/SNF chromatin remodeling protein Brg1 is required for vertebrate neurogenesis and mediates transactivation of Ngn and NeuroD". Development. 132 (1). The Company of Biologists: 105–115. doi:10.1242/dev.01548. ISSN 1477-9129. PMID 15576411. S2CID 6987785.
- Seo, Seongjin; Lim, Jong-Won; Yellajoshyula, Dhananjay; Chang, Li-Wei; Kroll, Kristen L (2007-11-15). "Neurogenin and NeuroD direct transcriptional targets and their regulatory enhancers". The EMBO Journal. 26 (24). Wiley: 5093–5108. doi:10.1038/sj.emboj.7601923. ISSN 0261-4189. PMC 2140110. PMID 18007592.
- Salic, A.N.; Kroll, K.L.; Evans, L.M.; Kirschner, M.W. (1997-12-01). "Sizzled: a secreted Xwnt8 antagonist expressed in the ventral marginal zone of Xenopus embryos". Development. 124 (23). The Company of Biologists: 4739–4748. doi:10.1242/dev.124.23.4739. ISSN 1477-9129. PMID 9428410.
- Lustig, K.D.; Kroll, K.; Sun, E.; Ramos, R.; Elmendorf, H.; Kirschner, M.W. (1996-10-01). "A Xenopus nodal-related gene that acts in synergy with noggin to induce complete secondary axis and notochord formation". Development. 122 (10). The Company of Biologists: 3275–3282. doi:10.1242/dev.122.10.3275. ISSN 1477-9129. PMID 8898239.
