= Tina Leijonberg =

Swedish singer, television presenter and actress

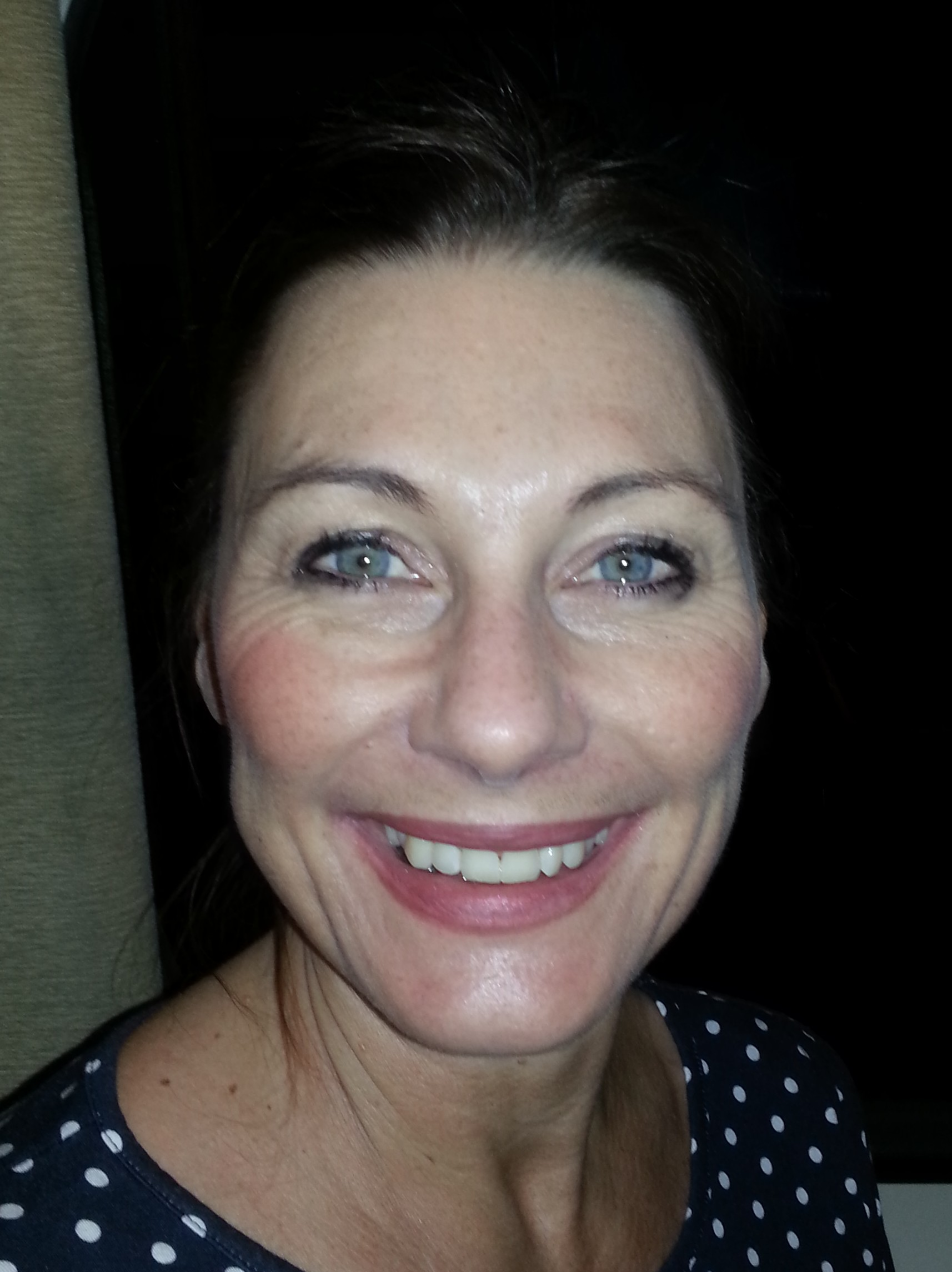
- Tina Leijonberg in November 2012
- Born: Ella Katarina Lejonberg; 11 February 1962 (age 64); Eslöv, Sweden
- Occupations: Television presenter, Singer, Actress

Tina Ella Katarina Leijonberg (born 11 February 1962) is a Swedish singer, television presenter and actress.

== Early life ==
Leijonborg was born in Eslöv and moved to Lund with her family at the age of nine. She started dancing ballet at the age of four and educated herself at the Balettakademien in Gothenburg and after that studied music in Los Angeles, USA in 1988 and continued her education within the field of Theater in Gothenburg.

== Career ==
Leijonberg has worked as an actress and singer at Stockholms stadsteater between 1991 and 1992 and again in 2002. She has also worked as a television presenter at SVT presenting Söndagsöppet in 1996, replacing Alice Bah. Before that she acted in the drama series Tre Kronor which was broadcast on TV4 as the character "Pilla". Leijonberg has toured around the world with the Singer Dr Alban, sung jazz, blues, rock, and with a big band, she has participated in bar shows so called Krogshower with Janne Carlsson, Lasse Berghagen and Wenche Myhre. Leijonberg has also been part of several musicals such as Grease, Evita, Fame and Sol, vind och vatten at Chinateatern.

She has also played in farce shows in Linköping and as a maid in the play Söderkåkar at Boulevardteatern in 2003, she played Liza Minnelli in a Christmas show at Grand Hotel the same year. Tina Leijonberg has participated in Melodifestivalen two times, first in 1993, and then in 1995 where she was unplaced both times.. She has acted in a commercial for Vanish.

In 2004, Leijonberg auditioned for one of the roles in the Swedish version of the hit musical Mamma Mia, she lost the role to Gunilla Backman however.

In 2010, Leijonberg was chosen by the members of the rock group Queen to star as the female lead in the Swedish adaptation of the musical We Will Rock You at Cirkus in Stockholm.

== Melodifestivalen ==
- Närmare dig (unplaced in Melodifestivalen 1993)
- Himmel på vår jord (performed along with Monica Silverstrand, unplaced in Melodifestivalen 1995)

== Filmography ==
- 1993 - Härifrån till Kim
- 1994 - Pillertrillaren
- 1994-1997 - Tre kronor
- 1997 - Hemvärn och påssjuka
- 1999 - Bäddat för sex
- 2006 - Di Leva's Free Life
