= Krull =

Krull is a surname originating from Prussian nobility.

== People ==
- Alexander Krull (born 1970), German singer
- Annie Krull (1876–1947), German operatic soprano
- Germaine Krull (1897–1985), photographer
- Hasso Krull (born 1964), Estonian poet, literary and cultural critic and translator
- Jake Krull (1938–2016), American politician
- Kathleen Krull (born 1952), American author of children's books
- Lucas Krull (born 1998), American football player
- Reinhard Krull (born 1954), West German field hockey player
- Suzanne Krull (born 1966), American actress
- Tobias Krull (born 1977), German politician
- Wolfgang Krull, German mathematician, who was responsible for the development of numerous mathematical concepts:
  - Krull dimension
  - Krull's principal ideal theorem
  - Krull's theorem
  - Krull–Akizuki theorem
  - Krull–Schmidt theorem
  - Krull topology, an example of the profinite group
  - Krull's intersection, a theorem within algebraic ring theory that describes the behaviors of certain local rings

== In fiction and the arts ==
- Krull (film), a 1983 heroic fantasy film
  - Krull (video game), the arcade, Atari and pinball adaptations of that film
- Felix Krull, the title character in Confessions of Felix Krull
- Krull, a country in the fictional Discworld
- Krull, a supporting ape character in the 2001 film Planet of the Apes, played by Cary-Hiroyuki Tagawa

== See also ==
- Krul
