= Licensing factor =

A licensing factor is a protein or complex of proteins that allows an origin of replication to begin DNA replication at that site. Licensing factors primarily occur in eukaryotic cells, since bacteria use simpler systems to initiate replication. However, many archaea use homologues of eukaryotic licensing factors to initiate replication.

== Function ==
Origins of replication represent start sites for DNA replication and so their "firing" must be regulated to maintain the correct karyotype of the cell in question. The origins are required to fire only once per cell cycle, an observation that led to the postulated existence of licensing factors by biologists in the first place. If the origins were not carefully regulated then DNA replication could be restarted at that origin giving rise to multiple copies of a section of DNA. This could be damaging to cells and could have detrimental effects on the organism as a whole.

The control that licensing factors exert over the cycle represents a flexible system, necessary so that different cell types in an organism can control the timing of DNA replication to their own cell cycles.

== Subcellular distribution ==
The factors themselves are found in different places in different organisms. For example, in metazoan organisms, they are commonly synthesised in the cytoplasm of the cell to be imported into the nucleus when required. The situation is different in yeast where the factors present are degraded and resynthesised throughout the cell cycle but are found in the nucleus for most of their existence.

== Example in yeast ==
Immediately after mitosis has finished the cell cycle starts again, entering G1 phase of the cycle. At this point protein synthesis of various products required for the rest of the cycle begins. Two of the proteins synthesised are called Cdc6 and Cdt1 and are only synthesised in G1 phase. These two together bind to the origin recognition complex (ORC), which is already bound at the origin and in fact never leaves these sites throughout the cycle. Now we have a so-called pre-replication complex, which then allows a heterohexameric protein complex of proteins MCM2 to 7 to bind. This entire hexamer acts as a helicase unwinding the double stranded DNA. At this point Cdc6 leaves the complex and is inactivated, by being degraded in yeast but by being exported from the nucleus in metazoans, triggered by CDK-dependent phosphorylation. The next steps included the loading of a variety of other proteins like MCM10, a CDK, DDK and Cdc45, the latter directly required for loading the DNA polymerase. During this period Cdt1 is released from the complex and the cell leaves G1 phase and enters S phase when replication starts.

From the above sequence we can see that Cdc6 and Cdt1 fulfill the role of licensing factors. They are only produced in G1 phase, in addition to which binding of all the proteins in this process excludes binding of additional copies. In this way their mode of action is limited to starting replication once, since once they have been ejected from the complex by other proteins, the cell enters S phase, during which they are not re-produced or re-activated. Thus they act as licensing factors, but only together. It has been suggested that the whole pre-replication complex be called the licensing factor since the whole is required for assembling additional proteins to initiate replication.
