= Melvin Krol =

German footballer (born 1998)

Personal information
- Date of birth: 8 January 1998 (age 28)
- Place of birth: Hamburg, Germany
- Height: 1.79 m (5 ft 10 in)
- Position: Forward

Youth career
- –2008: Einigkeit Wilhelmsburg
- 2008–2015: Hamburger SV
- 2015–2017: Werder Bremen

Senior career*
Years	Team	Apps	(Gls)
2017–2018	Werder Bremen II	5	(0)
2019	Holstein Kiel II	4	(0)
- * Club domestic league appearances and goals as of 14:28, 2 March 2021 (UTC)

Melvin Krol (born 8 January 1998) is a German footballer who last played as a forward for Holstein Kiel II.
