= Tobias Krull =

German politician (born 1977)

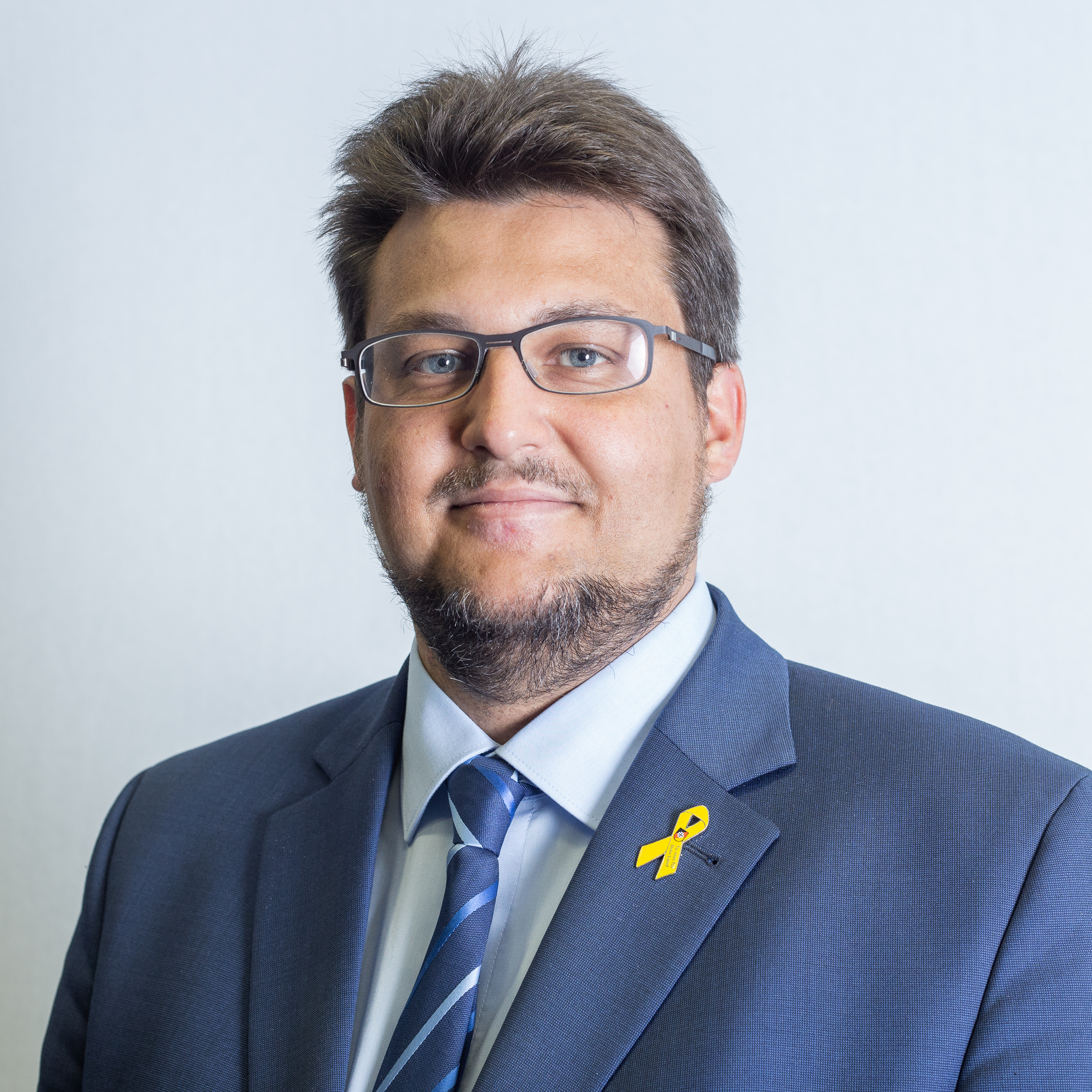
- Krull in 2018

Member of the Landtag of Saxony-Anhalt
- Incumbent
- Assumed office 12 April 2016
- Preceded by: Jürgen Scharf
- Constituency: Magdeburg II

Personal details
- Born: 1 May 1977 (age 49)
- Party: Christian Democratic Union (since 1996)

Tobias Krull (born 1 May 1977) is a German politician serving as a member of the Landtag of Saxony-Anhalt since 2016. He has served as chairman of the Christian Democratic Union in Magdeburg since 2010.
