= Bengt Grafström =

Swedish presenter (born 1946)

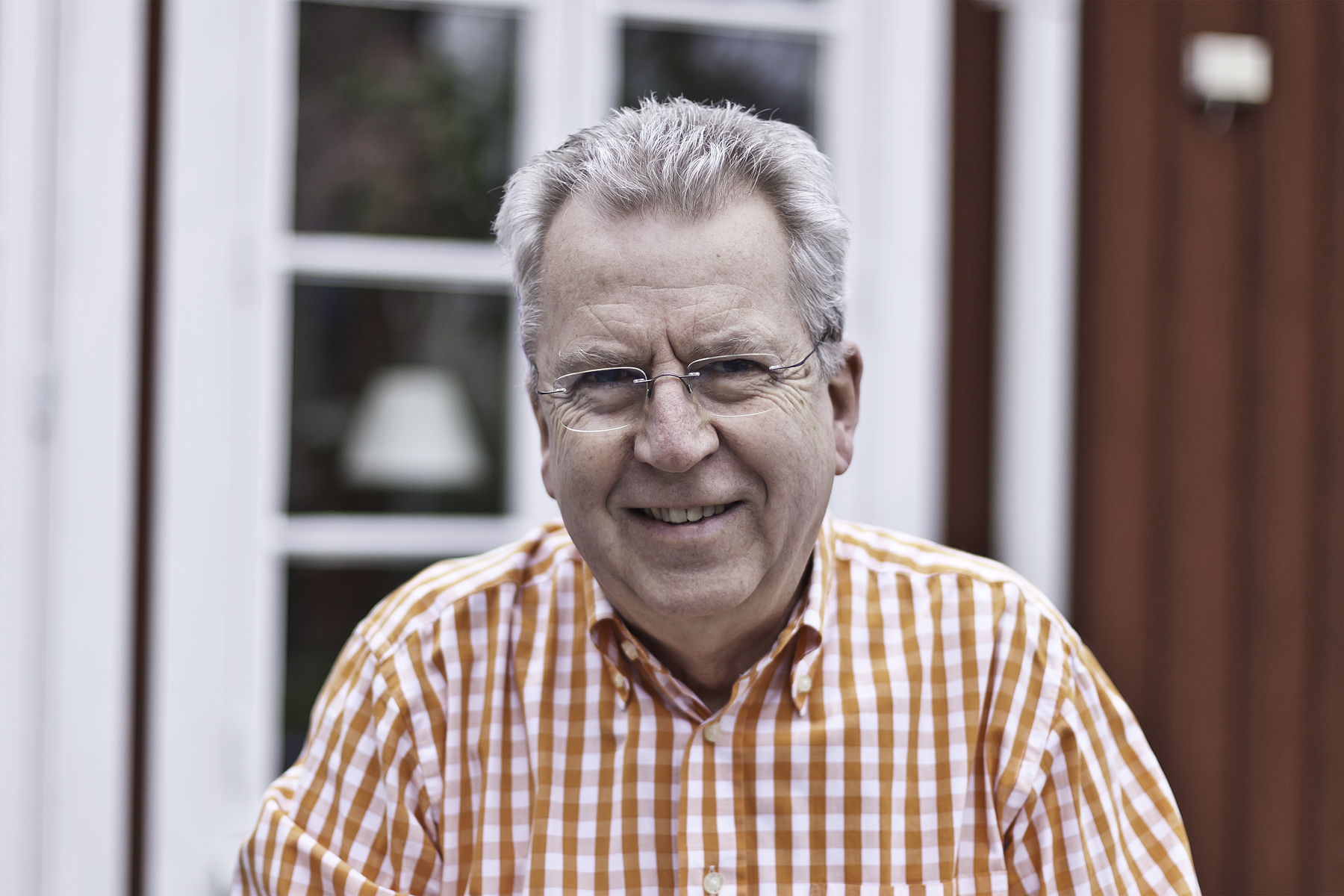
- Bengt Grafström

Bengt Grafström (born 28 July 1946 in Stockholm) is a Swedish presenter for both radio and television.

Grafström began working for Sveriges Radio in 1968. When TV2 was launched in 1969, Grafström began working as a freelancer and also took up experience as a producer for SR TV1. Between the 1970s and 1980s, Grafström took up a job of programme editor on SR P3. In the 1980s, he began hosting the radio show Birger Ballongen Bengtssons Bravader. Grafström was the original presenter of the late night radio show ”Karlavagnen” on Sveriges Radio. In 1988, he hosted the Melodifestivalen, where Tommy Körberg won the right to represent Sweden at the 1988 Eurovision Song Contest. In addition, Grafström commentated for SVT viewers at the 1988 Contest. From 2001 to 2011, Grafström worked for P4 Kalmar.

He is a cancer survivor.
