= Ola Lindholm =

Swedish television personality

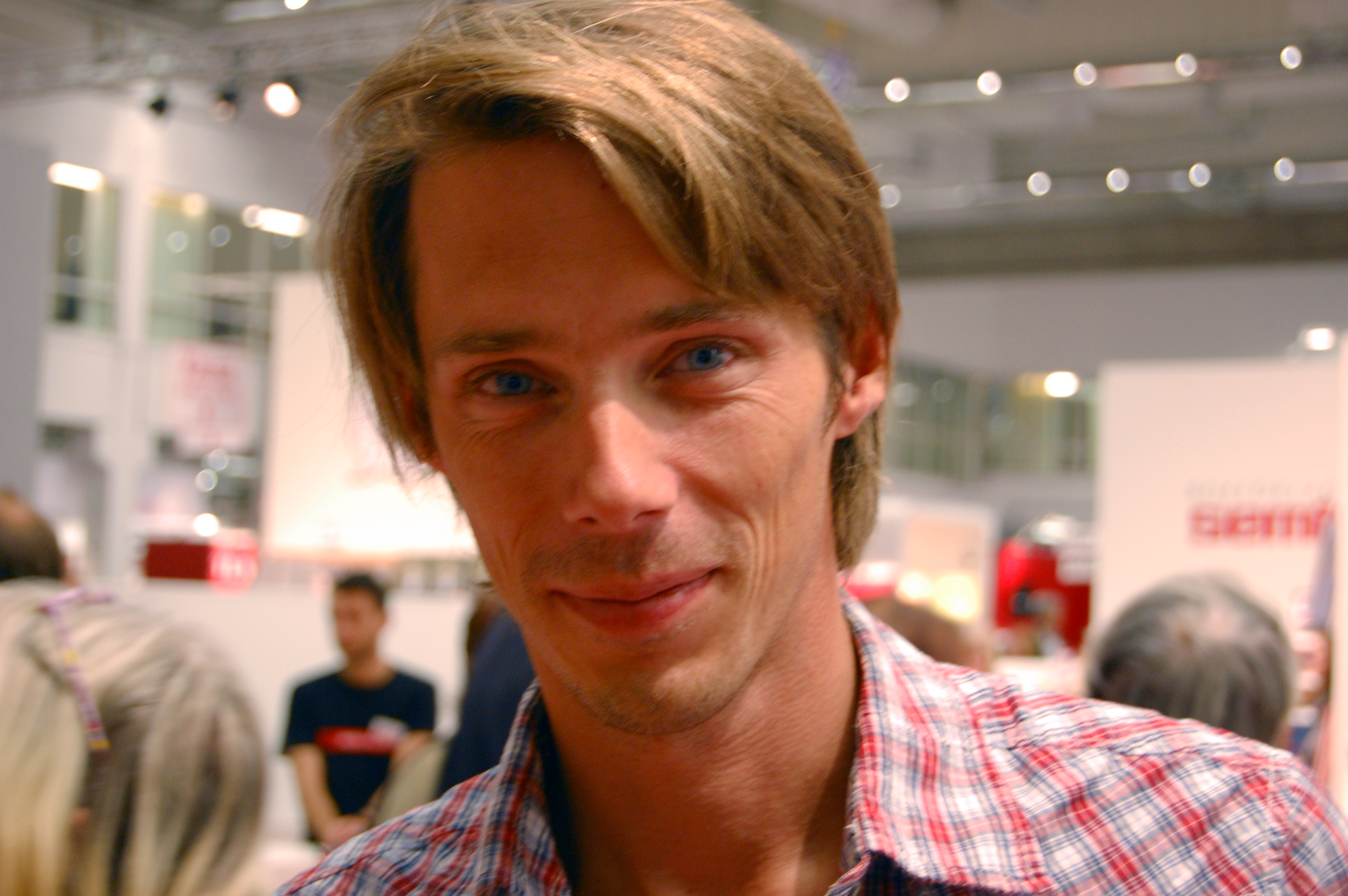
- Ola Lindholm at Gothenburg Book Fair 2009
- Born: 5 November 1970 (age 54); Karlshamn, Blekinge County, Sweden
- Occupation(s): Actor, television personality, editor in chief

Ola Henrik Lindholm (born 5 November 1970) is a Swedish television personality from Karlshamn, Blekinge County. He has been the host of several popular television shows in Sweden, including Skrotslaget, Ola 21:30, Söndagsöppet, Riktig talkshow, Myror i brallan, Wild Kids, Glasklart, and Melodifestivalen 2004. Lindholm was the editor in chief of the popular Swedish children's magazine Kamratposten from 2006 to 2011. He currently lives in Lidingö with his wife and son.

== Career ==
Lindholm began his television career in the mid-1990s. Up until 2003, he had hosted such television shows as Myror i brallan, Ola 21:30, Skrotslaget, Riktig talkshow, and Söndagsöppet. In 2004, he was chosen to host that year's version of Melodifestivalen, an annual music competition and the most popular television program in Sweden. The following year, Lindholm hosted the first season of Swedish reality show Wild Kids. Described as a children's version of Survivor, the show features two groups of children competing with each other in competitions in the Swedish forest Kolmården, where the contestants live together until the show is over and the winners win a trip to Africa. A second season of Wild Kids was filmed in late 2006 and aired in early 2007. The third season, also hosted by Lindholm, aired in 2009, and a fourth season is currently in production.

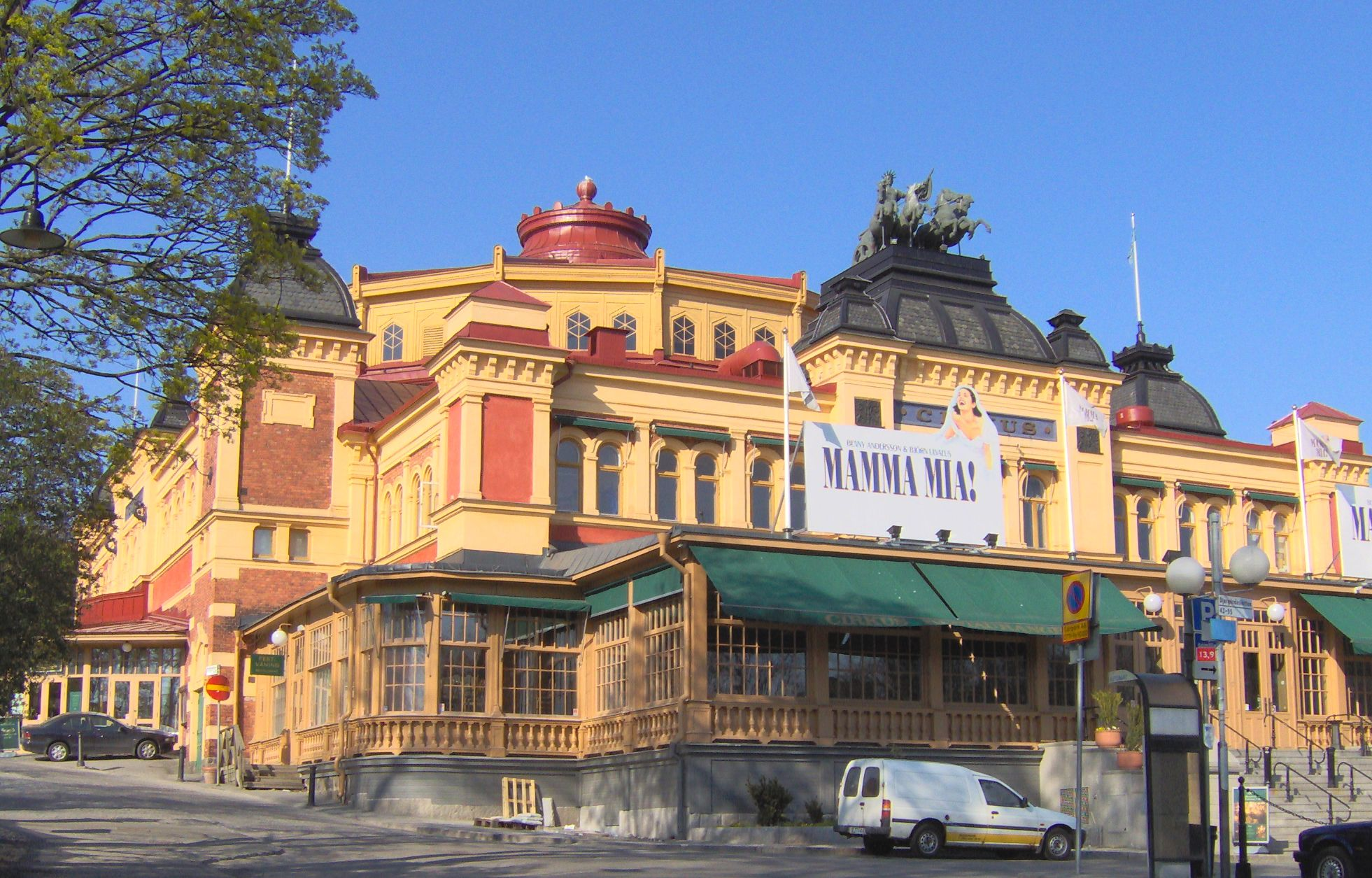
Lindholm hosted the 2007 Nickelodeon Kids Choice Awards, which was arranged at Cirkus in Stockholm.

On 30 October 2007, Lindholm hosted the Nickelodeon Kids Choice Awards, which was arranged at Cirkus in Stockholm. At the end of 2007, Lindholm appeared on Babben Larsson's talk show Babben & Co that aired on the national television broadcaster Sveriges Television (SVT). Prior to his appearance on that show, Lindholm had only made a few appearances on television the previous months. He therefore believes his appearance on Babben & Co was the reason he was selected to host the game-show Glasklart, a newly created television project by SVT that began airing in March 2008. Glasklart was the first game-show Lindholm had hosted in his career. The program, which features charades, was described by Lindholm as an "hour of warm and exciting entertainment" mixed with knowledge and craziness.

Since 2006, Lindholm was the editor in chief of the popular Swedish children's magazine Kamratposten. The previous editor in chief was Eva Birmann. It was announced on 30 May 2006 that Lindholm would take over the magazine on 1 October that year. He considered Kamratposten to be a "classic institution" and it was not hard for him to accept the offer. Prior to joining the magazine, Lindholm had experienced working with children on the reality show Wild Kids and the children's nature show Myror i brallan, both of which aired on SVT.

He commented that he easily connects with children because he treats them like adults and respects their opinions.

== Personal life ==
Lindholm was raised in Karlshamn, Blekinge County. He currently lives in Lidingö outside of Stockholm with his wife Lotta Bäcker and their son Loa Lindholm.

Lindholm quit his job as editor in chief for Kamratposten in May 2011 after being charged for the use of cocaine. Lindholm hosted the SVT program Tittarnas Wild Kids (Viewers' Wild Kids), a Wild Kids spin-off program which was mid-season at the time. Because of his prosecution, SVT pulled the remaining two episodes of the season from their schedule. Lindholm has denied the allegations. A random police test after a football game at Råsunda showed trace amounts of benzoylecgonine in his urine. The trial began on 5 September the same year. He was found guilty on 12 September and sentenced against his denials to pay a fine.
