= Caroline Larsson =

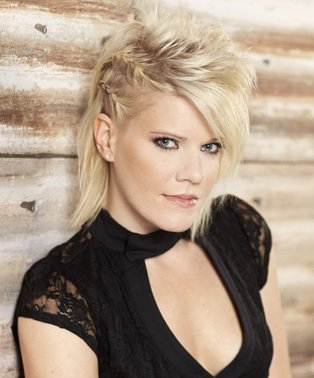
- Caroline Larsson

Background information
- Born: September 28, 1986 (age 39); Askim, Sweden
- Genres: country
- Occupation: singer
- Instruments: guitar, harmonica
- Labels: Weeki Music
- Website: Official Website (in swedish)

Caroline Elisabeth Larsson (born in Askim, Sweden on 28 September 1986) is a Swedish singer, songwriter.

== Career ==
Born in Askim, Gothenburg, Caroline Larsson began writing songs when she was 16–17 years old. She also played guitar and harmonica and wrote her own material. In 2008, Larsson released her debut album In the Moment on her own label Weeki Records in association with Universal Music, which included the single "Hold on My Heart" written by Per Gessle. She opened for Manfred Mann's Earth Band for their Scandinavian tour in 2009 and in conjunction with the release of her second album Me and I in 2011, she toured jointly with Plura Jonsson, Carla Jonsson from Eldkvarn and Anders Ekborg. In the autumn the same year she recorded a tribute to Eva Cassidy together with Bengt Mangnusson. She released her album Rebel Thinker in 2014 produced by Amir Aly. Larsson performed the songs live together with her Music City Band, which resulted in the album Nashville Country Night: Live released in October 2014.

== Discography ==
=== Albums ===
Year	Album	Peak positions	Certification
Year	Album	SWE	Certification
2008	In the Moment	14	
2011	Me and I	17	
2012	A Tribute to Eva Cassidy (joint album with Bengt Magnusson)	18	
2014	Rebel Thinker	28	

Live albums

Year	Album	Peak positions	Certification
Year	Album	SWE	Certification
2014	Nashville Country Night: Live (with Music City Band)	14	

=== Singles ===
Year	Single	Peak positions	Album
Year	Single	SWE	Album
2014	"Hold on My Heart (Hey It's Alright)"	13	In the Moment
