= Nicholas Kroll =

Director of the BBC Trust

Nicholas Kroll CB
- Born: Nicholas James Kroll; June 23, 1954 (age 72)
- Education: St Paul's School, London
- Alma mater: University of Oxford
- Employer(s): BBC; BBC Trust; HM Treasury; Department for Transport; Department for Culture, Media and Sport

Nicholas James Kroll CB (born 23 June 1954) is a British civil servant who served as director of the BBC Trust from 2007 to 2014. He was the principal adviser to the BBC Trust and head of the BBC Trust Unit, the BBC department that supported and advised the trust.

== Education ==
Kroll was educated at St Paul's School, London and the University of Oxford, where he was an undergraduate at Corpus Christi College, Oxford.

== Career ==
Kroll was originally appointed director of governance at the BBC in October 2004. His appointment followed a shake-up of the governance arrangements at the BBC implemented by the then BBC chairman, Michael Grade. Kroll was appointed to lead the Governance Unit, a small team of staff reporting to and supporting the Board of Governors of the BBC.

Upon the formation of the BBC Trust as the governing body of the corporation, Kroll was appointed Director. He is the head of the Trust Unit, a group of nearly 70 BBC staff who report directly to the BBC Trust, outside of the BBC management chain. In 2010/11 the cost of the Trust Unit was £10.8 million.

Prior to working at the BBC, Kroll was a career civil servant; he joined the civil service in 1977.

From 2002 to 2004 he was chief operating officer and deputy to the permanent secretary at the Department for Culture, Media and Sport, responsible for developing and delivering the department's change management programme and setting new strategic priorities within the DCMS. Previous posts at the DCMS include corporate services director (2000 to 2002) and a period as acting permanent secretary during 2001. He was also director of Creative Industries, Media and Broadcasting Group (1996 to 2000), head of Broadcasting Policy Division (1995 to 1996), and head of the Arts Division (1993 to 1995).

Kroll also worked at HM Treasury, where he was head of the European Community Budget Division (1990 to 1993) and the head of Banking Policy Branch (1986 to 1990). Previously, he worked at the Department of Transport (1982 to 1986) and the Department of Environment and Transport (1977 to 1982).

=== Awards and honours ===
Kroll was appointed Companion of the Order of the Bath (CB) in the 2002 New Year Honours.

== Personal life ==
Kroll is married and has two children. His brother Simon Kroll is a professor of Paediatrics and Molecular Infectious Diseases at Imperial College London.
