= Krul =

Krul is a surname. Notable people with the surname include:

- Huiberdina Krul (1922-1994), Dutch Olympic artistic gymnast
- J. T. Krul (born 1972), American comic book writer, best known for his work on Aspen MLT's Fathom comic series
- Jan Harmenszoon Krul (1601–1646), Dutch Catholic playwright
- Tim Krul, (born 1988), Dutch footballer
- André Krul, (born 1987), Dutch footballer

== Other uses ==
- Flourish of approval, a symbol used for correcting work. Also known as the krul.

== See also ==
- Krol
- Krull
