= Kroll =

Kroll may refer to:

== Entertainment ==
- Kroll (film), a Polish thriller released in 1991
- Kroll & Prumni, a war game released in 1979
- Kroll Show, an American sketch comedy television series, 2013–2015
- The Power of Kroll, a British science fiction television series, 1978–1979

== Other uses ==
- Kroll (surname), includes a list of notable people with the name
- Krøll Cranes A/S, a Danish company located in Copenhagen and specializing in crane manufacturing
- Kroll Inc., an American financial and risk advisory firm
- Kroll Opera House, a German opera house located in Berlin, 1844–1951
- Kroll process, an industrial process used with titanium
