= Caroline Norrby =

Swedish television host (born 1979)

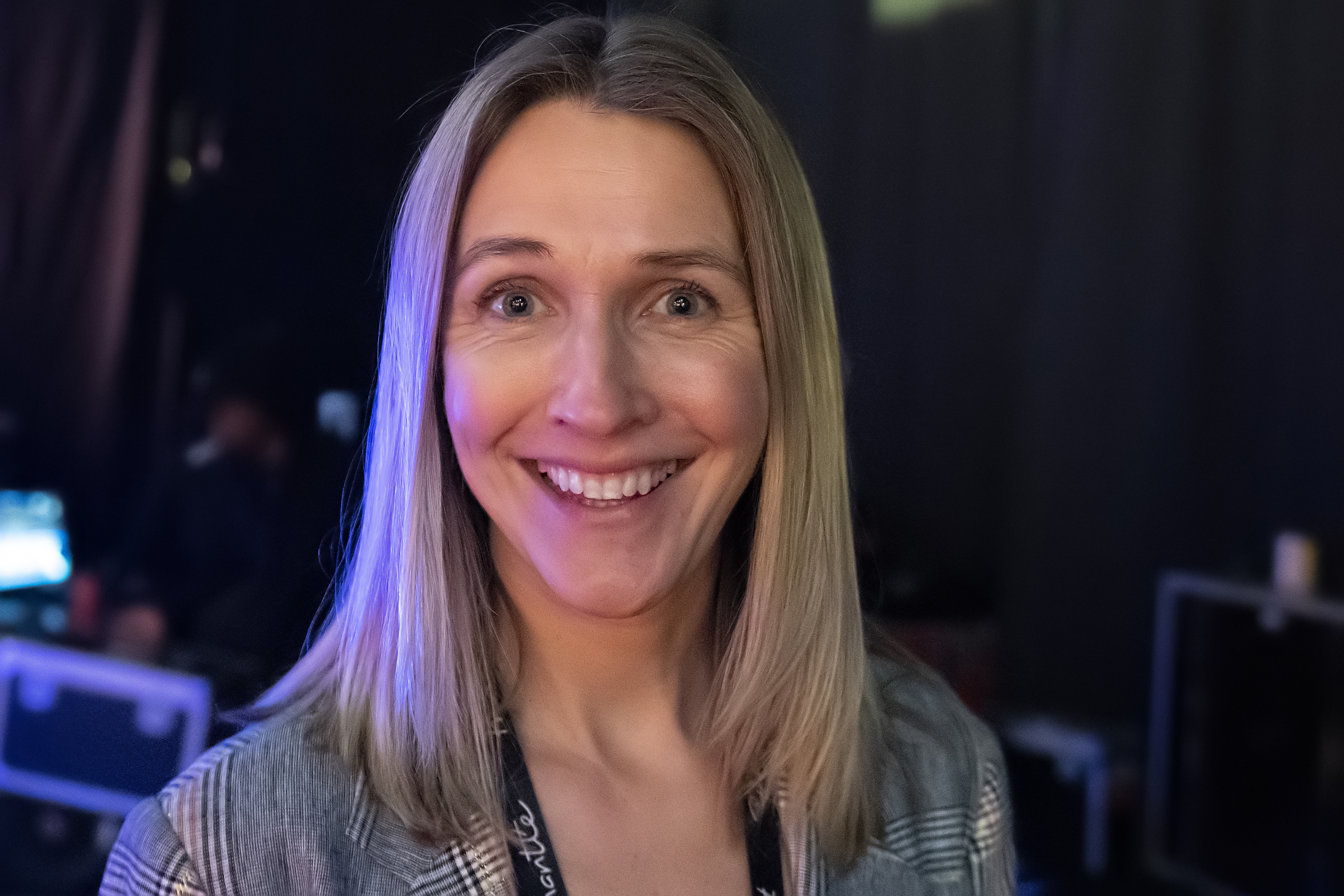
- Norrby in March 2021
- Born: Caroline Kull; 6 September 1979 (age 46); Stockholm, Sweden
- Other name: Caroline Kull
- Occupation: Television host
- Years active: 2010–present

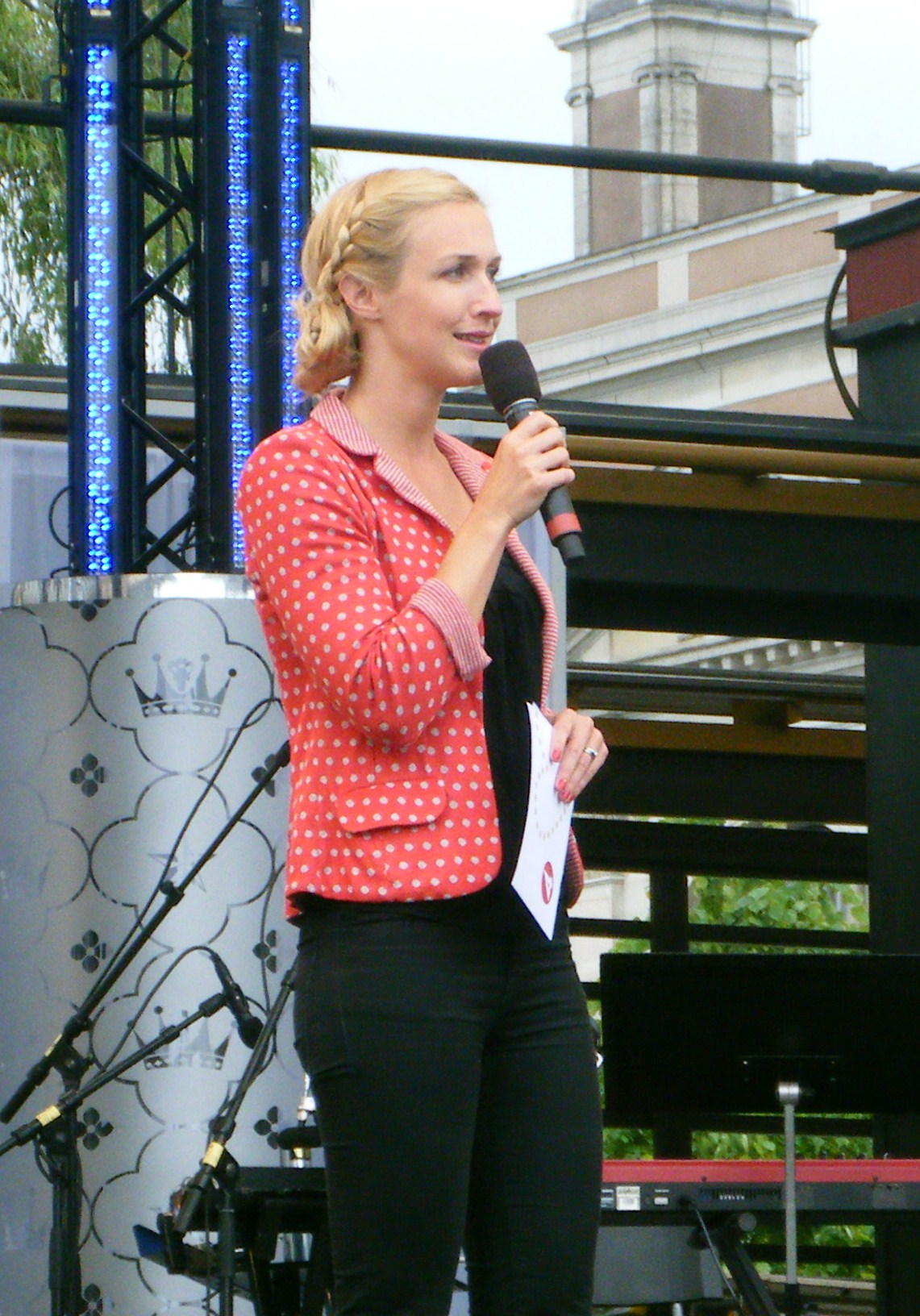
Norrby in June 2010

Caroline Norrby (née Kull; born 6 August 1979) is a Swedish television host.

Born in Stockholm, Norrby began her career in 2010 and is best known for currently hosting Såld på hus on TV4. Prior to hosting Såld på hus, she presented the children's program Lattjo Lajban.
