= Söndagsöppet =

- Country of origin: Sweden
- Original language: Swedish
- No. of seasons: 27

Original release
- Network: SVT
- Release: 7 October 1990 – 21 December 2003

Söndagsöppet is a television show, which was broadcast on SVT on Sundays. The first broadcast was on 7 October 1990 and the last episode was broadcast on 21 December 2003, after twenty-seven seasons.
