= DNA replication factor CDT1 =

Protein found in humans

CDT1
Available structures
PDB	Ortholog search: PDBe RCSB
PDB	List of PDB id codes 2LE8, 2WVR

Identifiers
- Aliases: CDT1, DUP, RIS2, chromatin licensing and DNA replication factor 1
- External IDs: OMIM: 605525; MGI: 1914427; HomoloGene: 32650; GeneCards: CDT1; OMA:CDT1 - orthologs

Gene location (Human)
Chr.	Chromosome 16 (human)
Band	16q24.3	Start	88,803,789 bp
Band	16q24.3	End	88,809,258 bp

Gene location (Mouse)
Chr.	Chromosome 8 (mouse)
Band	8|8 E1	Start	123,294,754 bp
Band	8|8 E1	End	123,300,293 bp
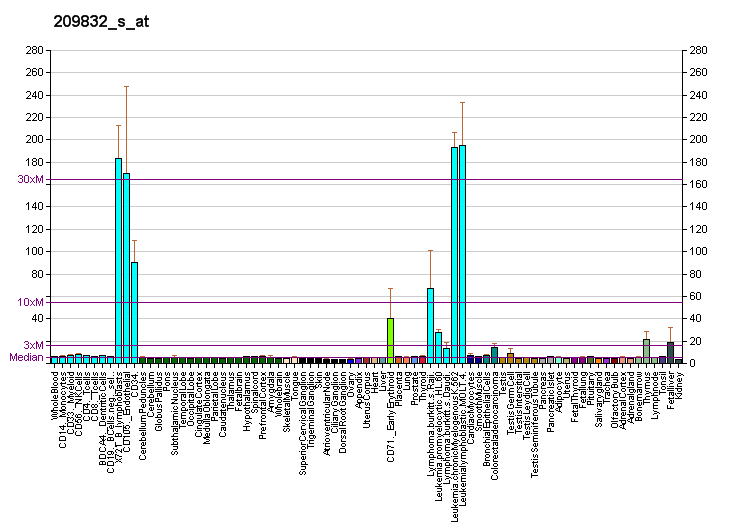
RNA expression pattern
Bgee	Human / Mouse (ortholog); Top expressed in: mucosa of paranasal sinus; oocyte; gingival epithelium; secondary oocyte; ventricular zone; ganglionic eminence; mucosa of transverse colon; gonad; trabecular bone; bone marrow / Top expressed in: fetal liver hematopoietic progenitor cell; endocardial cushion; tibiofemoral joint; abdominal wall; primitive streak; condyle; fossa; Paneth cell; vas deferens; primary oocyte; More reference expression data
BioGPS	More reference expression data
Gene ontology
Molecular function	DNA binding; protein binding; chromatin binding; DNA polymerase binding
Cellular component	cytosol; nucleus; nucleoplasm; nuclear body; chromosome, centromeric region; chromosome; kinetochore; cytoplasm
Biological process	DNA replication checkpoint signaling; DNA replication; cell cycle; regulation of nuclear cell cycle DNA replication; regulation of transcription involved in G1/S transition of mitotic cell cycle; regulation of DNA-dependent DNA replication initiation; chromosome segregation; attachment of mitotic spindle microtubules to kinetochore; mitotic cell cycle; positive regulation of protein-containing complex assembly; regulation of chromosome organization; positive regulation of chromatin binding; cell division; kinetochore organization; DNA replication preinitiation complex assembly; response to sorbitol; deactivation of mitotic spindle assembly checkpoint; regulation of DNA replication origin binding; negative regulation of protein localization to kinetochore; positive regulation of protein localization to kinetochore; positive regulation of DNA-dependent DNA replication; positive regulation of mediator complex assembly; G1/S transition of mitotic cell cycle; positive regulation of DNA replication; mitotic cytokinesis
Sources:Amigo / QuickGO
Orthologs
Species	Human	Mouse
Entrez	81620	67177
Ensembl	ENSG00000167513	ENSMUSG00000006585
UniProt	Q9H211	Q8R4E9
RefSeq (mRNA)	NM_030928	NM_026014
RefSeq (protein)	NP_112190	NP_080290
Location (UCSC)	Chr 16: 88.8 – 88.81 Mb	Chr 8: 123.29 – 123.3 Mb
PubMed search
- Wikidata
View/Edit Human	View/Edit Mouse

CDT1 (Chromatin licensing and DNA replication factor 1) is a protein that in humans is encoded by the CDT1 gene. It is a licensing factor that functions to limit DNA from replicating more than once per cell cycle.

== Role in pre-replication complexes ==
The protein encoded by this gene is a key licensing factor in the assembly of pre-replication complexes (pre-RC), which occurs during the G1 phase of the cell cycle. In the assembly of pre-RCs, origin recognition complexes (ORC1-6) recognize and bind to DNA replication origins. CDT1, along with the protein CDC6, are then recruited to the forming pre-RC, followed by minichromosome maintenance complexes (MCM2-7).

The activity of CDT1 during the cell cycle is tightly regulated during the S phase by the protein geminin, which inhibits it, and by SCF^{SKP2}, which ubiquinates the protein to tag it for proteasomal degradation. This regulation is important in preventing relicensing, thus ensuring that DNA is only replicated once per cell cycle.

== Orthologs ==
CDT1 belongs to a family of replication proteins conserved from yeast to humans. Examples of orthologs in other species include:

- S. pombe – CDT1 (CDC10-dependent transcript 1)
- Drosophila melanogaster – 'double parked' or Dup
- Xenopus laevis - CDT1

== Interactions ==
DNA replication factor CDT1 has been shown to interact with SKP2. Cdt1 is recruited by the origin recognition complex in origin licensing. Null-mutations for CDT1 are lethal in yeast; the spores undergo mitosis without DNA replication. The overexpression of CDT1 causes rereplication in H. sapiens, which activates the Chk1 pathway, preventing entry into mitosis.
