= Geminin =

Nuclear protein inhibiting DNA replication

GMNN
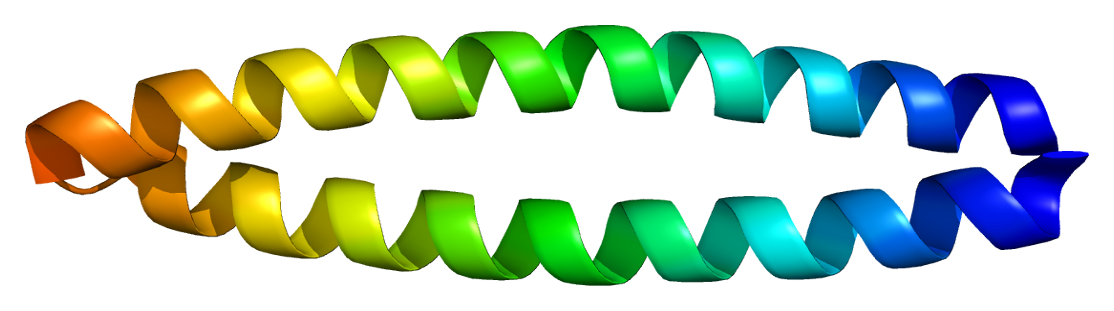

Identifiers
- Aliases: GMNN, Gem, MGORS6, geminin, DNA replication inhibitor, geminin DNA replication inhibitor
- External IDs: OMIM: 602842; MGI: 1927344; GeneCards: GMNN
Available structures
| PDB | Ortholog search: PDBe RCSB |
| PDB | List of PDB id codes 1T6F, 1UII, 2LP0, 2WVR, 4BRY |

Gene location (Human)
| Chr. | Chromosome 6 (human) |
| Band | 6p22.3 | Start | 24,774,931 bp |
| Band | 6p22.3 | End | 24,786,099 bp |

Gene location (Mouse)
| Chr. | Chromosome 13 (mouse) |
| Band | 13|13 A3.1 | Start | 24,935,828 bp |
| Band | 13|13 A3.1 | End | 24,945,906 bp |
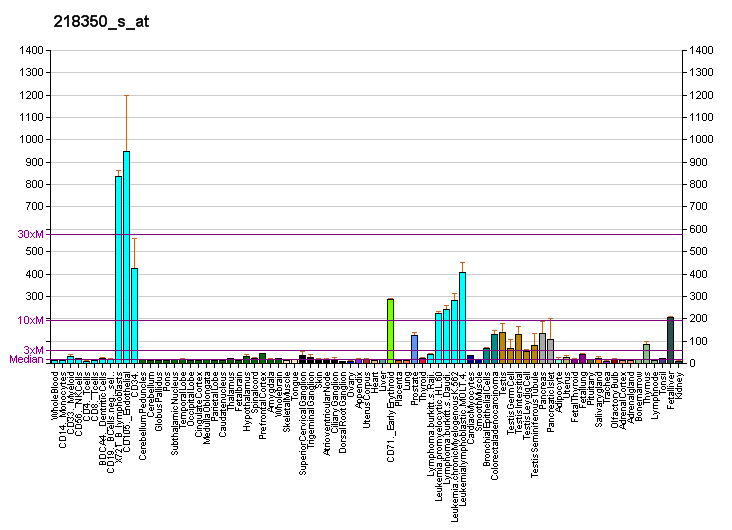
RNA expression pattern
| Bgee | Human / Mouse (ortholog); Top expressed in: oocyte; body of pancreas; secondary oocyte; gonad; mucosa of transverse colon; ventricular zone; embryo; rectum; ganglionic eminence; mucosa of sigmoid colon / Top expressed in: primitive streak; fetal liver hematopoietic progenitor cell; morula; yolk sac; Paneth cell; embryo; embryo; medial ganglionic eminence; blastocyst; epiblast; More reference expression data |
| BioGPS | More reference expression data |
Gene ontology
| Molecular function | histone deacetylase binding; protein binding; transcription corepressor activity; chromatin binding |
| Cellular component | cytoplasm; nucleus; nucleoplasm; cytosol |
| Biological process | animal organ morphogenesis; cell cycle; negative regulation of cell cycle; negative regulation of DNA replication; negative regulation of transcription, DNA-templated; regulation of DNA replication; positive regulation of chromatin binding; DNA replication preinitiation complex assembly; negative regulation of DNA-dependent DNA replication; protein-containing complex assembly; G1/S transition of mitotic cell cycle |
Sources:Amigo / QuickGO
Orthologs
| Databases | NCBI: entry; OMA: entry |
| Species | Human | Mouse |
| Entrez | 51053 | 57441 |
| Ensembl | ENSG00000112312 | ENSMUSG00000006715 |
| UniProt | O75496 | O88513 |
| RefSeq (mRNA) | NM_001251989; NM_001251990; NM_001251991; NM_015895 | NM_020567 |
| RefSeq (protein) | NP_001238918; NP_001238919; NP_001238920; NP_056979 | NP_065592 |
| Location (UCSC) | Chr 6: 24.77 – 24.79 Mb | Chr 13: 24.94 – 24.95 Mb |
| PubMed search |
- Wikidata
| View/Edit Human | View/Edit Mouse |

Geminin, DNA replication inhibitor, also known as GMNN, is a protein in humans encoded by the GMNN gene. A nuclear protein present in most eukaryotes and highly conserved across species, numerous functions have been elucidated for geminin including roles in metazoan cell cycle, cellular proliferation, cell lineage commitment, and neural differentiation. One example of its function is the inhibition of Cdt1.

== History ==
Geminin was originally identified as an inhibitor of DNA replication and substrate of the anaphase-promoting complex. Coincidentally, geminin was also shown to expand the neural plate in the developing Xenopus embryo.

== Structure ==
Geminin is a nuclear protein made up of about 200 amino acids, with a molecular weight of approximately 25 kDa. It contains an atypical leucine zipper coiled-coil domain. It has no known enzymatic activity nor DNA binding motifs.

== Function ==
=== Cell cycle control ===
Geminin is absent during G_{1} phase and accumulates through S, G_{2} phase and M phases of the cell cycle. Geminin levels drop at the metaphase-anaphase transition of mitosis when it is degraded by the anaphase-promoting complex.

==== S phase ====
During S phase, geminin is a negative regulator of DNA replication. In many cancer cell lines, inhibition of geminin by RNA interference results in re-replication of portions of the genome, which leads to aneuploidy. In these cell lines, geminin knockdown leads to markedly slowed growth and apoptosis within several days. However, the same is not true for primary and immortalized human cell lines, where other mechanisms exists to prevent DNA re-replication. Since geminin knockdown leads to cell death in many cancer cell lines but not primary cell lines, it has been proposed as a potential therapeutic target for cancer treatment.

==== Mitosis ====
At the start of the S-phase until late mitosis, geminin inhibits the replication factor Cdt1, preventing the assembly of the pre-replication complex. In early G1, the anaphase promoting complex triggers its destruction through ubiquitination.

Geminin, therefore, is an important player in ensuring that exactly one round of replication occurs during each cell cycle.

=== Developmental control ===
Geminin promotes early neural fate commitment by hyperacetylating chromatin. This effect allows neural genes to be accessible for transcription, promoting the expression of these genes. Ultimately, geminin allows cells uncommitted to any particular lineage to acquire neural characteristics.

Geminin has also been shown to interact with the SWI/SNF chromatin remodeling complex. In neural precursor cells, high levels of geminin prevent terminal differentiation. When the interaction between geminin and SWI/SNF is eliminated, geminin's inhibition to this process is eliminated and neural precursors are allowed to differentiate.

== Clinical significance ==
Geminin has been found to be overexpressed in several malignancies and cancer cell lines, while there is data demonstrating that geminin acts as a tumor suppressor by safeguarding genome stability.
