= The Voice Kids (Polish TV series) series 2 =

The Voice Kids
- Series 2
- Hosted by: Tomasz Kammel; Barbara Kurdej-Szatan; Jan Dąbrowski (V Reporter)
- Judges: Tomson & Baron; Dawid Kwiatkowski; Cleo
- Winner: Anna Dąbrowska

Release
- Original network: TVP2
- Original release: January 1 – February 23, 2019

Series chronology
- ← Previous; Series 1 Next → Series 3

The Voice Kids is a Polish reality music talent show for aspiring singers aged 8 to 15. Airing on the TVP 2 television network, this is part of the international syndication The Voice based on the reality singing competition launched in the Netherlands as The Voice Kids, created by Dutch television producer John de Mol. Tomson and Baron and Dawid Kwiatkowski again took over as trainers. Cleo joined them, replacing Edyta Górniak. The leaders remained unchanged. The second season premiered on New Year's Day 2019 and was won by 14-years-old Anna Dąbrowska from Wesoła. This marked Cleo win.

== Coaches ==
Coaches gallery

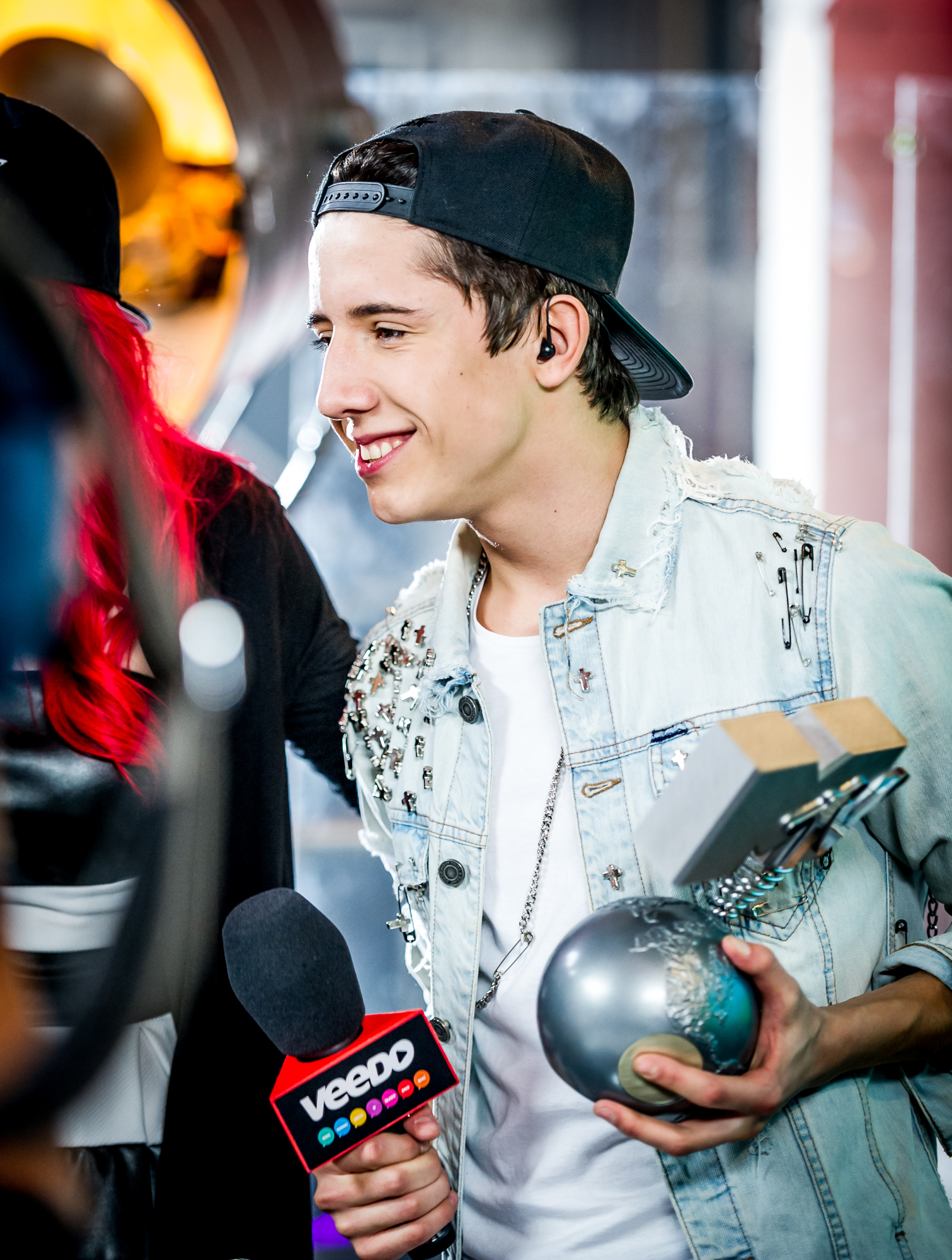
Dawid Kwiatkowski

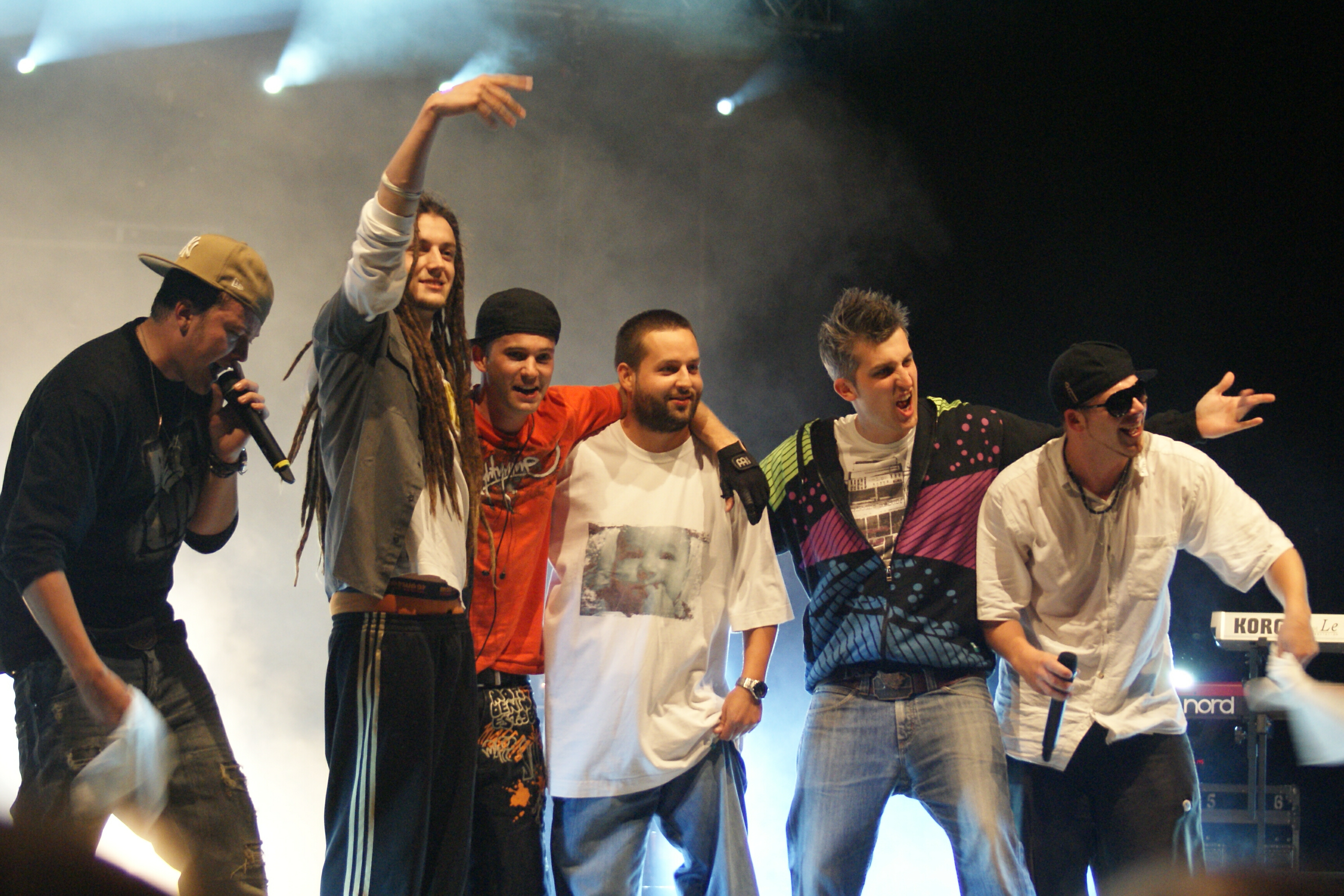
Tomson & Baron

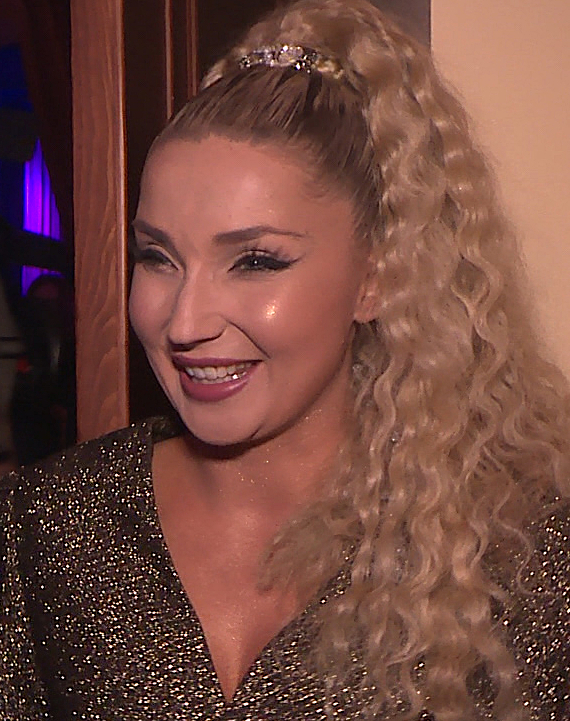
Cleo

== Teams ==
Colour key

- Winner
- Runner-up
- Third Place
- Winner of the online plebiscite
- Eliminated in the Final
- Eliminated in the Sing-offs
- Eliminated in the Battle rounds

Coaches	Top 54 Artists				
Dawid Kwiatkowski					
Dawid Kwiatkowski	Paweł Szymański	Oliwier Szot	Carla Fernandes	Hanna Lasota	Julia Drożdzyńska
Dawid Kwiatkowski	Wiktoria Skowron	Adam Kubera	Nikola Smutek	Sonia Jarema	Piotr Nowak
Dawid Kwiatkowski	Zuzanna Grodzka	Aurelia Radecka	Sebastian Walento	Tomasz Kolbusz	Nina Kicińska
Dawid Kwiatkowski	Daria Domitrz	Maja Czepczyńska	Olivier Woźnicki		
Tomson & Baron					
Tomson & Baron	Wiktoria Gabor	Lena Marzec	Michał Szczurek	Julia Kozik	Amelia Jaworowska
Tomson & Baron	Łucja Kania	Sebastian Radzimski	Dominika Stec	Mateusz Golicki	Nandi Lewandowska
Tomson & Baron	Pola Deptuła	Maria Nowak	Oliwia Tomczyk	Mateusz Subocz	Gabrysia Grzyb
Tomson & Baron	Elena Jakubiec	Stasiek Kukulski	Aleksandra Pasek		
Cleo					
Cleo	Anna Dąbrowska	Karolina Kruk	Adrian Bałucki	Oliwia Walicka	Daria Dąbkowska
Cleo	Elena Ewangelopulu	Anna Rom	Dominik Ciach	Natalia Tylek	Julia Bińczyk
Cleo	Julia Chmielarska	Bartosz Klęba	Remek Janicki	Eliza Gąsiorowska	Gabriela Jeleń
Cleo	Jasmina Szymańska	Julia Borowik	Krystian Koronka		

== Blind auditions ==
Color key

✔	Coach hit his/her "I WANT YOU" button
	Artist defaulted to this coach's team
	Artist elected to join this coach's team
	Artist eliminated with no coach pressing his or her "I WANT YOU" button

=== Episode 1 (January 1, 2019) ===
Roksana Węgiel, Zuza Jabłońska and 4Dreamers performed "Nie Poddam Się" at the start of the show.

Order	Artist	Age	Song	Coach's and contestant's choices		
Order	Artist	Age	Song	Dawid	Tomson & Baron	Cleo
1	Karolina Kruk	14	In My Blood	✔	✔	✔
2	Nina Kicińska	10	Naprawdę chcę	✔	✔	✔
3	Julia Prus	13	A Thousand Years	—	—	—
4	Remek Janicki	14	Photograph	✔	—	✔
5	Pola Deptuła	13	Rather Be	✔	✔	✔
6	Adam Kubera	15	As Long as You Love Me	✔	✔	✔

=== Episode 2 (January 1, 2019) ===
Roksana Węgiel performed "Obiecuję" at the start of the show.

Order	Artist	Age	Song	Coach's and contestant's choices		
Order	Artist	Age	Song	Dawid	Tomson & Baron	Cleo
1	Maria Nowak	12	Billionaire	—	✔	✔
2	Bartosz Klęba	10	Miłość rośnie wokół nas	—	—	✔
3	Julia Konopko	14	Kołysanka dla nieznajomej	—	—	—
4	Olivier Woźnicki	11	Marry You	✔	✔	✔
5	Oliwia Tomczyk	15	It's My Life	—	✔	✔
6	Oliwier Szot	10	Ulepimy dziś bałwana	✔	✔	✔

=== Episode 3 (January 5, 2019) ===
Order	Artist	Age	Song	Coach's and contestant's choices		
Order	Artist	Age	Song	Dawid	Tomson & Baron	Cleo
1	Julia Drożdzyńska	14	One Moment in Time	✔	✔	✔
2	Mateusz Subocz	13	Always on My Mind	—	✔	—
3	Julia Pluto-Prondzinska	8	Śpij kochanie, śpij	—	—	—
4	Michał Szczurek	13	King	—	✔	✔
5	Oliwia Walicka	13	Let Me Love You	✔	—	✔
6	Daria Dąbkowska	15	Kolorowy wiatr	✔	—	✔
7	Lena Marzec	10	Nobody's Perfect	✔	✔	✔

=== Episode 4 (January 5, 2019) ===
Order	Artist	Age	Song	Coach's and contestant's choices		
Order	Artist	Age	Song	Dawid	Tomson & Baron	Cleo
1	Wiktoria Skowron	13	Personal	✔	✔	—
2	Natalia Tylek	11	Znak	—	✔	✔
3	Hanna Lasota	12	Perfect Strangers	✔	✔	✔
4	Iwo Bors	13	Nice	—	—	—
5	Anna Rom	14	You & I	—	✔	✔
6	Elena Jakubiec	9	True Colors	—	✔	—
7	Julia Kozik	15	Flames	✔	✔	✔

=== Episode 5 (January 12, 2019) ===
Zuza Jabłońska performed "Ślad" at the start of the show.

Order	Artist	Age	Song	Coach's and contestant's choices		
Order	Artist	Age	Song	Dawid	Tomson & Baron	Cleo
1	Elena Ewangelopulu	12	Man of the Woods	✔	—	✔
2	Nandi Lewandowska	15	Cool Me Down	—	✔	✔
3	Nell Ryan	15	Malibu	—	—	—
4	Piotr Nowak	14	Na zawsze	✔	—	✔
5	Sonia Jarema	11	I Want to Know What Love Is	✔	—	—
6	Sebastian Radzimski	13	Highway to Hell	✔	✔	✔

=== Episode 6 (January 12, 2019) ===
Order	Artist	Age	Song	Coach's and contestant's choices		
Order	Artist	Age	Song	Dawid	Tomson & Baron	Cleo
1	Dominik Ciach	13	Kołysanka Dla Nieznajomej	—	—	✔
2	Julia Bińczyk	14	Say You Love Me	—	—	✔
3	Karol Górski	12	Livin' La Vida Loca	—	—	—
4	Amelia Jaworowska	11	Naprawdę Chcę	—	✔	✔
5	Zuzanna Grodzka	15	Addicted to You	✔	—	✔
6	Julia Chmielarska	14	Against All Odds	✔	✔	✔
7	Nikola Smutek	9	Znowu Pada Deszcz	✔	✔	✔

=== Episode 7 (January 19, 2019) ===
Order	Artist	Age	Song	Coach's and contestant's choices		
Order	Artist	Age	Song	Dawid	Tomson & Baron	Cleo
1	Aurelia Radecka	9	Nie ma miłości bez zazdrości	✔	✔	✔
2	Anna Dąbrowska	13	Hurt	✔	✔	✔
3	Adrian Bałucki	14	I'm Not The Only One	✔	—	✔
4	Dominika Stec	14	Run to You	—	✔	✔
5	Sebastian Walento	11	Znowu pada deszcz	✔	—	✔
6	Nicola Gondor	13	Friends	—	—	—
7	Wiktoria Gabor	12	Roar	✔	✔	✔

=== Episode 8 (January 19, 2019) ===
Order	Artist	Age	Song	Coach's and contestant's choices		
Order	Artist	Age	Song	Dawid	Tomson & Baron	Cleo
1	Łucja Kania	11	Say Something	✔	✔	✔
2	Tomasz Kolbusz	13	Marry You	✔	—	✔
3	Gabriela Jeleń	14	The Climb	—	—	✔
4	Eliza Gąsiorowska	15	W stronę słońca	✔	✔	✔
5	Mateusz Golicki	14	Nic tu po mnie	—	✔	✔
6	Julia Wincenciak	12	Havana	—	—	—

=== Episode 9 (January 26, 2019) ===
Order	Artist	Age	Song	Coach's and contestant's choices		
Order	Artist	Age	Song	Dawid	Tomson & Baron	Cleo
1	Maja Czepczyńska	14	Always On My Mind	✔	—	✔
2	Ola Pasek	14	Księżniczka	✔	✔	—
3	Daria Domitrz	13	Listen	✔	✔	✔
4	Krystian Koronka	13	Mama	—	—	✔
5	Gabriela Grzyb	12	Nie wierz mi, nie ufaj mi	✔	✔	✔
6	Julia Stefanowska	7	Pszczółka Maja	—	—	—
7	Carla Fernandes	15	Thinking Out Loud	✔	✔	✔

=== Episode 10 (January 26, 2019) ===
Order	Artist	Age	Song	Coach's and contestant's choices		
Order	Artist	Age	Song	Dawid	Tomson & Baron	Cleo
1	Julia Borowik	12	Lustra	✔	✔	✔
2	Jakub Jóźwik	12	Tears In Heaven	—	—	—
3	Jasmina Szymańska	14	I Want To Know What Love Is	✔	—	✔
4	Staś Kukulski	11	1000 metrów nad ziemią	✔	✔	✔
5	Iga Wojciechowska	13	Szaloną być	—	—	—
6	Paweł Szymański	11	I Have Nothing	✔	✔	✔

== The Battle Rounds ==
Color key

Artist won the Battle and advances to the Sing offs
Artist lost the Battle and was eliminated

=== Episode 11: Team Tomson & Baron (February 2, 2019) ===
The Tomson & Baron's group performed "Zaufaj" at the start of the show.

Episode	Coach	Order	Winner(s)	Song	Losers	
Episode 11 (February 2, 2019)	Tomson & Baron	1	Wiktoria Gabor	Problem	Maria Nowak	Oliwia Tomczyk
Episode 11 (February 2, 2019)	Tomson & Baron	2	Amelia Jaworowska	Wieża Babel	Gabrysia Grzyb	Mateusz Subocz
Episode 11 (February 2, 2019)	Tomson & Baron	3	Julia Kozik	Unconditionally	Ola Pasek	Dominika Stec
Episode 11 (February 2, 2019)	Tomson & Baron	4	Michał Szczurek	Byle Jak	Pola Deptuła	Nandi Lewandowska
Episode 11 (February 2, 2019)	Tomson & Baron	5	Łucja Kania	Iris	Sebastian Radzimski	Mateusz Golicki
Episode 11 (February 2, 2019)	Tomson & Baron	6	Lena Marzec	ABC	Staś Kukulski	Elena Jakubiec

Sing offs

Episode	Coach	Order	Artist	Song	Result
Episode 11 (February 2, 2019)	Tomson & Baron	1	Łucja Kania	Say Something	Eliminated
Episode 11 (February 2, 2019)	Tomson & Baron	2	Amelia Jaworowska	Naprawdę chcę	Eliminated
Episode 11 (February 2, 2019)	Tomson & Baron	3	Julia Kozik	Flames	Eliminated
Episode 11 (February 2, 2019)	Tomson & Baron	4	Michał Szczurek	King	Advanced
Episode 11 (February 2, 2019)	Tomson & Baron	5	Wiktoria Gabor	Roar	Advanced
Episode 11 (February 2, 2019)	Tomson & Baron	6	Lena Marzec	Nobody's Perfect	Advanced

=== Episode 12: Team Cleo (February 9, 2019) ===
The Cleo's group performed "Łowcy Gwiazd" at the start of the show.

Episode	Coach	Order	Winner(s)	Song	Losers	
Episode 12 (February 9, 2019)	Cleo	1	Oliwia Walicka	Piechotą do lata	Natalia Tylek	Bartosz Klęba
Episode 12 (February 9, 2019)	Cleo	2	Karolina Kruk	Treat You Better	Remek Janicki	Julia Bińczyk
Episode 12 (February 9, 2019)	Cleo	3	Daria Dąbkowska	Pod wiatr	Krystian Koronka	Dominik Ciach
Episode 12 (February 9, 2019)	Cleo	4	Elena Ewangelopulu	Ain't No Mountain High Enough	Eliza Gąsiorowska	Julia Borowik
Episode 12 (February 9, 2019)	Cleo	5	Adrian Bałucki	One Sweet Day	Julia Chmielarska	Jasmina Szymańska
Episode 12 (February 9, 2019)	Cleo	6	Anna Dąbrowska	I Wanna Dance with Somebody	Anna Rom	Gabriela Jeleń

Sing offs

Episode	Coach	Order	Artist	Song	Result
Episode 12 (February 9, 2019)	Cleo	1	Oliwia Walicka	Let Me Love You	Eliminated
Episode 12 (February 9, 2019)	Cleo	2	Karolina Kruk	In My Blood	Advanced
Episode 12 (February 9, 2019)	Cleo	3	Daria Dąbkowska	Kolorowy wiatr	Eliminated
Episode 12 (February 9, 2019)	Cleo	4	Adrian Bałucki	I'm Not the Only One	Advanced
Episode 12 (February 9, 2019)	Cleo	5	Elena Ewangelopulu	Man of the Woods	Eliminated
Episode 12 (February 9, 2019)	Cleo	6	Anna Dąbrowska	Hurt	Advanced

=== Episode 13: Team Dawid Kwiatkowski (February 16, 2019) ===
The Dawid's group performed "Rozpalimy ogień" at the start of the show.

Episode	Coach	Order	Winner(s)	Song	Losers	
Episode 13 (February 16, 2019)	Dawid Kwiatkowski	1	Wiktoria Skowron	Początek	Maja Czepczyńska	Piotr Nowak
Episode 13 (February 16, 2019)	Dawid Kwiatkowski	2	Carla Fernandes	Give Me Love	Adam Kubera	Zuzanna Grodzka
Episode 13 (February 16, 2019)	Dawid Kwiatkowski	3	Julia Drożdzyńska	What About Us	Sonia Jarema	Daria Domitrz
Episode 13 (February 16, 2019)	Dawid Kwiatkowski	4	Oliwier Szot	Uh La La La	Aurelia Radecka	Nina Kicińska
Episode 13 (February 16, 2019)	Dawid Kwiatkowski	5	Hanna Lasota	Odkryjemy miłość nieznaną	Sebastian Walento	Nikola Smutek
Episode 13 (February 16, 2019)	Dawid Kwiatkowski	6	Paweł Szymański	Can We Dance	Olivier Woźnicki	Tomasz Kolbusz

Sing offs

Episode	Coach	Order	Artist	Song	Result
Episode 13 (February 16, 2019)	Dawid Kwiatkowski	1	Wiktoria Skowron	Personal	Eliminated
Episode 13 (February 16, 2019)	Dawid Kwiatkowski	2	Carla Fernandes	Thinking Out Loud	Advanced
Episode 13 (February 16, 2019)	Dawid Kwiatkowski	3	Julia Drożdzyńska	One Moment in Time	Eliminated
Episode 13 (February 16, 2019)	Dawid Kwiatkowski	4	Hanna Lasota	Perfect Strangers	Eliminated
Episode 13 (February 16, 2019)	Dawid Kwiatkowski	5	Oliwier Szot	Ulepimy dziś bałwana	Advanced
Episode 13 (February 16, 2019)	Dawid Kwiatkowski	6	Paweł Szymański	I Have Nothing	Advanced

== Episode 14 Finale (23 February) ==
Color key

Artist was chosen by his/her coach
Artist was eliminated by his/her coach

=== Round 1 ===
Order	Coach	Artist	Song	Result
1	Tomson & Baron	Lena Marzec	Listen	Eliminated
2	Tomson & Baron	Michał Szczurek	Na chwilę	Eliminated
3	Tomson & Baron	Wiktoria Gabor	Who You Are	Tomson & Baron Choice
1	Cleo	Karolina Kruk	Impossible	Eliminated
2	Cleo	Ania Dąbrowska	Świat się pomylił	Cleo's Choice
3	Cleo	Adrian Bałucki	End of the Road	Eliminated
1	Dawid Kwiatkowski	Carla Fernandes	Scars to Your Beautiful	Eliminated
2	Dawid Kwiatkowski	Oliwier Szot	Weź nie pytaj	Eliminated
3	Dawid Kwiatkowski	Paweł Szymański	I Don't Want to Miss a Thing	Dawid's Choice

=== Round 2 ===
Each contestant performed a duet with their judge and their original song.

Coach	Artist	Order	Duet song	Order	Original song	Result
Tomson & Baron	Wiktoria Gabor	1	Human	4	Time	Runner-Up
Cleo	Anna Dąbrowska	2	Hero	5	Małe skrzydła	Winner
Dawid Kwiatkowski	Paweł Szymański	3	Mirrors	6	10 lat	Third Place

== Elimination chart ==
Colour key
Artist's info

- Artist from Team Tomson & Baron
- Artist from Team Dawid Kwiatkowski
- Artist from Team Cleo

Result details

- Winner
- Runner-up
- Third Place
- Artist was saved by the public
- Artist was saved by his/her coach
- Artist was eliminated by his/her coach

Sing-offs and Live show results per week
Artist	The Sing-offs			Live shows	
Artist	Episode 11	Episode 12	Episode 13	Finals	
Artist	Episode 11	Episode 12	Episode 13	Round 1	Round 2
Anna Dąbrowska	—N/a	Safe	—N/a	Safe	Winner
Wiktoria Gabor	Safe	—N/a		Safe	Runner-up
Paweł Szymański	—N/a		Safe	Safe	Third Place
Lena Marzec	Safe	—N/a		Eliminated (Finals)	—N/a
Michał Szczurek	Safe	—N/a		Eliminated (Finals)	—N/a
Adrian Bałucki	—N/a	Safe	—N/a	Eliminated (Finals)	—N/a
Karolina Kruk	—N/a	Safe	—N/a	Eliminated (Finals)	—N/a
Oliwier Szot	—N/a		Safe	Eliminated (Finals)	—N/a
Carla Fernandes	—N/a		Safe	Eliminated (Finals)	—N/a
Hanna Lasota	—N/a		Eliminated (week 3)	—N/a	
Julia Drożdzyńska	—N/a		Eliminated (week 3)	—N/a	
Wiktoria Skowron	—N/a		Eliminated (week 3)	—N/a	
Oliwia Walicka	—N/a	Eliminated (week 2)	—N/a		
Daria Dąbkowska	—N/a	Eliminated (week 2)	—N/a		
Elena Ewangelopulu	—N/a	Eliminated (week 2)	—N/a		
Julia Kozik	Eliminated (week 1)	—N/a			
Amelia Jaworowska	Eliminated (week 1)	—N/a			
Łucja Kania	Eliminated (week 1)	—N/a			

=== Teams ===
Color key
Artist's info

- Team Dawid
- Team Cleo
- Team Tomson & Baron

Results details

- Winner
- Runner-up
- Third Place
- Eliminated

Artist	Battles	Sing Offs	Finale Part 1	Finale Part 2
Paweł Szymański	Coach's choice	Coach's choice	Coach's choice	Third Place
Carla Fernandez	Coach's choice	Coach's choice	Eliminated	
Oliwier Szot	Coach's choice	Coach's choice	Eliminated	
Hanna Lasota	Coach's choice	Eliminated		
Julia Drożdzyńska	Coach's choice	Eliminated		
Wiktoria Skowron	Coach's choice	Eliminated		
Ania Dąbrowska	Coach's choice	Coach's choice	Coach's choice	Winner
Karolina Kruk	Coach's choice	Coach's choice	Eliminated	
Adrian Bałucki	Coach's choice	Coach's choice	Eliminated	
Oliwia Walicka	Coach's choice	Eliminated		
Daria Dąbkowska	Coach's choice	Eliminated		
Elena Ewangelopulu	Coach's choice	Eliminated		
Wiktoria Gabor	Coach's choice	Coach's choice	Coach's choice	Runner-up
Lena Marzec	Coach's choice	Coach's choice	Eliminated	
Michał Szczurek	Coach's choice	Coach's choice	Eliminated	
Julia Kozik	Coach's choice	Eliminated		
Amelia Jaworowska	Coach's choice	Eliminated		
Łucja Kania	Coach's choice	Eliminated		
