= The Voice Kids (Polish TV series) series 5 =

The Voice Kids
- Series 5
- Hosted by: Tomasz Kammel; Ida Nowakowska-Herndon
- Judges: Tomson & Baron; Dawid Kwiatkowski; Cleo
- Winner: Mateusz Krzykała

Release
- Original network: TVP 2
- Original release: February 26 – April 23, 2022

Series chronology
- ← Previous; Series 4

The Voice Kids is a Polish reality music talent show for aspiring singers aged 8 to 14, airing on TVP 2. The fifth season premiered on February 26, 2022. Tomson & Baron, Dawid Kwiatkowski and Cleo returned as the coaches. Tomasz Kammel returned as host, alongside Ida Nowakowska-Herndon. Mateusz Krzykała won the season, marking Cleo’s second win as a coach.

== Coaches ==
Coaches gallery

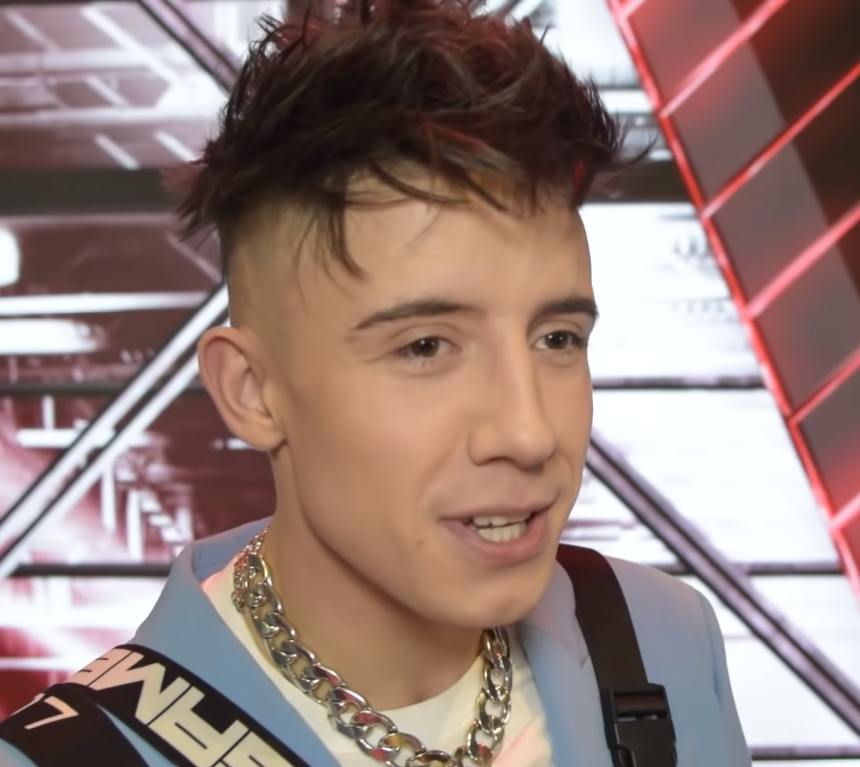
Dawid Kwiatkowski

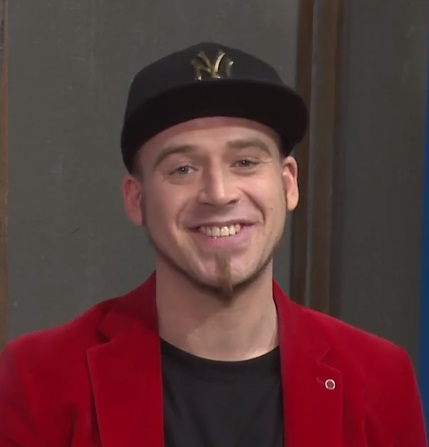
Tomasz Lach

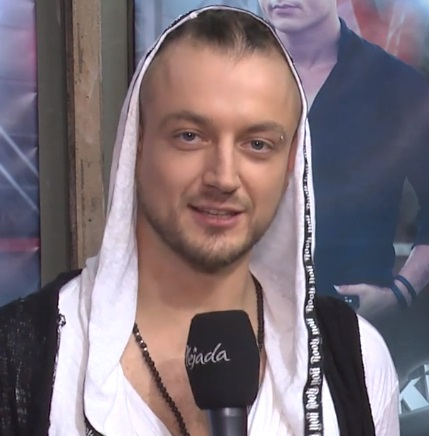
Aleksander Milwiw-Baron

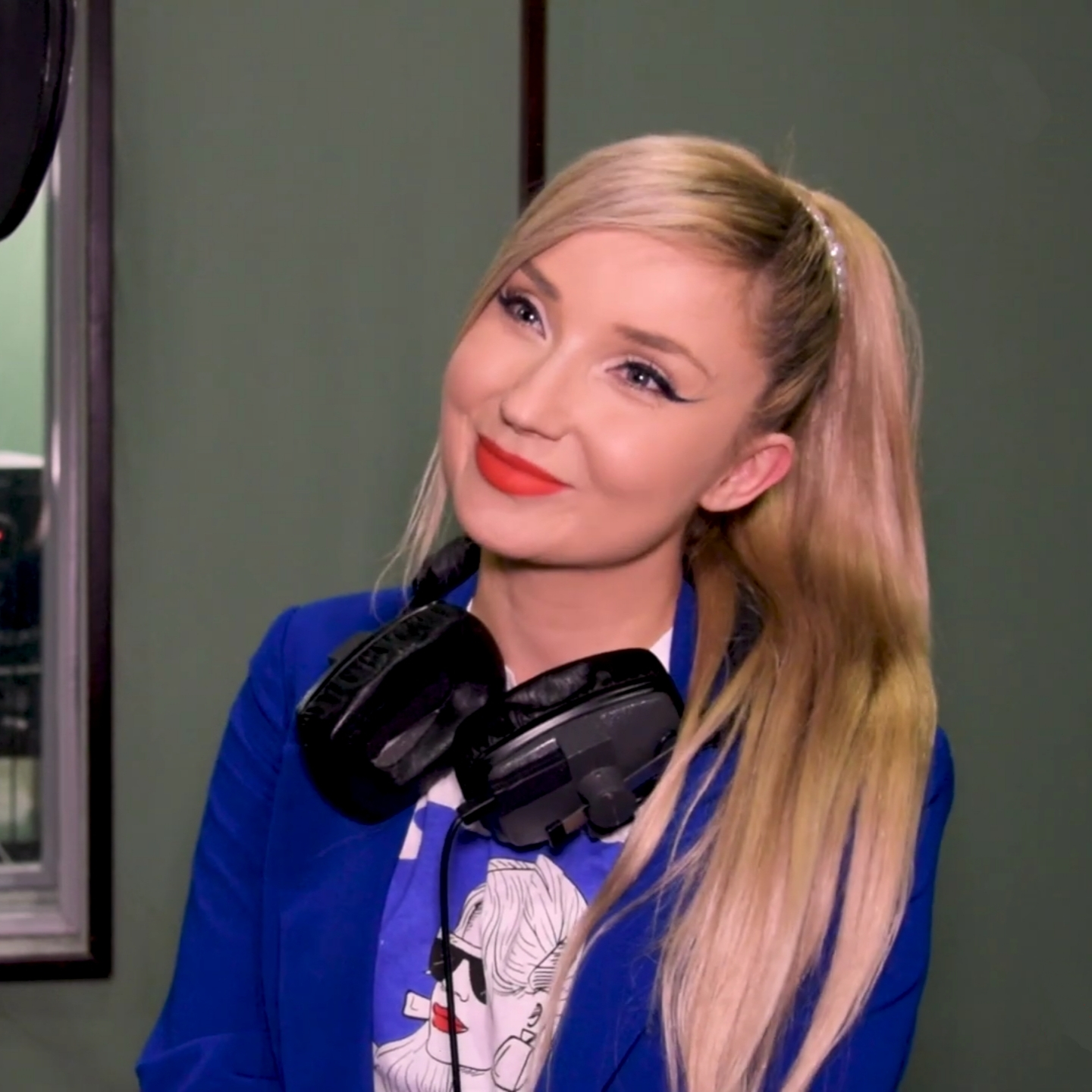
Cleo

== Teams ==
Colour key

- Winner
- Runner-up
- Winner of the online plebiscite
- Eliminated in the final
- Eliminated in the sing-offs
- Eliminated in the battle rounds
- Withdrew

Coaches	Top 54 artists					
Dawid Kwiatkowski						
Dawid Kwiatkowski	Alicja Górzyńska	Piotrek Pączkowski	Laura Bączkiewicz	Antosia Kraszewska	Witek Piasecki	Magda Maciołek
Dawid Kwiatkowski	Natalia Wagasewicz	Lena Ornowska	Matyna Klimek	Amelia Kuształa	Marceli Józefowicz	Aleksander Ryś
Dawid Kwiatkowski	Oktawia Mazur	Olek Maląg	Laura Milczarek	Natalia Rabczuk	Lena Tylus	Zuzanna Gajor
Tomson & Baron						
Tomson & Baron	Maja Cembrzyńska	Ida Wargskog	Tosia Zakrzewska	Marcel Kotula	Maja Janowska	Kornelia Markuszewska
Tomson & Baron	Wiktoria Taracińska	Mieszko Serwatowicz	Martyna Gregorczyk	Basia Dubyk	Magdalena Piątek	Julianna Kytowa
Tomson & Baron	Oliwia Gręzak	Dawid Nowak	Marysia Miszk	Patrycja Piech	Witek Ptak	Karolina Kutypa
Cleo						
Cleo	Mateusz Krzykała	Julia Bieniek	Max Kononow	Paulina Knapik	Karolina Mikołajczak	Nadia Machała
Cleo	Patrycja Kulicka	Amelka Jakób	Emilia Głodek	Piotrek Pawłowski	Marika Brdękiewicz	Franek Płatek
Cleo	Julia Sechman	Julia Mika	Wojtek Malinowski	Hania Janicka	Laura Bogieł	Zuzanna Górecka

== Blind auditions ==
Color key

Coach hit his/her "I WANT YOU" button
Coach did not press the "I WANT YOU" button
Artist defaulted to this coach's team
Artist elected to join this coach's team
Artist eliminated with no coach pressing his or her "I WANT YOU" button
Artist is an 'Allstar' contestant

=== Episode 1 (February 26, 2022) ===
Ania Dąbrowska, Marcin Maciejczak and Sara Egwu-James performed "Lecę"

Order	Artist	Age	Song	Coach's and contestant's choices		
Order	Artist	Age	Song	Dawid	Tomson & Baron	Cleo
1	Witek Piasecki	11	„Fiołkowe pole” – Sobel			
2	Ida Wargskog	12	„Can't Help Falling In Love” – Elvis Presley			
3	Mieszko Tuliszka	13	„Czułe miejsce” – Baranovsky			
4	Lena Ornowska	9	„Bursztynek” – Fasolki			
5	Patrycja Kulicka	12	„Prawda o nas” – Sylwia Grzeszczak			
6	Witek Ptak	9	„Na wyspach Bergamutach”			

=== Episode 2 (February 26, 2022) ===
Roksana Węgiel performed "Korona"

Order	Artist	Age	Song	Coach's and contestant's choices		
Order	Artist	Age	Song	Dawid	Tomson & Baron	Cleo
1	Martyna Klimek	13	„Karmelove” – Marcelina feat. Piotr Rogucki			
2	Emilia Głodek	11	„I Knew You Were Trouble” – Taylor Swift			
3	Mieszko Serwatowicz	12	„Tylko wróć” – Wojciech Gąssowski			
4	Amelka Jakób	8	„Girls Just Want To Have Fun” – Cyndi Lauper			
5	Wiktoria Taracińska	13	„Holding Out For A Hero” – Bonnie Tyler			
6	Nikola Baran	12	„Unstoppable” – Sia			
7	Max Kononow	13	„Driver License” – Olivia Rodrigo			

=== Episode 3 (March 5, 2022) ===
Natalia Kawalec performed "Not Giving Up"

Order	Artist	Age	Song	Coach's and contestant's choices		
Order	Artist	Age	Song	Dawid	Tomson & Baron	Cleo
1	Laura Bąkiewicz	10	„Dancing Queen” – ABBA			
2	Karolina Mikołajczak	14	„Adagio” – Lara Fabian			
3	Piotrek Pawłowski	12	„King Bruce Lee karate mistrz” – Franek Kimono			
4	Magda Maciołek	12	„Scarlett” – LemON			
5	Maja Bielak	11	„Jeszcze Cię nie ma” – Tulia			
6	Antosia Kraszewska	11	„Fight Song” – Rachel Platten			
7	Mateusz Krzykała	13	„Little Bit Of Love” – Tom Grennan			

=== Episode 4 (March 5, 2022) ===
Order	Artist	Age	Song	Coach's and contestant's choices		
Order	Artist	Age	Song	Dawid	Tomson & Baron	Cleo
1	Amelia Kuształa	14	„Electric" – Katy Perry			
2	Kornelia Markuszewska	13	„It's My Life" – Bon Jovi			
3	Natalia Wagasewicz	13	„Tomorrow”			
4	Natalka Bytner	9	„Rolling in the Deep" – Adele			
5	Maja Cembrzyńska	13	"Superhero" – Viki Gabor			
6	Marceli Józefowicz	13	"Spragniony" – Kamil Bednarek			

=== Episode 5 (March 12, 2022) ===
Jakub Szmajkowski performed "Nieskończone"

Order	Artist	Age	Song	Coach's and contestant's choices		
Order	Artist	Age	Song	Dawid	Tomson & Baron	Cleo
1	Martyna Gregorczyk	13	"Idelnie" – Sound'n'Grace			
2	Beniamin Nowacki	11	"Here I Go Again" – Whitesnake			
3	Marika Brdękiewicz	13	"I Will Always Love You" – Dolly Parton			
4	Aleksander Ryś	14	"Chwile jak te" – Kamil Bednarek			
5	Basia Dubyk	12	"Heartbeat" – Margaret			
6	Laura Milczarek	9	"Shotgun" – George Ezra			

=== Episode 6 (March 12, 2022) ===
Order	Artist	Age	Song	Coach's and contestant's choices		
Order	Artist	Age	Song	Dawid	Tomson & Baron	Cleo
1	Olek Maląg	12	"O sobie samym" – Robert Gawliński			
2	Magda Piątek	14	"Hello" – Adele			
3	Franek Płatek	9	"Futbol" – Maryla Rodowicz			
4	Julianna Kytowa	14	"Try" – P!nk			
5	Oktawia Mazur	14	"Wonder" – Shawn Mendes			
6	Agnieszka Szauer	10	"Baby Shark" – Hope Segoine			
7	Julia Bieniek	13	"Lovin' You" – Minnie Riperton			

=== Episode 7 (March 19, 2022) ===
Alicja Tracz performed "Nic nie musisz"

Order	Artist	Age	Song	Coach's and contestant's choices		
Order	Artist	Age	Song	Dawid	Tomson & Baron	Cleo
1	Marcel Kotuła	13	"Save the Last Dance for Me" – Michael Bublé			
2	Julia Sechman	14	"Górą Ty" – Golec uOrkiestra & Gromee			
3	Natalia Rabczuk	13	"Natural" – Imagine Dragons			
4	Mikołaj Gajowy	13	"Sofia" – Álvaro Soler			
5	Oliwia Gręzak	13	"Nie wierz mi, nie ufaj mi" – Anna Jantar			
6	Lena Tylus	10	"Halo" – Beyoncé			

=== Episode 8 (March 19, 2022) ===
Amelia Andryszczyk performed "Loczki"

Order	Artist	Age	Song	Coach's and contestant's choices		
Order	Artist	Age	Song	Dawid	Tomson & Baron	Cleo
1	Julia Mika	14	"Niebo to my" – Edyta Górniak			
2	Marysia Miszk	13	"Skin" – Rag'n'Bone Man			
3	Paulina Knapik	9	"Dear Future Husband" – Meghan Trainor			
4	Dawid Nowak	11	"Stacja Warszawa" – Lady Pank			
5	Pola Kuderska	14	"Boję się o Ciebie" – Kaśka Sochacka & Vito Bambino			
6	Wojtek Malinowski	14	"Nad przepaścią" – Bracia			

=== Episode 9 (March 26, 2022) ===
Wiktoria Zwolińska performed "Klony"

Order	Artist	Age	Song	Coach's and contestant's choices		
Order	Artist	Age	Song	Dawid	Tomson & Baron	Cleo
1	Zuza Górecka	13	"Love Again" – Dua Lipa			
2	Zuzia Gajor	13	"Zamigotał świat" – Varius Manx			
3	Sebastian Żuk	13	"Don't Start Now" – Dua Lipa			
4	Maja Janowska	13	"Breathin" – Ariana Grande			
5	Hania Janicka	14	"Falling" – Harry Styles			
6	Piotrek Pączkowski	13	"Story Of My Life" – One Direction			

=== Episode 10 (March 26, 2022) ===
Order	Artist	Age	Song	Coach's and contestant's choices		
Order	Artist	Age	Song	Dawid	Tomson & Baron	Cleo
1	Tosia Zakrzewska	12	"Who You Are" – Jessie J			
2	Laura Borgieł	12	"Getaway" – Viki Gabor			
3	Patrycja Piech	14	"Je Veux" – Zaz			
4	Nadia Machała	11	"Pogoda ducha" – Hanna Banaszak			
5	Karolina Kutypa	14	"Next To Me" – Imagine Dragons			
6	Iga Gregor	11	"Price Tag" – Jessie J			
7	Alicja Górzyńska	14	"Levitating" – Dua Lipa feat. DaBaby			

== The Battle Rounds ==
Color key

Artist won the Battle and advances to the Sing offs
Artist lost the Battle and was eliminated

=== Episode 11: Team Dawid (April 2, 2022) ===
The Dawid's group performed "Don't Worry, Be Happy" at the start of the show.

Episode	Coach	Order	Winner(s)	Song	Losers	
Episode 11 (April 2, 2022)	Dawid Kwiatkowski	1	Antosia Kraszewska	„Dance Monkey”	Amelia Kuształa	Zuzanna Gajor
Episode 11 (April 2, 2022)	Dawid Kwiatkowski	2	Alicja Górzyńska	„Arcade”	Oktawia Mazur	Natalia Rabczuk
Episode 11 (April 2, 2022)	Dawid Kwiatkowski	3	Witek Piasecki	„Ale jazz”	Lena Ornowska	Olek Maląg
Episode 11 (April 2, 2022)	Dawid Kwiatkowski	4	Magda Maciołek	„Hej Hej”	Martyna Klimek	Natalia Wagasewicz
Episode 11 (April 2, 2022)	Dawid Kwiatkowski	5	Laura Bączkiewicz	„Dobrze jest jak jest”	Lena Tylus	Laura Milczarek
Episode 11 (April 2, 2022)	Dawid Kwiatkowski	6	Piotrek Pączkowski	„Beneath Your Beautiful”	Aleksander Ryś	Marceli Józefowicz

Sing offs

Episode	Coach	Order	Artist	Song	Result
Episode 11 (April 2, 2022)	Dawid Kwiatkowski	1	Antosia Kraszewska	Fight Song	Eliminated
Episode 11 (April 2, 2022)	Dawid Kwiatkowski	2	Alicja Górzyńska	Levitating	Advanced
Episode 11 (April 2, 2022)	Dawid Kwiatkowski	3	Witek Piasecki	Fiołkowe pole	Eliminated
Episode 11 (April 2, 2022)	Dawid Kwiatkowski	4	Magda Maciołek	Scarlett	Eliminated
Episode 11 (April 2, 2022)	Dawid Kwiatkowski	5	Laura Bączkiewicz	Dancing Queen	Advanced
Episode 11 (April 2, 2022)	Dawid Kwiatkowski	6	Piotrek Pączkowski	Story Of My Life	Advanced

=== Episode 12: Team Cleo (April 9, 2022) ===
The Cleo's group performed "Bastet" at the start of the show.

Episode	Coach	Order	Winner(s)	Song	Losers	
Episode 12 (April 9, 2022)	Cleo	1	Paulina Knapik	"Afera"	Amelka Jakób	Franek Płatek
Episode 12 (April 9, 2022)	Cleo	2	Karolina Mikołajczak	"When You Believe”	Julia Mika	Zuzanna Górecka
Episode 12 (April 9, 2022)	Cleo	3	Mateusz Krzykała	"Someone You Loved”	Hania Janicka	Wojtek Malinowski
Episode 12 (April 9, 2022)	Cleo	4	Nadia Machała	"Za tobą pójdę jak na bal"	Julia Sechman	Piotrek Pawłowski
Episode 12 (April 9, 2022)	Cleo	5	Julia Bieniek	"The Winner Takes It All”	Marika Brdękiewicz	Laura Borgieł
Episode 12 (April 9, 2022)	Cleo	6	Max Kononow	"When I Was Your Man”	Emilia Głodek	Patrycja Kulicka

Sing offs

Episode	Coach	Order	Artist	Song	Result
Episode 12 (April 9, 2022)	Cleo	1	Paulina Knapik	Dear Future Husband	Eliminated
Episode 12 (April 9, 2022)	Cleo	2	Karolina Mikołajczak	Adagio	Eliminated
Episode 12 (April 9, 2022)	Cleo	3	Mateusz Krzykała	Little Bit Of Love	Advanced
Episode 12 (April 9, 2022)	Cleo	4	Nadia Machała	Pogoda Ducha	Eliminated
Episode 12 (April 9, 2022)	Cleo	5	Julia Bieniek	Lovin' You	Advanced
Episode 12 (April 9, 2022)	Cleo	6	Max Kononow	Drivers License	Advanced

=== Episode 13: Team Tomson & Baron (April 16, 2022) ===
The Tomson & Baron's group performed "With a Little Help from My Friends" at the start of the show.

Episode	Coach	Order	Winner(s)	Song	Losers	
Episode 13 (April 16, 2022)	Tomson & Baron	1	Ida Wargskog	"Heal the World"	Patrycja Piech	Oliwia Gręzak
Episode 13 (April 16, 2022)	Tomson & Baron	2	Marcel Kotuła	"Bądź moim natchnieniem”	Dawid Nowak	Mieszko Serwatowicz
Episode 13 (April 16, 2022)	Tomson & Baron	3	Maja Janowska	"Anywhere"	Wiktoria Taracińska	Magdalena Piątek
Episode 13 (April 16, 2022)	Tomson & Baron	4	Kornelia Markuszewska	"Strasznie już być tym królem chcę"	Witek Ptak	Barbara Dubyk
Episode 13 (April 16, 2022)	Tomson & Baron	5	Tosia Zakrzewska	"Głupcy"	Julianna Kytowa	Martyna Gregorczyk
Episode 13 (April 16, 2022)	Tomson & Baron	6	Maja Cembrzyńska	"I Don't Want to Miss a Thing"	Karolina Kutypa	Marysia Miszk

Sing offs

Episode	Coach	Order	Artist	Song	Result
Episode 13 (April 16, 2022)	Tomson & Baron	1	Ida Wargskog	Can't Help Falling In Love	Advanced
Episode 13 (April 16, 2022)	Tomson & Baron	2	Marcel Kotuła	Save the Last Dance for Me	Eliminated
Episode 13 (April 16, 2022)	Tomson & Baron	3	Maja Janowska	Breathin	Eliminated
Episode 13 (April 16, 2022)	Tomson & Baron	4	Kornelia Markuszewska	It's My Life	Eliminated
Episode 13 (April 16, 2022)	Tomson & Baron	5	Tosia Zakrzewska	Who You Are	Advanced
Episode 13 (April 16, 2022)	Tomson & Baron	6	Maja Cembrzyńska	Superhero	Advanced

== Finale ==
Color key

Artist was chosen by his/her coach
Artist was eliminated by his/her coach

=== Round 1 (April 23, 2022) ===
Order	Coach	Artist	Song	Result
1	Tomson & Baron	Tosia Zakrzewska	Hurt	Eliminated
2	Tomson & Baron	Ida Wargskog	Ale jestem	Eliminated
3	Tomson & Baron	Maja Cembrzyńska	Happier Than Ever	Tomson & Baron's Choice
1	Dawid Kwiatkowski	Alicja Górzyńska	Będę śniła	Dawid's Choice
2	Dawid Kwiatkowski	Laura Bąkiewicz	Conga	Eliminated
3	Dawid Kwiatkowski	Piotr Pączowski	In My Blood	Eliminated
1	Cleo	Mateusz Krzykała	Man in the Mirror	Cleo's Choice
2	Cleo	Julia Bieniek	The Power of Love	Eliminated
3	Cleo	Maximilian Kononow	Because of You	Eliminated

Each contestant performed a duet with their judge.

Order	Coach	Artist	Duet song
1	Tomson & Baron	Maja Cembrzyńska	Differences
2	Dawid Kwiatkowski	Alicja Górzyńska	Kto tam jest?
3	Cleo	Mateusz Krzykała	Zabiorę nas

=== Round 2 (April 23, 2022) ===
Each contestant performed a cover and their original song.

Order	Coach	Artist	English cover	Result
1	Tomson & Baron	Maja Cembrzyńska	Dziwny jest ten świat	Runner-up
2	Dawid Kwiatkowski	Alicja Górzyńska	I'll Never Love Again	Runner-up
3	Cleo	Mateusz Krzykała	Easy on Me	Winner

== Elimination chart ==
Colour key
Artist's info

- Artist from Team Tomson & Baron
- Artist from Team Dawid Kwiatkowski
- Artist from Team Cleo

- Winner
- Runner-up
- Artist was saved by his/her coach
- Artist was eliminated by his/her coach

Result details

Sing-offs and Live show results per week
Artist	The Sing-offs			Live shows	
Artist	Episode 11	Episode 12	Episode 13	Finals	
Artist	Episode 11	Episode 12	Episode 13	Round 1	Round 2
Mateusz Krzykała	—N/a	Safe	—N/a	Safe	Winner
Alicja Górzyńska	Safe	—N/a		Safe	Runner-up
Maja Cembrzyńska	—N/a		Safe	Safe	Runner-up
Tosia Zakrzewska	—N/a		Safe	Eliminated (Final)	—N/a
Ida Wargskog	—N/a		Safe	Eliminated (Final)	—N/a
Julia Bieniek	—N/a	Safe	—N/a	Eliminated (Final)	—N/a
Maximilian Kononow	—N/a	Safe	—N/a	Eliminated (Final)	—N/a
Laura Bąkiewicz	Safe	—N/a		Eliminated (Final)	—N/a
Piotr Pączkowski	Safe	—N/a		Eliminated (Final)	—N/a
Marcel Kotuła	—N/a		Eliminated (week 3)	—N/a	
Maja Janowska	—N/a		Eliminated (week 3)	—N/a	
Kornelia Markuszewska	—N/a		Eliminated (week 3)	—N/a	
Paulina Knapik	—N/a	Eliminated (week 2)	—N/a		
Karolina Mikołajczak	—N/a	Eliminated (week 2)	—N/a		
Nadia Machała	—N/a	Eliminated (week 2)	—N/a		
Antosia Kraszewska	Eliminated (week 1)	—N/a			
Witek Piasecki	Eliminated (week 1)	—N/a			
Magda Maciołek	Eliminated (week 1)	—N/a			

=== Teams ===
Color key
Artist's info

- Team Dawid
- Team Cleo
- Team Tomson & Baron

Results details

- Winner
- Runner-up
- Eliminated

Artist	Battles	Sing Offs	Finale Part 1	Finale Part 2
Alicja Górzyńska	Coach's choice	Coach's choice	Coach's choice	Runner-up
Laura Bąkiewicz	Coach's choice	Coach's choice	Eliminated	
Piotr Pączkowski	Coach's choice	Coach's choice	Eliminated	
Antosia Kraszewska	Coach's choice	Eliminated		
Witek Piasecki	Coach's choice	Eliminated		
Magda Maciołek	Coach's choice	Eliminated		
Mateusz Krzykała	Coach's choice	Coach's choice	Coach's choice	Winner
Julia Bieniek	Coach's choice	Coach's choice	Eliminated	
Maximilian Kononow	Coach's choice	Coach's choice	Eliminated	
Paulina Knapik	Coach's choice	Eliminated		
Karolina Mikołajczak	Coach's choice	Eliminated		
Nadia Machała	Coach's choice	Eliminated		
Maja Cembrzyńska	Coach's choice	Coach's choice	Coach's choice	Runner-up
Tosia Zakrzewska	Coach's choice	Coach's choice	Eliminated	
Ida Wargskog	Coach's choice	Coach's choice	Eliminated	
Marcel Kotuła	Coach's choice	Eliminated		
Maja Janowska	Coach's choice	Eliminated		
Kornelia Markuszewska	Coach's choice	Eliminated		
