= The Voice Kids (Polish TV series) series 4 =

The Voice Kids
- Series 4
- Hosted by: Tomasz Kammel; Ida Nowakowska-Herndon; Antoni Scardina; Oliwier Szot (V Reporters)
- Judges: Tomson & Baron; Dawid Kwiatkowski; Cleo
- Winner: Sara Egwu-James

Release
- Original network: TVP 2
- Original release: February 27 – April 17, 2021

Series chronology
- ← Previous; Series 3 Next → Series 5

The Voice Kids is a Polish reality music talent show for aspiring singers aged 7 to 14, airing on TVP 2. The fourth season premiered on February 27, 2021. Tomson & Baron, Dawid Kwiatkowski and Cleo returned as the coaches. Tomasz Kammel will return as host, with Ida Nowakowska-Herndon. Sara Egwu-James won the season, marking Tomson & Baron's first win.

== Coaches ==
Coaches gallery

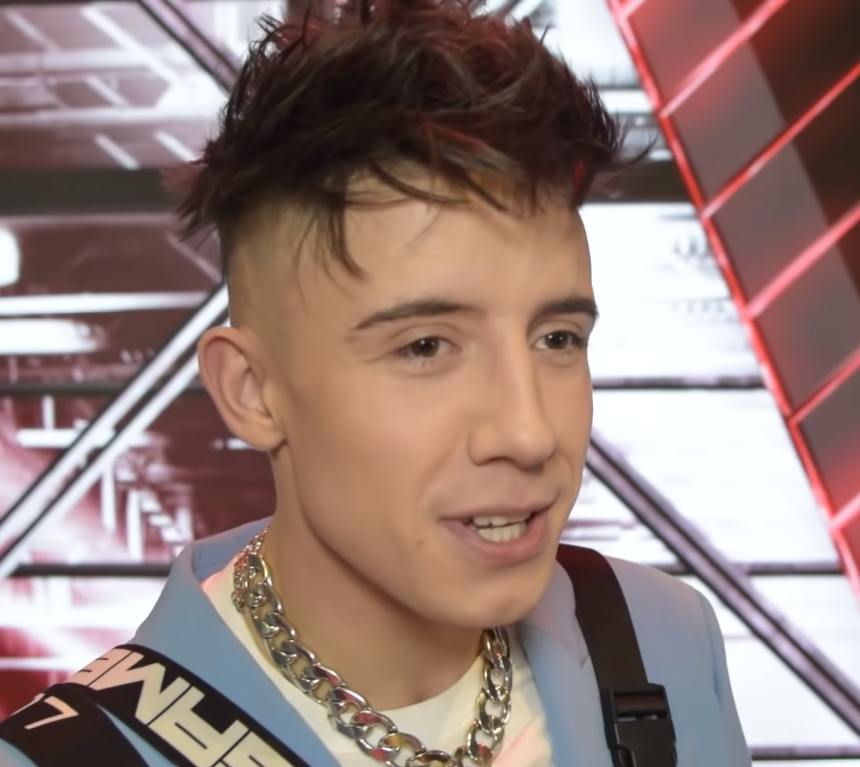
Dawid Kwiatkowski

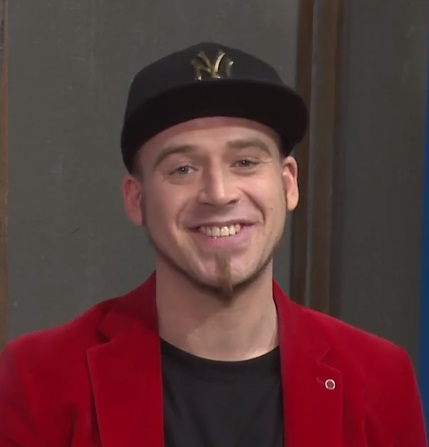
Tomasz Lach

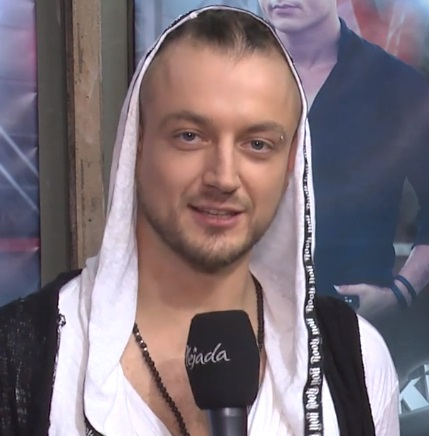
Aleksander Milwiw-Baron

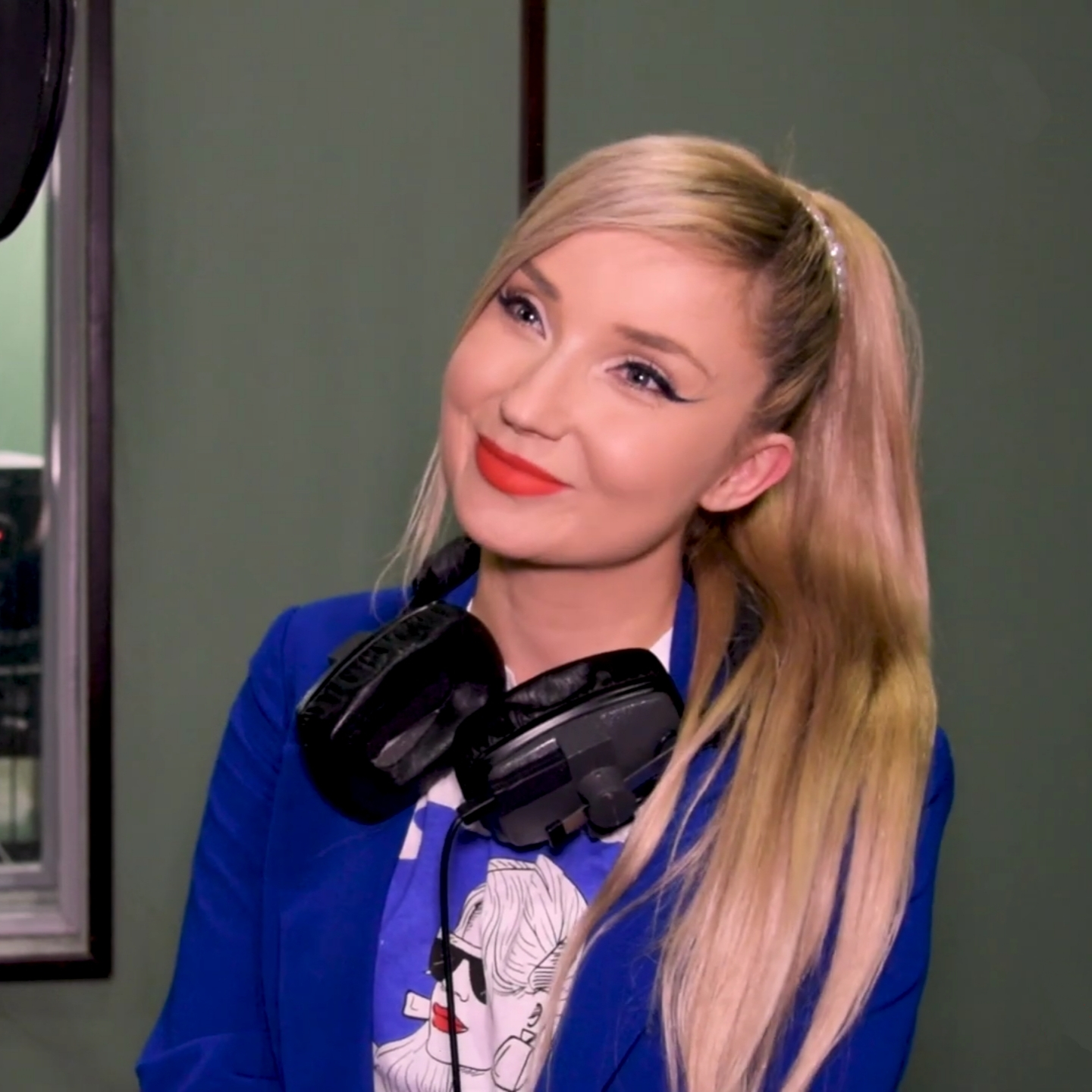
Cleo

== Teams ==
Colour key

- Winner
- Runner-up
- Winner of the online plebiscite
- Eliminated in the Final
- Eliminated in the Sing-offs
- Eliminated in the Battle rounds
- Withdrew

Coaches	Top 54 Artists					
Dawid Kwiatkowski						
Dawid Kwiatkowski	Aleksander Klembalski	Natalia Pawelska	Zofia Sławińska	Alicja Brąszewska	Szymon Nikiel	Adam Adamczuk
Dawid Kwiatkowski	Aleksandra Brzuszkiewicz	Gustaw Rosiński	Bartosz Przesmycki	Zuzanna Dudek	Amelia Zagrodzka	Nikola Wądołowska
Dawid Kwiatkowski	Hanna Włodarczyk	Gabriela Marszał	Maria Błaszczyk	Kamil Jachyra	Maja Czerwińska	Alicja Górzyńska
Tomson & Baron						
Tomson & Baron	Sara Egwu-James	Amelia Borkowska	Mikołaj Jabłoński	Julia Żełudkowska	Dobrusia Wielgosz	Wiktoria Wiater
Tomson & Baron	Julian Mantyk	Matylda Szklarska	Wiktoria Marko	Jagoda Rataj	Stanisław Szewieliński	Martyna Majda
Tomson & Baron	Magda Siedlok	Amelia Kita	Tomasz Nowak	Julia Błaszczyk	Katarzyna Żur	Bartosz Bąk
Cleo						
Cleo	Tatiana Kopala	Igor Konieczny	Karolina Szostak	Zuzanna Bera	Zuzanna Zięba	Maksymilian Belniak
Cleo	Sandra Michalak	Piotr Klima	Jakub Czernek	Szymon Tokarski	Wiktoria Kasprzyk	Zofia Ściegienna
Cleo	Wiktoria Kuczyńska	Oliwia Jarosz	Roksana Wojtkowska	Łucja Kamalla	Kornel Łakomy	Krystian Gontarz

== Blind auditions ==
Color key

Coach hit his/her "I WANT YOU" button
Coach did not press the "I WANT YOU" button
Artist defaulted to this coach's team
Artist elected to join this coach's team
Artist eliminated with no coach pressing his or her "I WANT YOU" button
Artist is an 'Allstar' contestant

=== Episode 1 (February 27, 2021) ===
Order	Artist	Age	Song	Coach's and contestant's choices		
Order	Artist	Age	Song	Dawid	Tomson & Baron	Cleo
1	Alicja Brąszewska	14	Just Give Me a Reason			
2	Gustaw Rosiński	14	Cry Just a Little Bit			
3	Natalia Kucharska	7	The Fox (What Does the Fox Say?)			
4	Sandra Michalak	13	Over The Rainbow			
5	Bartosz Przesmycki	14	Hold Back The River			
6	Amelia Borkowska	10	What The World Needs Now Is Love			

=== Episode 2 (February 27, 2021) ===
Order	Artist	Age	Song	Coach's and contestant's choices		
Order	Artist	Age	Song	Dawid	Tomson & Baron	Cleo
1	Piotr Klima	11	Dom (by Cleo)			
2	Jakub Czernek	14	Everything			
3	Laura Wierzbowicz	9	Moja Fantazja			
4	Zuzanna Dudek	14	Jesteś Bohaterem			
5	Paulina Ładosz	10	Pokaż na co Cię stać			
6	Szymon Tokarski	10	Nie daj się			
7	Sara Egwu-James	12	Anyone			

=== Episode 3 (March 5, 2021) ===
Order	Artist	Age	Song	Coach's and contestant's choices		
Order	Artist	Age	Song	Dawid	Tomson & Baron	Cleo
1	Karolina Szostak	14	Nie ma, nie ma Ciebie			
2	Szymon Nikiel	11	Zabiorę cię właśnie tam			
3	Martyna Majda	14	Sign of the Times			
4	Tymon Kowalczyk	8	Parostatek			
5	Adam Adamczuk	14	Lost in Japan			
6	Wiktoria Kasprzyk	12	Hold My Hand			

=== Episode 4 (March 5, 2021) ===
Order	Artist	Age	Song	Coach's and contestant's choices		
Order	Artist	Age	Song	Dawid	Tomson & Baron	Cleo
1	Zofia Ściegienna	9	Hakuna Matata			
2	Dobrusia Wielgosz	14	Rain on Me			
3	Oliwia Stefanowska	13	Tamta Dziewczyna			
4	Stanisław Szewieliński	13	Kings & Queens			
5	Julia Żełudkowska	13	Can't Take My Eyes Off You			
6	Aleksander Klembalski	14	Have I Told You Lately			
7	Aleksandra Brzuszkiewicz	14	Someone You Loved			

Aleksandra Brzuszkiewicz appeared earlier in the first season of The Voice Kids, as a member of Tomson and Baron team. She completed the program at the stage of battles. In this edition, she chose Dawid Kwiatkowski as her trainer.

=== Episode 5 (March 6, 2021) ===
Order	Artist	Age	Song	Coach's and contestant's choices		
Order	Artist	Age	Song	Dawid	Tomson & Baron	Cleo
1	Wiktoria Wiater	13	Orła cień			
2	Amelia Zagrodzka	8	Co powie Tata			
3	Zuzanna Zięba	13	Try			
4	Wojciech Malinowski	13	Między ciszą a ciszą			
5	Wiktoria Kuczyńska	13	Chcę tu zostać			
6	Julian Mantyk	13	An Angel			
7	Nikola Wądołowska	13	Nie kłami			

=== Episode 6 (March 6, 2021) ===
Order	Artist	Age	Song	Coach's and contestant's choices		
Order	Artist	Age	Song	Dawid	Tomson & Baron	Cleo
1	Oliwia Jarosz	14	Someone Like You			
2	Matylda Szklarska	14	Love Me Again			
3	Marcel Józefowicz	11	If I Can't Have You			
4	Zuzanna Bera	13	One Last Time			
5	Natalia Pawelska	9	Cudownych Rodziców Mam			
6	Wiktoria Marko	14	Hold My Hand			

=== Episode 7 (March 12, 2021) ===
Order	Artist	Age	Song	Coach's and contestant's choices		
Order	Artist	Age	Song	Dawid	Tomson & Baron	Cleo
1	Roksana Wojtkowska	11	Nie daj się			
2	Alicja Górzyńska	13	Run to You			
3	Igor Konieczny	14	Thinking of Loud			
4	Amelia Sowińska	9	Iść w stronę słońca			
5	Zofia Sławińska	14	Someone Like You			
6	Mikołaj Jabłoński	12	Grenade			

=== Episode 8 (March 12, 2021) ===
Order	Artist	Age	Song	Coach's and contestant's choices		
Order	Artist	Age	Song	Dawid	Tomson & Baron	Cleo
1	Łucja Kamalla	14	Alfabet świateł (by Cleo)			
2	Kornel Łakomy	10	Remedium			
3	Hanna Włodarczyk	11	The Best			
4	Jagoda Rataj	14	Have I Told You Lately			
5	Magdalena Siedlok	12	High Hopes			
6	Narinne Dąbrowska	14	Jar of Hearts			
7	Amelia Kita	14	Dancing on My Own			

=== Episode 9 (March 13, 2021) ===
Order	Artist	Age	Song	Coach's and contestant's choices		
Order	Artist	Age	Song	Dawid	Tomson & Baron	Cleo
1	Tatiana Kopala	10	Pokaż na co cię stać			
2	Tomasz Nowak	13	Love Me Again			
3	Gabriela Marszał	12	Loyal Brave True			
4	Aleksandra Gołąb	14	Don't Call Me Up			
5	Maria Błaszczyk	10	Cicho			
6	Julia Błaszczyk	14	Stuck with U			
7	Kamil Jachyra	13	Dancing on My Own			

=== Episode 10 (March 13, 2021) ===
Order	Artist	Age	Song	Coach's and contestant's choices		
Order	Artist	Age	Song	Dawid	Tomson & Baron	Cleo
1	Katarzyna Żur	13	Firework			
2	Maksymilian Belniak	13	Takie tango			
3	Maja Czerwińska	14	Lovely			
4	Bartosz Bąk	13	Całuj mnie			
5	Martyna Rasz	12	I Want You Back			
6	Krystian Gontarz	14	Yin Yang			

Krystian Gontarz appeared earlier in the first season of The Voice Kids as a member of Tomson and Baron team. He completed the program at the stage of battles.

== The Battle Rounds ==
Color key

Artist won the Battle and advances to the Sing offs
Artist lost the Battle and was eliminated

=== Episode 11: Team Cleo (March 20, 2021) ===
The Cleo's group performed "Alfabet świateł" at the start of the show.

Episode	Coach	Order	Winner(s)	Song	Losers	
Episode 11 (March 20, 2021)	Cleo	1	Tatiana Kopala	Małgośka	Piotr Klima	Zofia Ściegienna
Episode 11 (March 20, 2021)	Cleo	2	Zuzanna Zięba	Step by Step	Roksana Wojtkowska	Łucja Kamalla
Episode 11 (March 20, 2021)	Cleo	3	Zuzanna Bera	I'm With You	Wiktoria Kasprzyk	Wiktoria Kuczyńska
Episode 11 (March 20, 2021)	Cleo	4	Maksymilian Belniak	Bananowy song	Szymon Tokarski	Kornel Łakomy
Episode 11 (March 20, 2021)	Cleo	5	Igor Konieczny	Photograph	Krystian Gontarz	Sandra Michalak
Episode 11 (March 20, 2021)	Cleo	6	Karolina Szostak	Shallow	Jakub Czernek	Oliwia Jarosz

Sing offs

Episode	Coach	Order	Artist	Song	Result
Episode 11 (March 20, 2021)	Cleo	1	Tatiana Kopala	Pokaż na co cię stać	Advanced
Episode 11 (March 20, 2021)	Cleo	2	Zuzanna Zięba	Try	Eliminated
Episode 11 (March 20, 2021)	Cleo	3	Zuzanna Bera	One Last Time	Eliminated
Episode 11 (March 20, 2021)	Cleo	4	Maksymilian Belniak	Takie tango	Eliminated
Episode 11 (March 20, 2021)	Cleo	5	Igor Konieczny	Thinking Out Loud	Advanced
Episode 11 (March 20, 2021)	Cleo	6	Karolina Szostak	Nie ma, nie ma Ciebie	Advanced

=== Episode 12: Team Dawid (March 27, 2021) ===
The Dawid's group performed "Duchy tych, co mieszkali tu" at the start of the show.

Episode	Coach	Order	Winner(s)	Song	Losers	
Episode 12 (March 27, 2021)	Dawid Kwiatkowski	1	Szymon Nikiel	Miłość rośnie wokół nas	Hanna Włodarczyk	Gabriela Marszał
Episode 12 (March 27, 2021)	Dawid Kwiatkowski	2	Adam Adamczuk	Say you won't let go	Bartosz Przesmycki	Kamil Jachyra
Episode 12 (March 27, 2021)	Dawid Kwiatkowski	3	Natalia Pawelska	Ramię w ramię	Amelia Zagrodzka	Maria Błaszczyk
Episode 12 (March 27, 2021)	Dawid Kwiatkowski	4	Aleksander Klembalski	Nadzieja	Maja Czerwińska	Nikola Wądołowska
Episode 12 (March 27, 2021)	Dawid Kwiatkowski	5	Zofia Sławińska	Wszystkiego na raz	Zuzanna Dudek	Gustaw Rosiński
Episode 12 (March 27, 2021)	Dawid Kwiatkowski	6	Alicja Brąszewska, Aleksandra Brzuszkiewicz	Don't let go	N/A	

Alicja Górzyńska could not participate in the battles for personal reasons. Dawid Kwiatkowski decided to promote Alicja and Aleksandra to the Sing-Off stage with permission of producers. Alicja Górzyńska was invited to participate Season 5 The Voice Kids.

Sing offs

Episode	Coach	Order	Artist	Song	Result
Episode 12 (March 27, 2021)	Dawid Kwiatkowski	1	Szymon Nikiel	Zabiorę cię właśnie tam	Eliminated
Episode 12 (March 27, 2021)	Dawid Kwiatkowski	2	Adam Adamczuk	Lost in Japan	Eliminated
Episode 12 (March 27, 2021)	Dawid Kwiatkowski	3	Natalia Pawelska	Cudownych Rodziców Mam	Advanced
Episode 12 (March 27, 2021)	Dawid Kwiatkowski	4	Aleksander Klembalski	Have I Told You Lately	Advanced
Episode 12 (March 27, 2021)	Dawid Kwiatkowski	5	Zofia Sławińska	Someone Like You	Advanced
Episode 12 (March 27, 2021)	Dawid Kwiatkowski	6	Aleksandra Brzuszkiewicz	Someone You Loved	Eliminated
Episode 12 (March 27, 2021)	Dawid Kwiatkowski	7	Alicja Brąszewska	Just Give Me a Reason	Eliminated

=== Episode 13: Team Tomson & Baron (April 3, 2021) ===
The Tomson & Baron's group performed "Ghostbusters" at the start of the show.

Episode	Coach	Order	Winner(s)	Song	Losers	
Episode 13 (April 3, 2021)	Tomson & Baron	1	Dobrusia Wielgosz	Don't Start Now	Martyna Majda	Julia Błaszczyk
Episode 13 (April 3, 2021)	Tomson & Baron	2	Julia Żełudkowska	Aura	Stanisław Szewieliński	Jagoda Rataj
Episode 13 (April 3, 2021)	Tomson & Baron	3	Mikołaj Jabłoński	Blame It On the Boogie	Tomasz Nowak	Bartłomiej Bąk
Episode 13 (April 3, 2021)	Tomson & Baron	4	Amelia Borkowska	What a wonderful world	Julian Mantyk	Wiktoria Marko
Episode 13 (April 3, 2021)	Tomson & Baron	5	Wiktoria Wiater	10 przykazań	Magda Siedlok	Kasia Żur
Episode 13 (April 3, 2021)	Tomson & Baron	6	Sara Egwu-James	Hero	Amelia Kita	Matylda Szklarska

Sing offs

Episode	Coach	Order	Artist	Song	Result
Episode 13 (April 3, 2021)	Tomson & Baron	1	Dobrusia Wielgosz	Rain on Me	Eliminated
Episode 13 (April 3, 2021)	Tomson & Baron	2	Julia Żełudkowska	Can't Take My Eyes Off You	Eliminated
Episode 13 (April 3, 2021)	Tomson & Baron	3	Mikołaj Jabłoński	Grenade	Advanced
Episode 13 (April 3, 2021)	Tomson & Baron	4	Amelia Borkowska	What The World Needs Now Is Love	Advanced
Episode 13 (April 3, 2021)	Tomson & Baron	5	Wiktoria Wiater	Orła cień	Eliminated
Episode 13 (April 3, 2021)	Tomson & Baron	6	Sara Egwu-James	Anyone	Advanced

== Episode 14 Finale ==
Color key

Artist was chosen by his/her coach
Artist was eliminated by his/her coach

=== Round 1 (April 10, 2021) ===
Order	Coach	Artist	Song	Result
1	Cleo	Karolina Szostak	Wielka Woda	Eliminated
2	Cleo	Igor Konieczny	Peron	Eliminated
3	Cleo	Tatiana Kopala	We Are The Champions	Cleo's Choice
1	Dawid Kwiatkowski	Natalia Pawelska	Lustro	Eliminated
2	Dawid Kwiatkowski	Aleksander Klembalski	Writing's On The Wall	Dawid's Choice
3	Dawid Kwiatkowski	Zofia Sławińska	Dla ciebie Mamo	Eliminated
1	Tomson & Baron	Amelia Borkowska	Feeling Good	Eliminated
2	Tomson & Baron	Mikołaj Jabłoński	Love On Top	Eliminated
3	Tomson & Baron	Sara Egwu-James	My Hometown	Tomson & Baron's Choice

Each contestant performed a duet with their judge.

Order	Coach	Artist	Duet song
1	Cleo	Tatiana Kopala	I'm Outta Love
2	Dawid Kwiatkowski	Aleksander Klembalski	Bez ciebie
3	Tomson & Baron	Sara Egwu-James	Say Something

=== Round 2 (April 17, 2021) ===
Each contestant performed a cover and their original song.

Order	Coach	Artist	English cover	Polish cover	Result
1	Cleo	Tatiana Kopala	Piece of My Heart	Mister of America	Runner-up
2	Dawid Kwiatkowski	Aleksander Klembalski	Hallelujah	Nieznajomy	Runner-up
3	Tomson & Baron	Sara Egwu-James	Greatest Love Of All	Czas Nas Uczy Pogody	Winner

== Elimination chart ==
Colour key
Artist's info

- Artist from Team Tomson & Baron
- Artist from Team Dawid Kwiatkowski
- Artist from Team Cleo

- Winner
- Runner-up
- Artist was saved by his/her coach
- Artist was eliminated by his/her coach

Result details

Sing-offs and Live show results per week
Artist	The Sing-offs			Live shows	
Artist	Episode 11	Episode 12	Episode 13	Finals	
Artist	Episode 11	Episode 12	Episode 13	Round 1	Round 2
Sara Egwu James	—N/a		Safe	Safe	Winner
Aleksander Klembalski	—N/a	Safe	—N/a	Safe	Runner-up
Tatiana Kopala	Safe	—N/a		Safe	Runner-up
Amelia Borkowska	—N/a		Safe	Eliminated (Final)	—N/a
Mikołaj Jabłoński	—N/a		Safe	Eliminated (Final)	—N/a
Natalia Pawelska	—N/a	Safe	—N/a	Eliminated (Final)	—N/a
Zofia Sławińska	—N/a	Safe	—N/a	Eliminated (Final)	—N/a
Karolina Szostak	Safe	—N/a		Eliminated (Final)	—N/a
Igor Konieczny	Safe	—N/a		Eliminated (Final)	—N/a
Julia Żełudkowska	—N/a		Eliminated (week 3)	—N/a	
Wiktoria Wiater	—N/a		Eliminated (week 3)	—N/a	
Dobrusia Wielgosz	—N/a		Eliminated (week 3)	—N/a	
Szymon Nikiel	—N/a	Eliminated (week 2)	—N/a		
Adam Adamczuk	—N/a	Eliminated (week 2)	—N/a		
Aleksandra Brzuszkiewicz	—N/a	Eliminated (week 2)	—N/a		
Alicja Brąszewska	—N/a	Eliminated (week 2)	—N/a		
Zuzanna Zięba	Eliminated (week 1)	—N/a			
Zuzanna Bera	Eliminated (week 1)	—N/a			
Maksymilian Belniak	Eliminated (week 1)	—N/a			

=== Teams ===
Color key
Artist's info

- Team Dawid
- Team Cleo
- Team Tomson & Baron

Results details

- Winner
- Runner-up
- Eliminated

Artist	Battles	Sing Offs	Finale Part 1	Finale Part 2
Aleksander Klembalski	Coach's choice	Coach's choice	Coach's choice	Runner-up
Natalia Pawelska	Coach's choice	Coach's choice	Eliminated	
Zofia Sławińska	Coach's choice	Coach's choice	Eliminated	
Szymon Nikiel	Coach's choice	Eliminated		
Adam Adamczuk	Coach's choice	Eliminated		
Aleksandra Brzuszkiewicz	Coach's choice	Eliminated		
Alicja Brąszewska	Coach's choice	Eliminated		
Tatiana Kopala	Coach's choice	Coach's choice	Coach's choice	Runner-up
Igor Konieczny	Coach's choice	Coach's choice	Eliminated	
Karolina Szostak	Coach's choice	Coach's choice	Eliminated	
Zuzanna Zięba	Coach's choice	Eliminated		
Zuzanna Bera	Coach's choice	Eliminated		
Maksymilian Belniak	Coach's choice	Eliminated		
Sara Egwu James	Coach's choice	Coach's choice	Coach's choice	Winner
Amelia Borkowska	Coach's choice	Coach's choice	Eliminated	
Mikołaj Jabłoński	Coach's choice	Coach's choice	Eliminated	
Julia Żełudkowska	Coach's choice	Eliminated		
Dobrusia Wielgosz	Coach's choice	Eliminated		
Wiktoria Wiater	Coach's choice	Eliminated		
