= The Voice Kids (Polish TV series) =

Polish talent show

- Genre: Talent show
- Created by: John de Mol
- Directed by: Rinke Rooyens
- Presented by: Tomasz Kammel; Barbara Kurdej-Szatan; Ida Nowakowska; Paulina Chylewska; Michalina Sosna
- Judges: Tomson & Baron; Dawid Kwiatkowski; Edyta Górniak; Cleo; Natasza Urbańska; Tribbs; Blanka; Sara James
- Theme music composer: Martijn Schimmer
- Country of origin: Poland
- Original language: Polish
- No. of seasons: 9
- No. of episodes: 108

Production
- Production companies: Talpa (2018–2019); ITV Studios (2020–present); Rochstar

Original release
- Network: TVP 2
- Release: January 1, 2018 – present

Related
- The Voice of Poland; The Voice Senior; The Voice (franchise)

The Voice Kids is a Polish reality and talent show that premiered on January 1, 2018, on the TVP 2 television network. The Voice Kids is a part of the internationally syndicated show The Voice and based on the reality singing competition launched in the Netherlands as The Voice Kids. The show was created by Dutch television producer John de Mol.

== Format ==
There are four phases in the competition. Stage one is the blind auditions; stage two is the battle rounds, stage three is the sing off, and stage four is the final live performance. Contestants are aged eight to fifteen (from season 4 contestants are aged eight to fourteen).

The rules of the competition are similar to those of The Voice of Poland. During the blind auditions, each coach selects and mentors 18 contestants. In the battle stage, participants are divided into three groups and challenge participants from other teams. Each battle results in one winner, but coaches do not name a loser. Battle stage winners go to the sing-off stage where the coaches select nine finalists—three from each team. The nine finalists perform live and the winner is selected by the viewing audience using SMS voting. The winner receives a scholarship and the possibility to release a song with Warner Music Poland (formerly Universal Music Polska). The Voice Kids is produced by Rochstar.

== Selection process ==
For the first season, the blind auditions began August 19, 2017, and concluded on August 23, 2017. Children who auditioned were between eight and fifteen years of age.

== Coaches ==
The original coaches for this talent show were Tomson and Baron of Afromental, former coach of the adult version Edyta Górniak, and Dawid Kwiatkowski. Górniak did not return for the second season and was replaced by Cleo. All coaches from second season returned for the third, fourth, fifth and sixth seasons.

On July 26, 2023, it was announced that Natasza Urbańska would replace Kwiatkowski in the seventh season of the show. All coaches from the seventh season returned for the eighth season. On July 30, 2025, it was announced that Tribbs would replace Urbańska in the ninth season. On August 6, 2025, it was announced that Blanka would replace Tomson & Baron in the ninth season.

On August 17, 2026, it was announced that the winner of the fourth season, Sara James, would become a new coach for the tenth season, making her the youngest coach in the entire The Voice franchise. It was also announced that Tomson & Baron would return to the show and replace Blanka in the tenth season.

=== Timeline ===
Color key
Featured as a full-time coach.
Featured as a contestant.

Timeline of coaches
Coach	Seasons									
Coach	1	2	3	4	5	6	7	8	9	10
Tomson & Baron										
Dawid Kwiatkowski										
Edyta Górniak										
Cleo										
Natasza Urbańska										
Tribbs										
Blanka										
Sara James										

=== Gallery ===
Current coaches

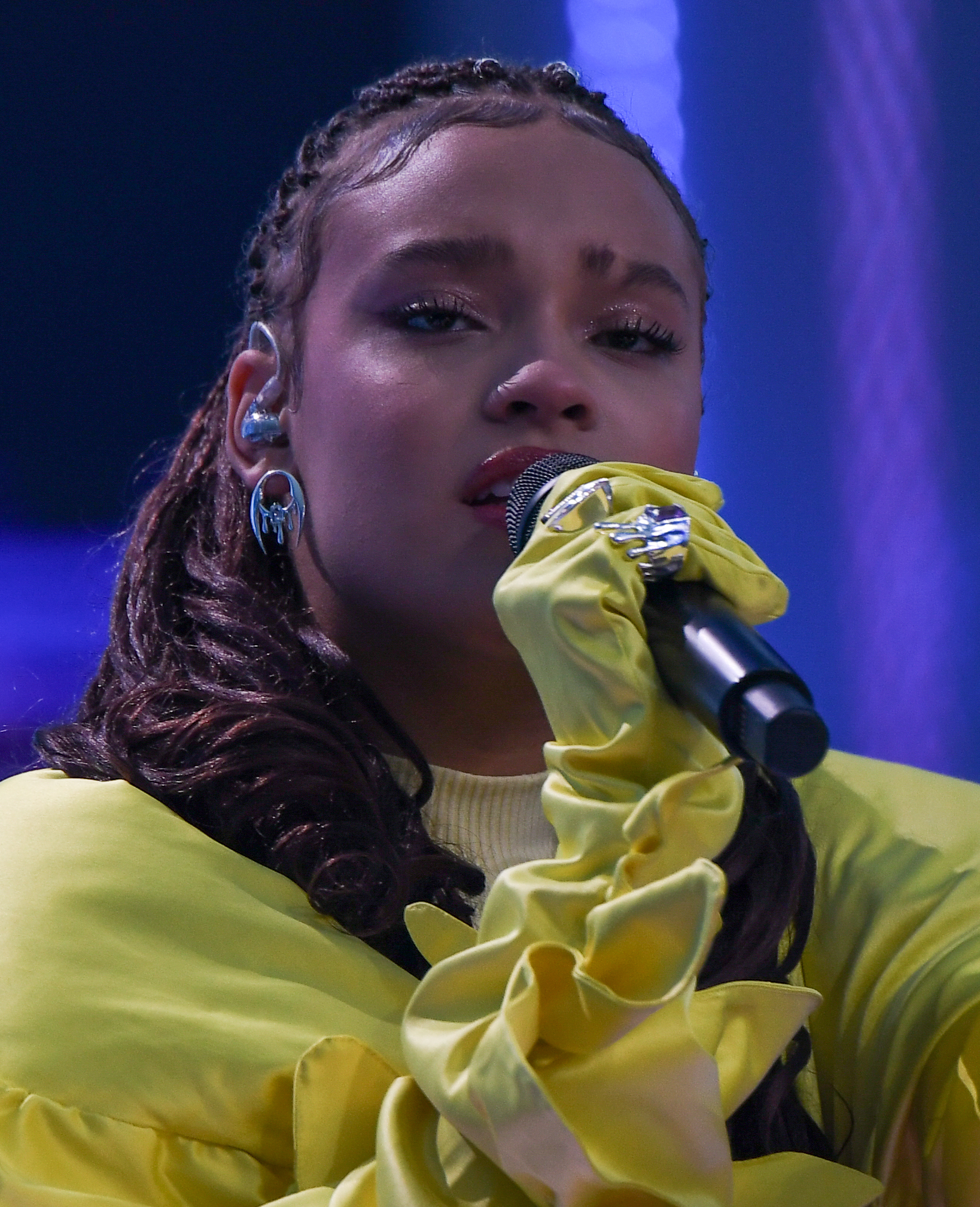
Sara James (10–)

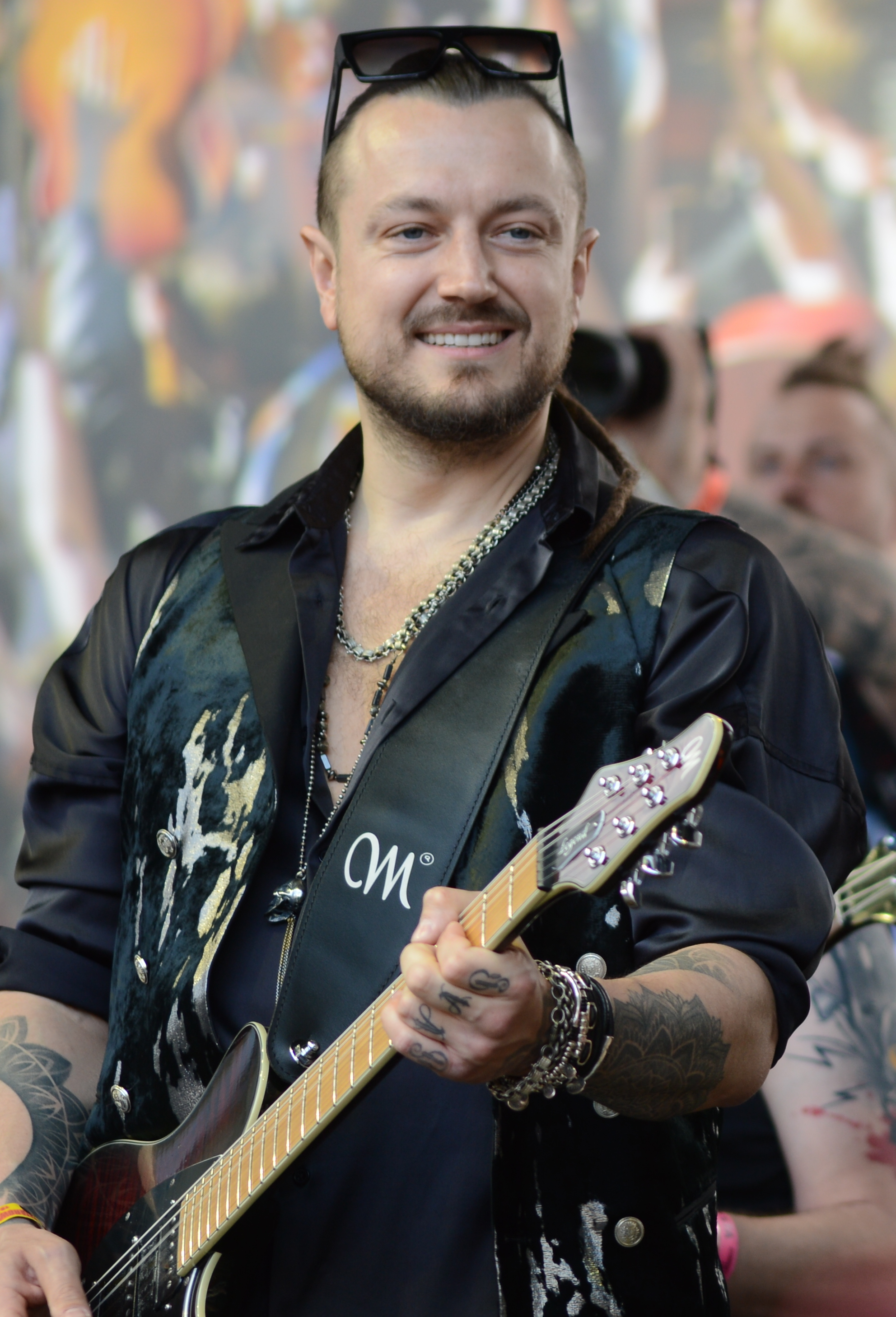
Baron (duo, 1–8, 10–)

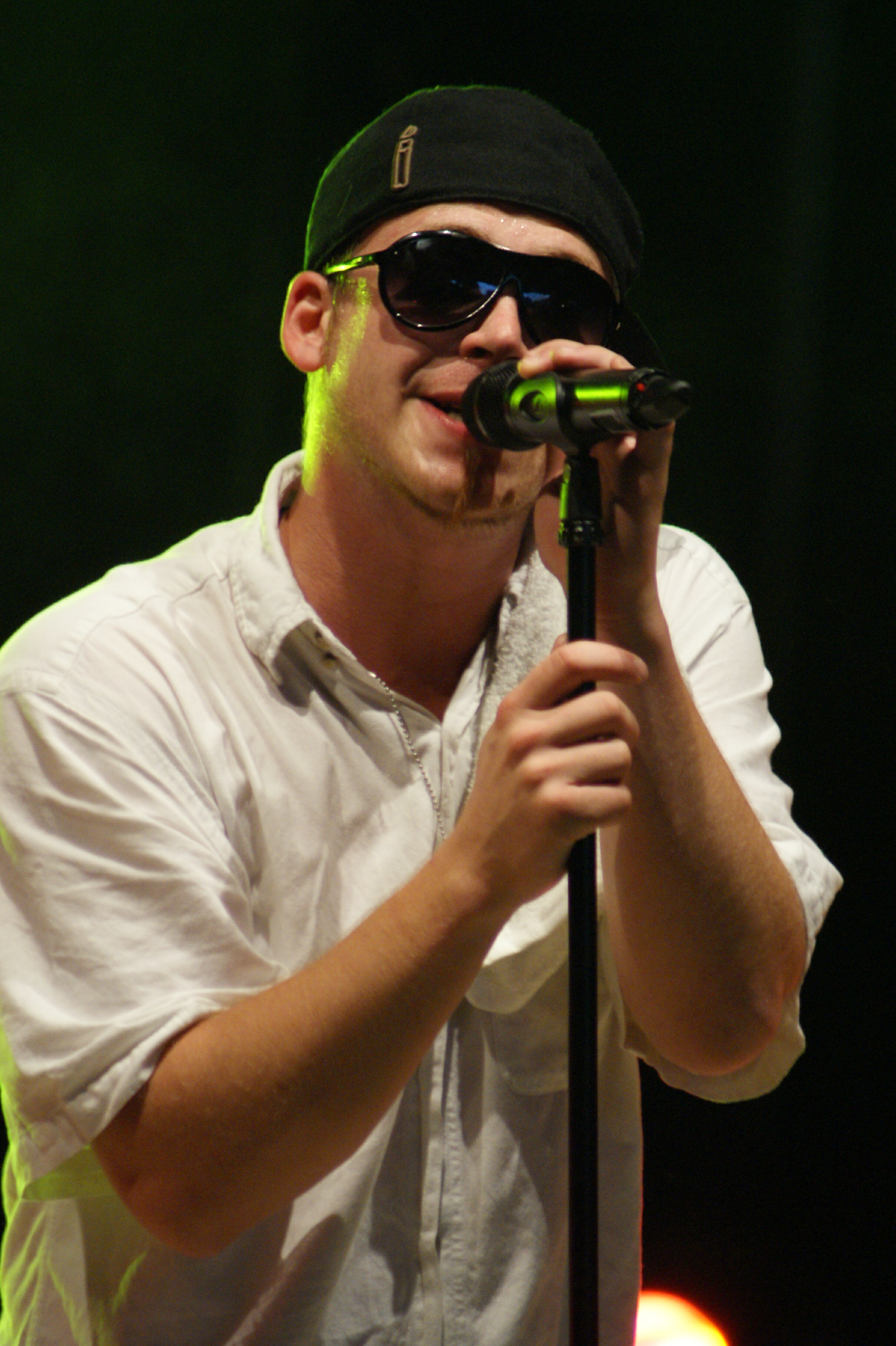
Tomson (duo, 1–8, 10–)

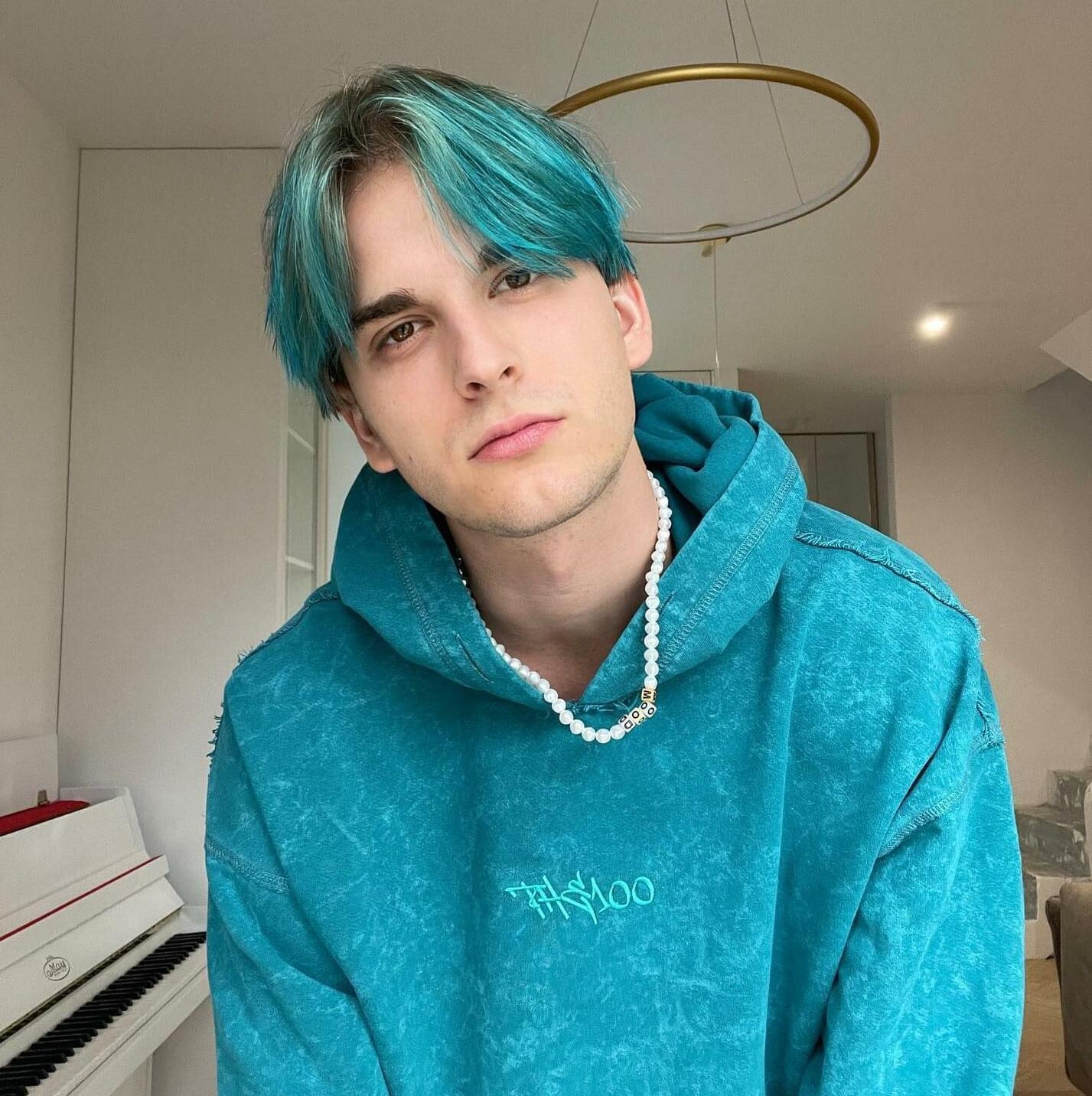
Tribbs (9–)

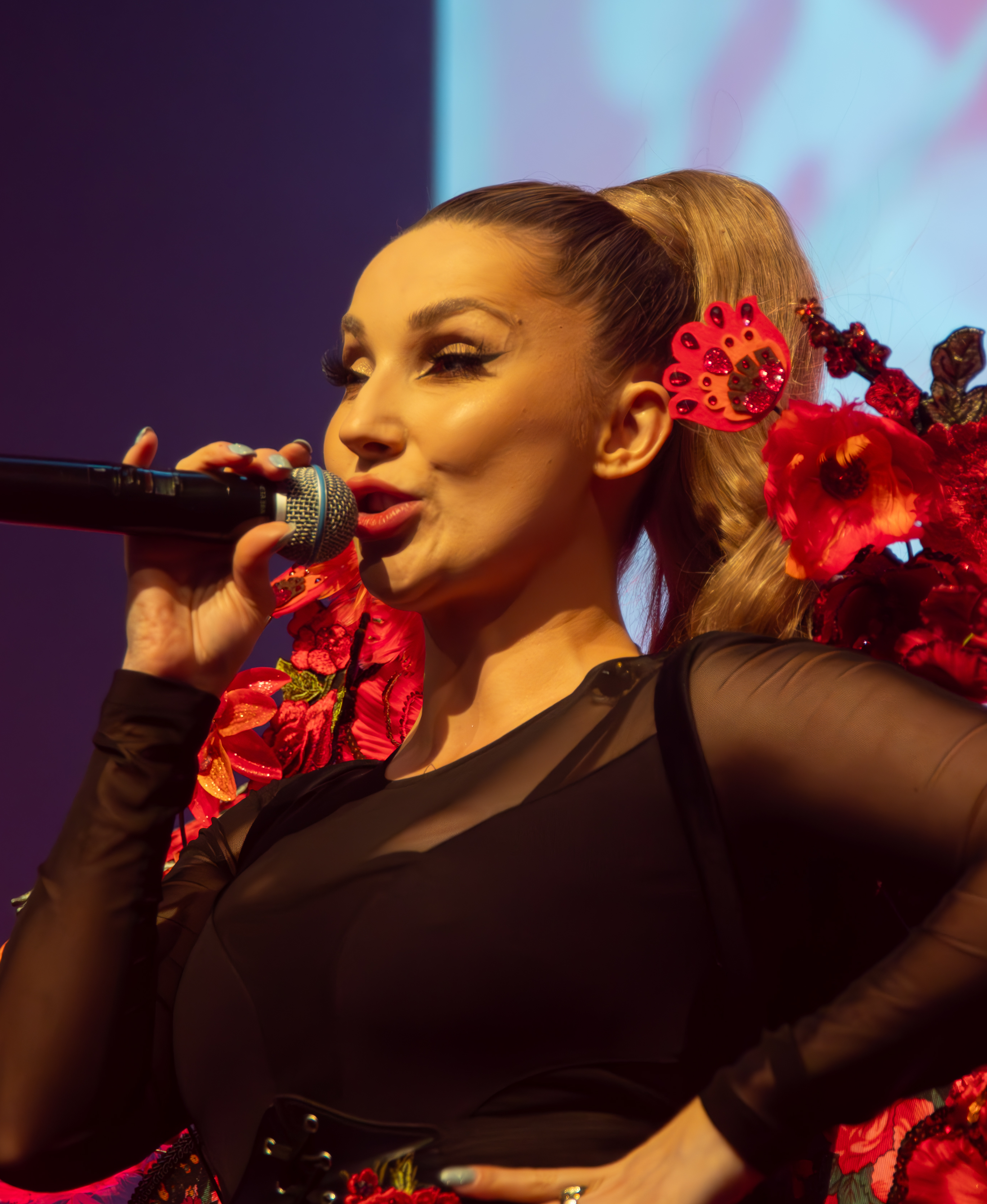
Cleo (2–)
Former coaches

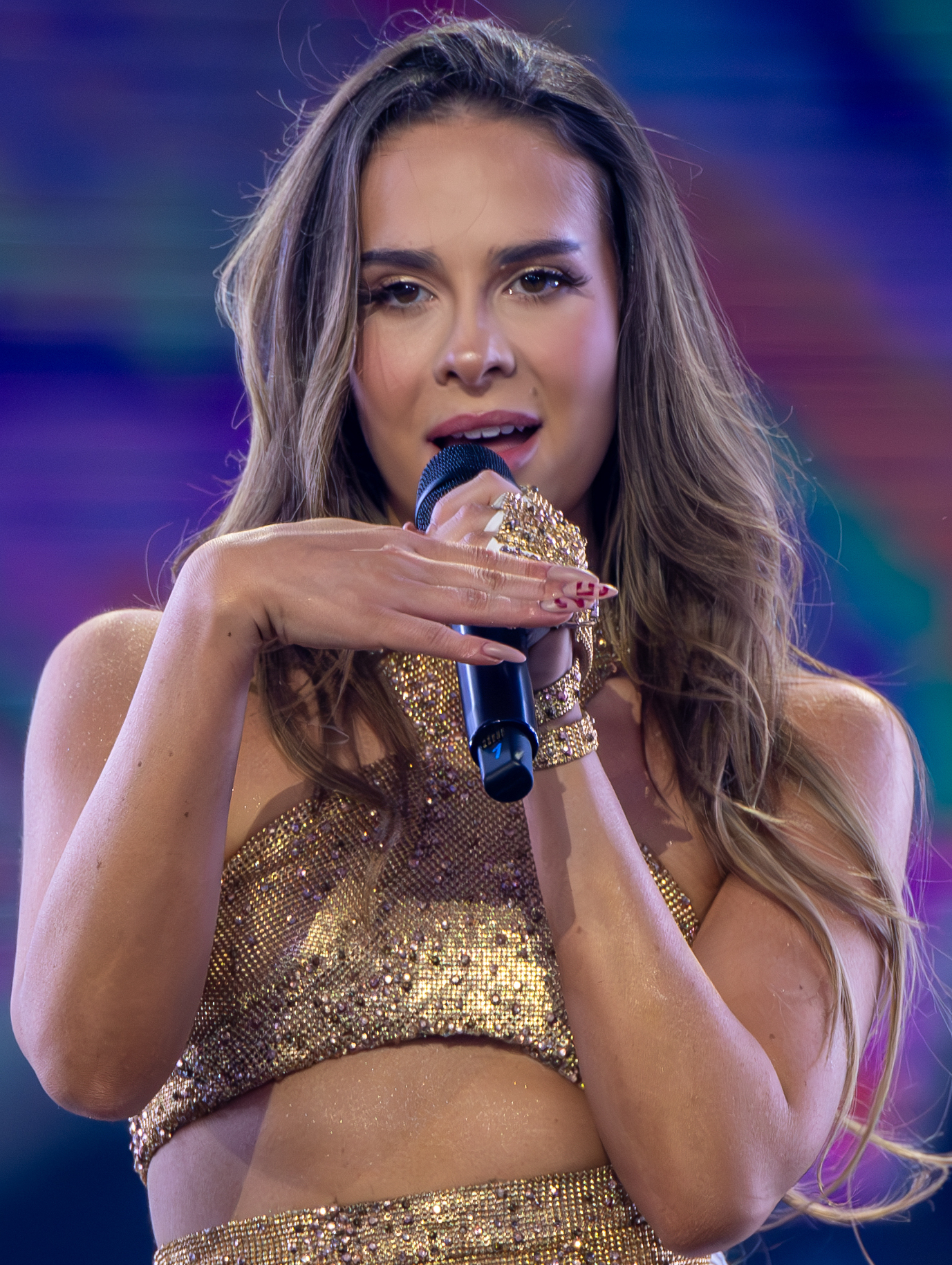
Blanka (9)

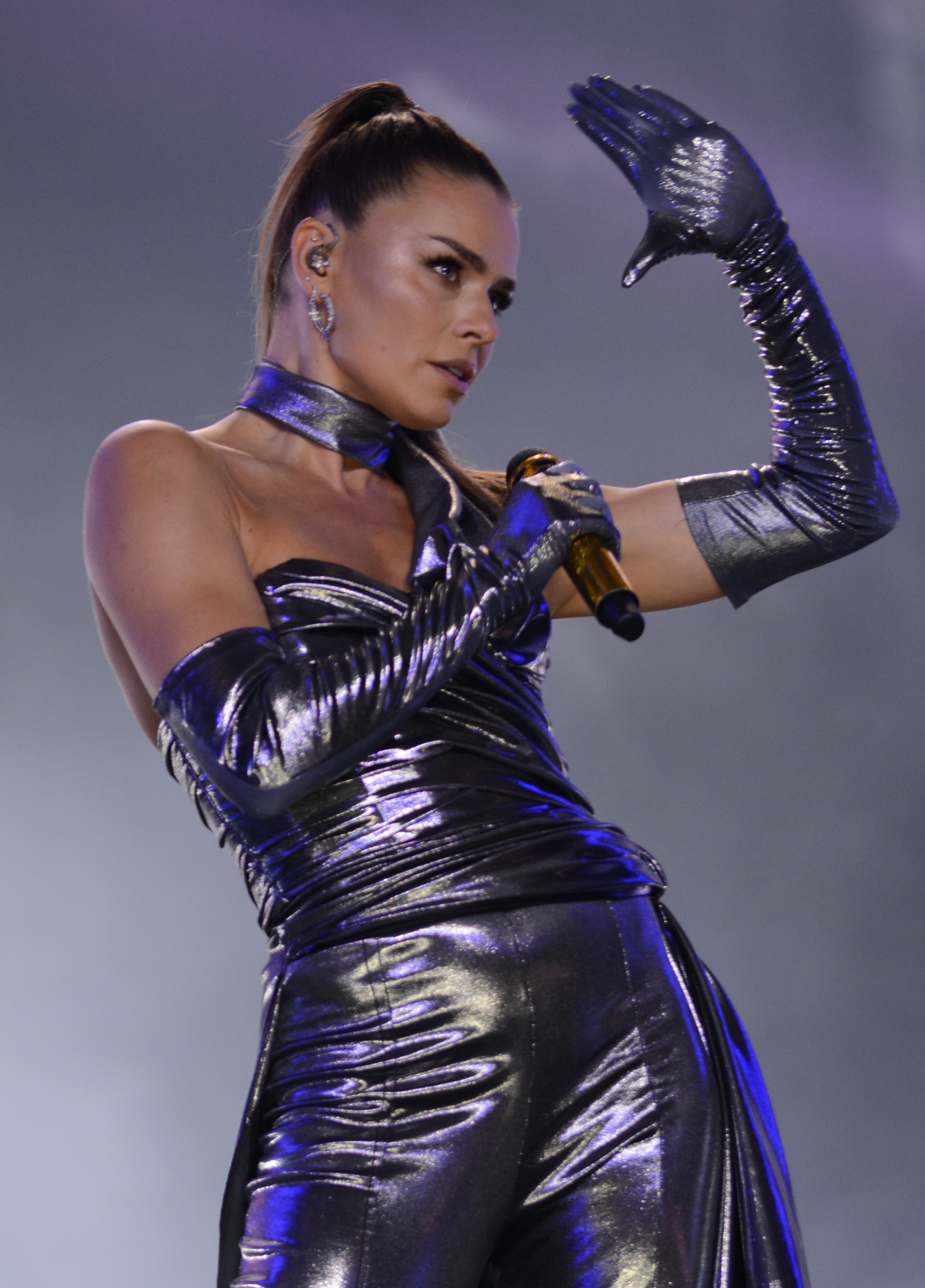
Natasza Urbańska (7–8)

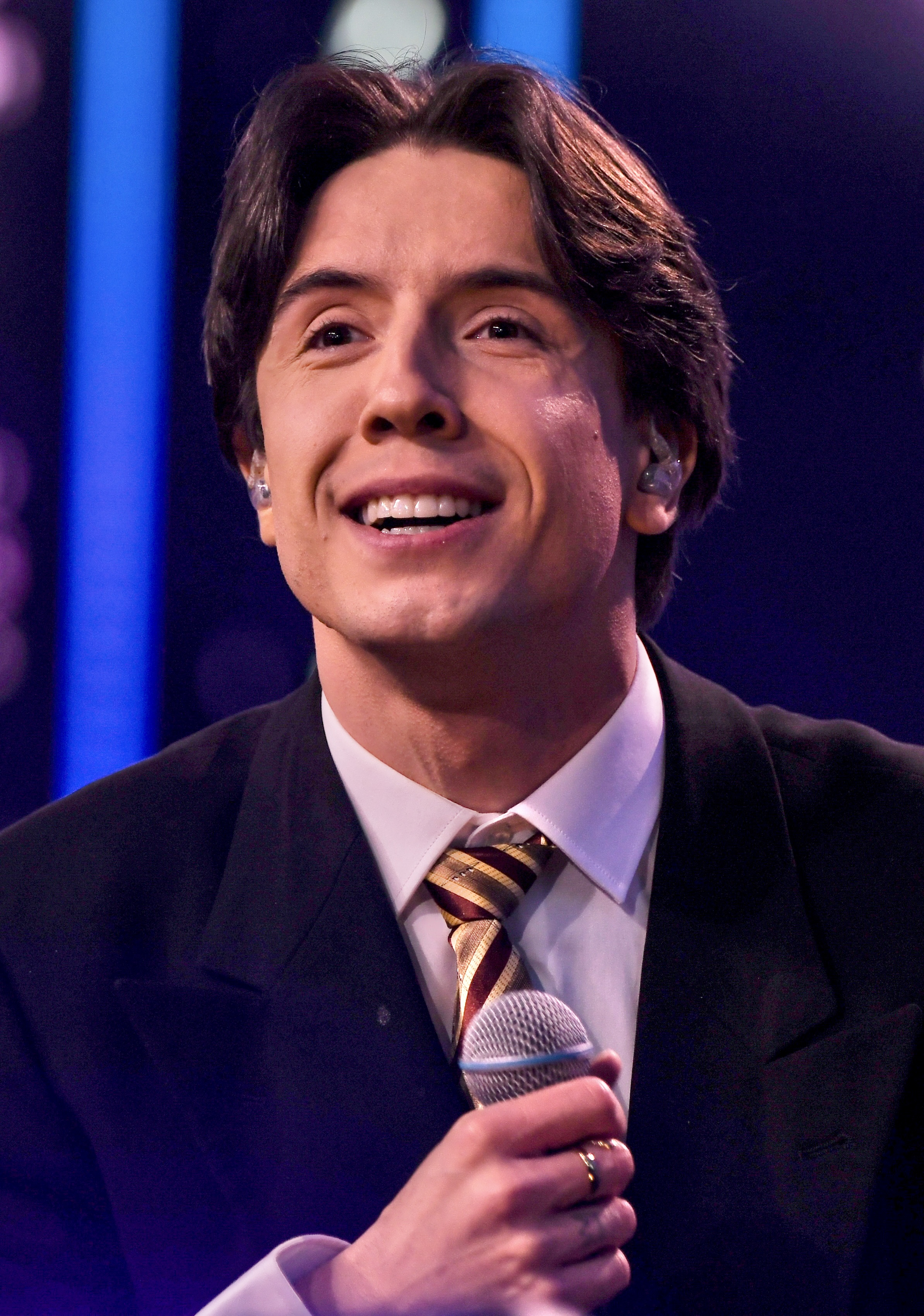
Dawid Kwiatkowski (1–6)

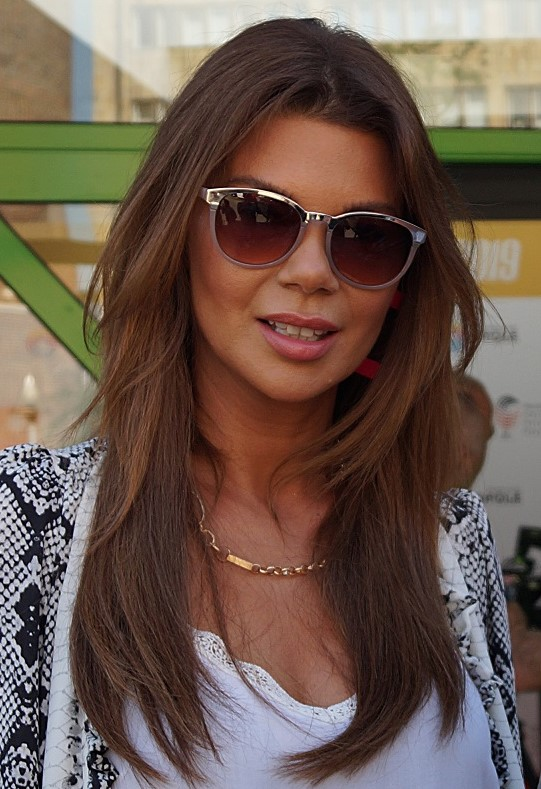
Edyta Górniak (1)

=== Line-up of coaches ===
Coaches' line-up by chairs order
Season	Year	Coaches			
Season	Year	1	2	3	4
1	2018	Dawid	Tomson & Baron	Edyta	—N/a
2	2019	Dawid	Tomson & Baron	Cleo	—N/a
3	2020	Dawid	Tomson & Baron	Cleo	—N/a
4	2021	Dawid	Tomson & Baron	Cleo	—N/a
5	2022	Dawid	Tomson & Baron	Cleo	—N/a
6	2023	Dawid	Tomson & Baron	Cleo	—N/a
7	2024	Cleo	Tomson & Baron	Natasza	—N/a
8	2025	Cleo	Tomson & Baron	Natasza	—N/a
9	2026	Blanka	Tribbs	Cleo	—N/a
10	2027	Sara	Tomson & Baron	Cleo	Tribbs

== Hosts ==
Color key
Featured as a main host.
Featured as a backstage host.
Featured as a contestant.

=== Timeline ===
Color key
Featured as a main host.
Featured as a backstage host.
Featured as a contestant.

Timeline of main hosts
Host	Seasons									
Host	1	2	3	4	5	6	7	8	9	10
Tomasz Kammel										
Barbara Kurdej-Szatan										
Adam Zdrójkowski										
Jan Dąbrowski										
Ida Nowakowska										
Antoni Scardina										
Oliwier Szot										
Paulina Chylewska										
Michalina Sosna										

== Coaches and finalists ==
Color key
Winner
Runner-up
Third place	Fourth place

Season	Coaches and their finalists			
1	Dawid Kwiatkowski	Tomson & Baron	Edyta Górniak	No fourth coach
1	Antek Scardina; Nela Zawadzka; Kuba Szmajkowski	Zuzia Jabłońska; Amelia Andryszczyk; Oliwia Kopiec	Roksana Węgiel; Mateusz Gędek; Natalia Zastępa	No fourth coach
2	Dawid Kwiatkowski	Tomson & Baron	Cleo	No fourth coach
2	Paweł Szymański; Oliwier Szot; Carla Fernandes	Wiktoria Gabor; Lena Marzec; Michał Szczurek	Anna Dąbrowska; Adrian Bałucki; Karolina Kruk	No fourth coach
3	Marcin Maciejczak; Ala Tracz; Anastazja Maciąg	Hania Sztachańska; Ewelina Kozub; Ola Gwazdacz	Natalia Kawalec; Wiktoria Zwolińska; Szymon Lubicki	No fourth coach
4	Aleksander Klembaski; Natalia Pawelska; Zofia Sławińska	Sara Egwu James; Mikołaj Jabłoński; Amelia Borkowska	Tatiana Kopala; Karolina Szostak; Igor Konieczny	No fourth coach
5	Alicja Górzyńska; Laura Bączkiewicz; Piotr Pączkowski	Maja Cembrzyńska; Tosia Zakrzewska; Ida Wargskog	Mateusz Krzykała; Julia Bieniek; Maximilian Kononow	No fourth coach
6	Martyna Gąsak; Leon Olek; Miłosz Siekierski	Marcel Tułacz; Anna Laskowska; Kinga Kipigroch	Marysia Stachera; Miłosz Zarzeka; Pola Płowiak	No fourth coach
7	Cleo	Tomson & Baron	Natasza Urbańska	No fourth coach
7	Ola Antoniak; Mateusz Pierożek; Marysia Stefanowska	Nikodem Pajączek; Milena Gajek; Wiktoria Szeflińska	Michell Siwak; Helena Zaciewska; Marta Porris Zalewska	No fourth coach
8	Julia Szczypior; Stanisław Karoń; Julia Witulska	Zosia Wójcik; Marcel Kózka; Laura Rumpel	Marianna Kłos; Fabian Pieniuta; Oskar Podolski	No fourth coach
9	Blanka	Tribbs	Cleo	No fourth coach
9	Antosia Grobelna; Ania Jankowska; Alan Lubiński	Wiktor Sas; Leon Pawlikowski; Amelka Łęczycka	Oliwia Johnson; Leon Skorupski; Ola Piłat	No fourth coach
10	Sara James	Tomson & Baron	Cleo	Tribbs

== Series overview ==
Warning: the following table presents a significant amount of different colors.

Teams color key
Team Dawid	Team Tomson & Baron	Team Natasza	Team Blanka
Team Edyta	Team Cleo	Team Tribbs

The Voice Kids Poland series overview
Season	Year	Winner	Second place	Third place	Fourth place	Winning coach	Hosts	
1	2018	Roksana Węgiel	Zuza Jabłońska	Antoni Scardina	—	Edyta Górniak	Tomasz Kammel	Barbara Kurdej-Szatan
2	2019	Anna Dąbrowska	Wiktoria Gabor	Paweł Szymański	—	Cleo	Tomasz Kammel	Barbara Kurdej-Szatan
3	2020	Marcin Maciejczak	Hania Sztachańska	Natalia Kawalec	—	Dawid Kwiatkowski	Tomasz Kammel	Ida Nowakowska
4	2021	Sara Egwu-James	Aleksander Klembalski	Tatiana Kopala	—	Tomson & Baron	Tomasz Kammel	Ida Nowakowska
5	2022	Mateusz Krzykała	Alicja Górzyńska	Maja Cembrzyńska	—	Cleo	Tomasz Kammel	Ida Nowakowska
6	2023	Martyna Gąsak	Marysia Stachera	Marcel Tułacz	—	Dawid Kwiatkowski	Tomasz Kammel	Ida Nowakowska
7	2024	Michell Siwak	Nikodem Pajączek	Ola Antoniak	—	Natasza Urbańska	Tomasz Kammel	Ida Nowakowska
8	2025	Zosia Wójcik	Marianna Kłos	Julia Szczypior	—	Tomson & Baron	Paulina Chylewska	Michalina Sosna
9	2026	Wiktor Sas	Antosia Grobelna	Oliwia Johnson	—	Tribbs	Paulina Chylewska	Michalina Sosna
10	2027	Upcoming season						

=== Season 1 (2018) ===
The first edition of The Voice Kids premiered on January 1, 2018. The judges were Edyta Górniak, Tomson and Baron, and Dawid Kwiatkowski. The show was hosted by Tomasz Kammel, Barbara Kurdej-Szatan and Adam Zdrójkowski. The winner was 13-year-old Roksana Węgiel from Team Edyta, who later won Junior Eurovision Song Contest 2018 for Poland with the song "Anyone I Want to Be".

=== Season 2 (2019) ===
The second edition of The Voice Kids premiered on January 1, 2019. The judges were Dawid Kwiatkowski, Tomson and Baron, and Cleo. The show was hosted by Tomasz Kammel, Barbara Kurdej-Szatan, and Jaś Dąbrowski. The winner was 14-year-old Anna Dąbrowska from Team Cleo.

=== Season 3 (2020) ===
The third edition of The Voice Kids premiered on January 1, 2020. All four coaches and main host from the previous season returned, whereas Ida Nowakowska joined the show as new host replacing Barbara Kurdej-Szatan. The winner was 14-year-old Marcin Maciejczak from Team Dawid.

=== Season 4 (2021) ===
The fourth edition of The Voice Kids premiered on February 27, 2021. All four coaches from the previous season returned in the new season. The show was hosted by Tomasz Kammel, Ida Nowakowska, Antoni Scardina and Oliwier Szot, replacing Jan Dąbrowski. Sara Egwu-James from Team Tomson & Baron won season 4 and later represented Poland in the Junior Eurovision Song Contest 2021 with the song "Somebody".

=== Season 5 (2022) ===
The fifth edition of The Voice Kids premiered on February 26, 2022. All four coaches from the previous season returned in the new season. The show was hosted by Tomasz Kammel, Ida Nowakowska, Antoni Scardina and Oliwier Szot, replacing Jan Dąbrowski. The winner was Mateusz Krzykała from Team Cleo.

=== Season 6 (2023) ===
The sixth edition of The Voice Kids premiered on February 25, 2023. All four coaches from the previous season returned in the new season. The show was hosted by Tomasz Kammel and Ida Nowakowska. On April 29, 2023, the winner was announced to be Martyna Gąsak from Team Dawid. This was the last season to feature Kwiatkowski as a coach.

=== Season 7 (2024) ===
The seventh edition of The Voice Kids premiered on February 24, 2024. Cleo and Tomson & Baron returned as coaches. On July 26, 2023, it was announced that Natasza Urbańska would replace Dawid Kwiatkowski in the seventh season of the show. The show was hosted by Tomasz Kammel and Ida Nowakowska. On April 27, 2024, the winner was announced to be Michell Siwak from Team Natasza.

=== Season 8 (2025) ===
The eighth edition of The Voice Kids premiered on February 22, 2025. All three coaches from the previous season returned for the eighth season. However, on August 19, 2024, it was announced that Paulina Chylewska and Michalina Sosna would replace Tomasz Kammel and Ida Nowakowska as the new main hosts. On May 3, 2025, the winner was announced to be Zofia Wójcik from Team Tomson & Baron. Marianna Kłos, the runner-up from Team Natasza, represented Poland in the Junior Eurovision Song Contest 2025.

=== Season 9 (2026) ===
The ninth edition of The Voice Kids premiered on February 28, 2026. In May 2025, TVP confirmed the ninth season of The Voice Kids as the intended selection method for the Polish entry in the Junior Eurovision Song Contest 2026; participants of the format had thus far represented Poland every year between 2018 and 2025. On July 30, 2025, it was announced that Tribbs would replace Natasza Urbańska in the ninth season. Days later, Blanka was announced to replace Tomson & Baron as a coach and Cleo would return as a coach for her eighth consecutive season. With Tomson & Baron's departure, the ninth season is the first not to feature any coaches from the inaugural season. On May 9, 2026, the winner was announced to be Wiktor Sas from Team Tribbs.

=== Season 10 (2027) ===
The tenth edition of The Voice Kids will premiere in early 2027. On August 17, 2026, it was announced that season four winner Sara James would replace Blanka in the tenth season. The same day, it was announced that Cleo and Tribbs would return from the previous season, alongside Tomson & Baron, who return after a one-season hiatus. The tenth season will be the first season of The Voice Kids to feature four coaches instead of three.
