= Carla Fernandes =

Polish pop singer (born 2003)

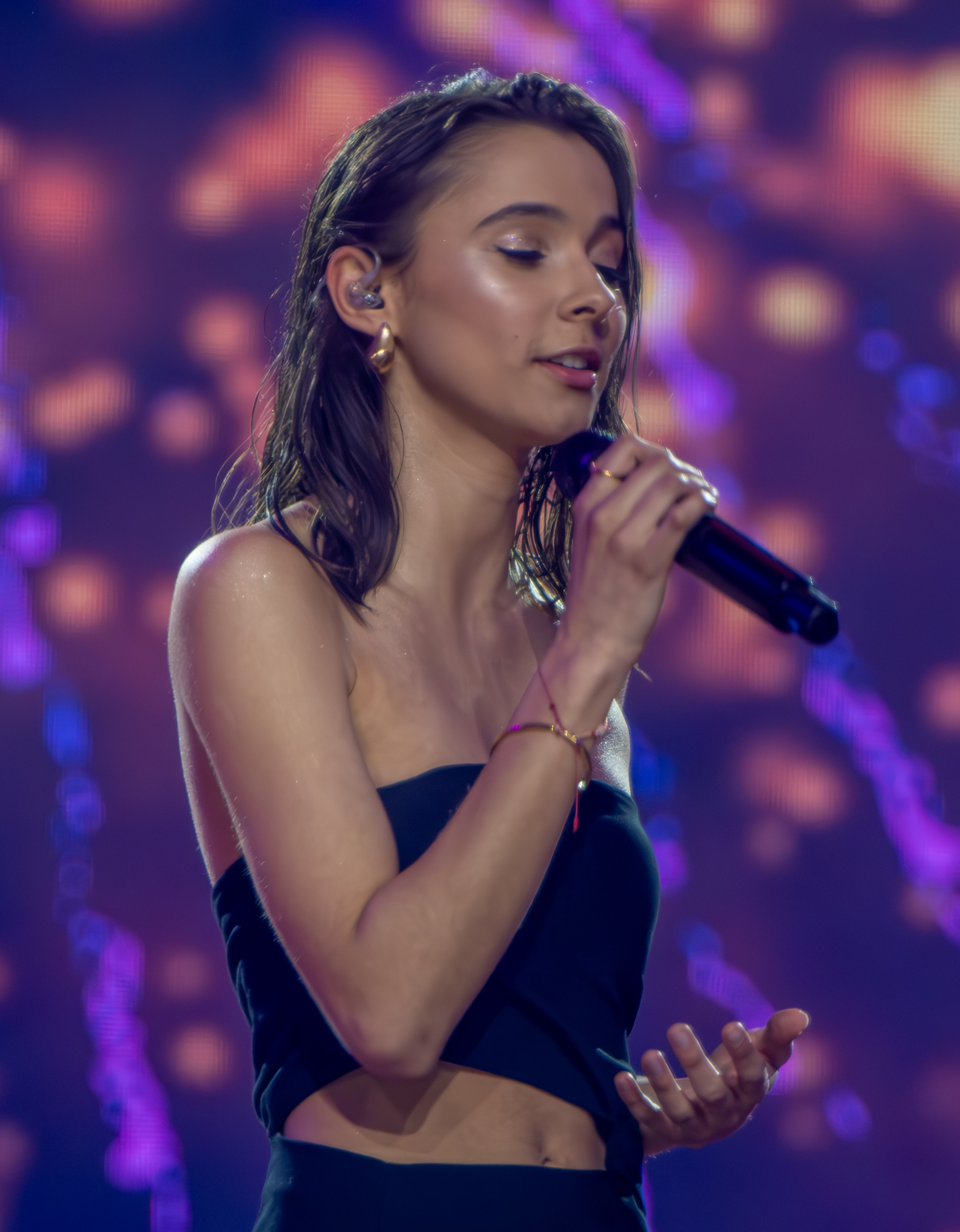
- Fernandes in 2024

Background information
- Born: 19 April 2003 (age 23); London, England, United Kingdom
- Genres: pop; R&B; latin pop
- Occupations: Singer, songwriter
- Years active: 2019–present
- Label: Universal Music Polska

Carla Fernandes (Note: Polish: [ˈkar.la fɛrˈnan.dɛs]; European Portuguese: [ˈkaɾ.lɐ fɨɾˈnɐ̃.dɨʃ]; Spanish: [ˈkaɾla feɾˈnandes]) (born 19 April 2003) is a Polish singer, songwriter and composer. She is known for songs such as "Do gwiazd" (2024), "Chcę tu zostać" (2024), "Więcej" (2024), and "Co, jeśli?" (2025). Her music incorporates elements of pop, R&B, and Latin pop.

== Early life and education ==
Carla Fernandes was born on 19 April 2003 in London, England. Her mother is Polish, and her father, who was also born in London, is Spanish and Portuguese. She grew up in Poland and speaks English, Polish, and Spanish.

In 2021, she began studying dentistry at the Medical University of Warsaw. After the first year, she took a leave of absence to pursue her music career.

== Career ==
In 2019, she participated in the TVP2 talent show The Voice Kids, where she reached the final. Her debut single "Jungle" premiered in March 2020. Also in 2020, she released singles in collaboration with other artists, including "Por qué" with Maikel Delacalle, and "Entera" with Matt Hunter. In 2021, she released an extended play entitled 18. In 2022, she released the single "Mi amor" together with J. J. Abel, which was featured in the soundtrack of the film 365 Days: This Day.

In 2024, she released the single "Do gwiazd", recorded together with Oskar Cyms for the soundtrack of the feature film Kleks Academy. The song received a platinum certification by the Polish Society of the Phonographic Industry, having sold over 50,000 copies, and also reached the third place of its official airplay chart (Oficjalna Lista Airplay). In 2025, they received the On Air Music Award in the categories fro the best band or duet and for the best pop song. Later that year, Fernandes also received the Amber Nightingale Award at the Sopot Festival. Her other songs listed on said record chart include "Chcę tu zostać" (2024), "Więcej" (2024), and "Co, jeśli?" (2025).

Fernandes is a member of the producer and songwriter collective Hotel Torino, based in Sosnowiec, Poland.

== Personal life ==
Fernandes resides in Poznań, Poland. In August 2025, she announced her engagement to musician and fellow Hotel Torino member Dominic Buczkowski-Wojtaszek.

== Accolades ==
Awards and nominations received by Tom Holland
Award	Year	Category	Nominated work	Result	Ref.
Top of the Top Sopot Festival	2025	Amber Nightingale Award	"Co, jeśli?"	Won	
On Air Music Awards	2025	Best band or duet	"Do gwiazd" (with Oskar Cyms)	Won	
On Air Music Awards	2025	Best pop song	"Do gwiazd" (with Oskar Cyms)	Won	
