= Dawid Kwiatkowski =

Polish singer-songwriter (born 1996)

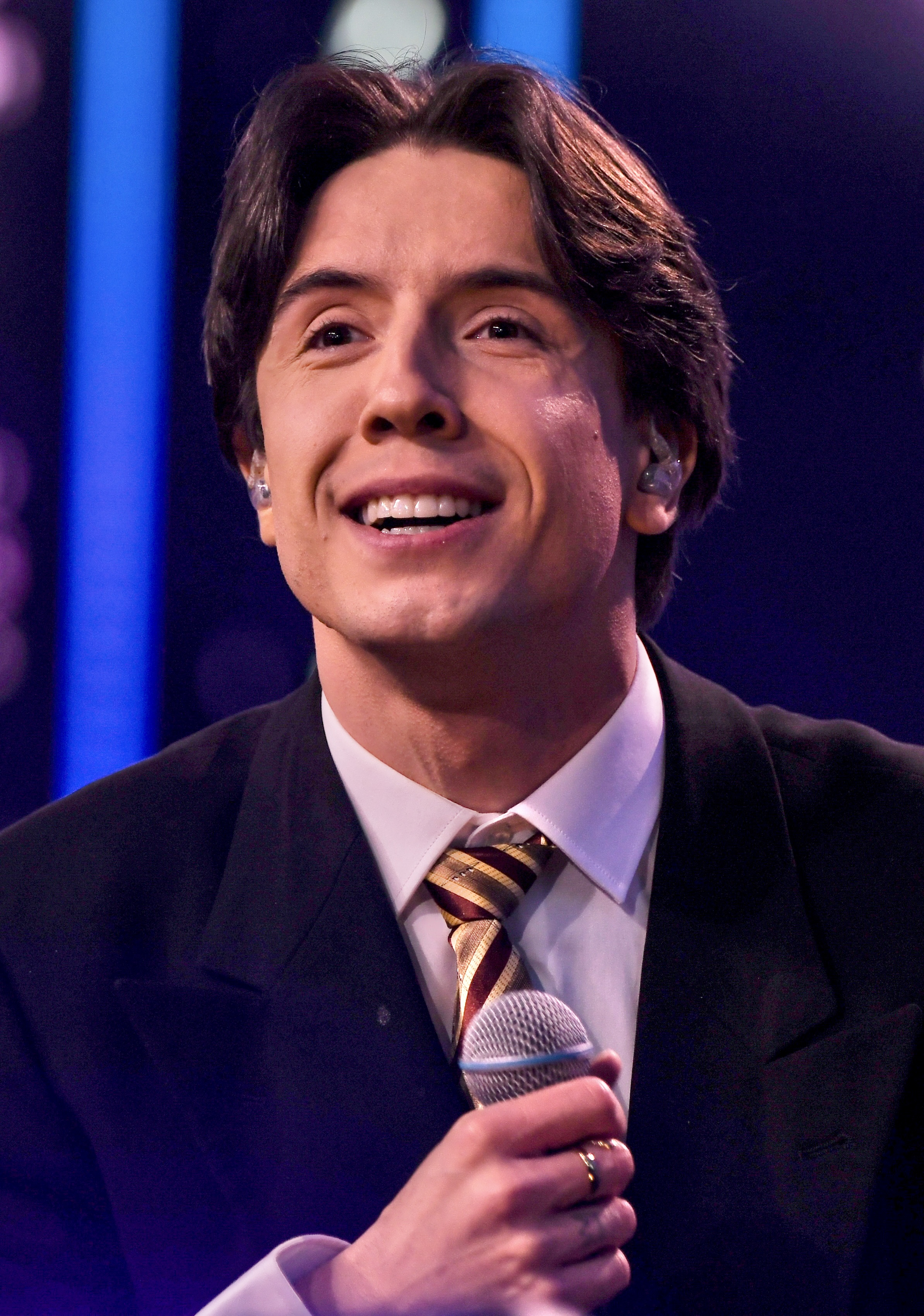
- Kwiatkowski in 2023

Background information
- Born: Dawid Kwiatkowski; 1 January 1996 (age 30); Gorzów Wielkopolski, Poland
- Genre: Pop
- Occupations: Singer, songwriter
- Instrument: Vocals
- Years active: 2012–present
- Label: My Music
- Website: dawidkwiatkowski.pl

Dawid Piotr Kwiatkowski (born 1 January 1996) is a Polish singer-songwriter and television personality.

He began his musical career in the band Two of Us. He has released seven solo studio albums: 9893 (2013), Akustycznie (2014), Pop & Roll (2014), Element trzeci (2015), Countdown (2016), 13 grzechów niczyich (2019) and Dawid Kwiatkowski (2021). The two albums he released reached the top of the list of the most sold albums in Poland, in addition, he received one platinum record and two gold records for his album sales.

He has won the MTV European Music Award for best European performer and twice for best Polish performer, plus four Nickelodeon Kids' Choice Awards, a Bursztynowy Słowik Award and a Telekamery Award.

He has been a participant, juror or guest on several entertainment programs and lent his voice to supporting characters in the animated films The SpongeBob Movie: Sponge Out of Water and Sing. He is actively involved in charity work.

== Family and education ==
He was born on 1 January 1996 at around 8:40 am in Gorzów Wielkopolski. He has two brothers, Mateusz and Michał, who is also a singer. His parents struggled with an alcohol problem. He was raised Catholic, but converted to Protestantism at the age of 15.

He studied at High School No. IV in Gorzow Wielkopolski, but dropped out in the second grade. He made a second attempt to get a high school education through the Internet, but did not take the exams due to an ongoing tour.

== Career ==
=== 2013–2014: 9893 & Pop & Roll ===
His debut single titled "Biegnijmy" (English: 'Let's Run') was released on 19 July 2013 under HQT Music Group label and produced by Adi Owsianik Group. On 29 October 2013 he received two awards in categories Fashionable debut on eska.pl and Discovery of the year at the Glam Awards 2013 that took place in Primate's Palace in Warsaw. His debut album titled 9893 was released on 19 November 2013., produced by Paweł Gawlik. The album was released by My Music and debuted at number 1 in the Polish album sales chart (OLiS). On 28 May 2014 Kwiatkowski released his acoustic album titled 9893 Akustycznie, including tracks from 9893 in new acoustic arrangements.

His second studio album titled Pop & Roll is set to be released on 19 November 2014. In Spring 2014, Kwiatkowski took part in television series Dancing with the Stars: Taniec z gwiazdami broadcast on Polsat. His dance partner was Janja Lesar. They came third, being eliminated in the semi-final.

=== 2015–2016: Element trzeci & Countdown ===
In November 2015, he released "Droga" as the lead single from his third studio album. Element trzeci was released on 2 December 2015. The album peaked at number four on the Polish Albums Chart. "Say Yes" was released as the lead single from his fourth studio album in November 2016. Countdown was released on 16 December 2016. The album peaked at number four on the Polish Albums Chart.

=== 2018–2021: 13 grzechów niczyich & self-titled album ===
"Jesteś" was released as the lead single from his fifth studio album on 10 January 2018. "Sam 1.0" was released as the second single from his fifth studio album on 10 July 2018. "Kochaj mnie" was released as the third single from his fifth studio album on 8 March 2019. "Mordo" was released as the fourth single from his fifth studio album on 24 May 2019. 13 grzechów niczyich was released on 31 May 2019. The album peaked at number two on the Polish Albums Chart.

On 29 October 2021, he released a self-titled album Dawid Kwiatkowski.

== Music inspirations ==
He appreciates the work of Rihanna. He is a fan of Ellie Goulding.

== Discography ==
=== Studio albums ===
| Title | Details | Peak chart positions | Certifications |
| Title | Details | POL | Certifications |
|---|---|---|---|
| 9893 | Released: 19 November 2013; Label: My Music, Sony Music Poland; Format: Digital download, CD | 1 | POL: Gold |
| 9893 Akustycznie | Released: 28 May 2014; Label: My Music; Format: Digital download, CD | 2 | |
| Pop & Roll | Released: 19 November 2014; Label: My Music; Format: Digital download, CD | 1 | POL: Gold |
| Element trzeci | Released: 2 December 2015; Label: My Music; Format: Digital download, CD | 4 | |
| Countdown | Released: 16 December 2016; Label: My Music; Format: Digital download, CD | 4 | |
| 13 grzechów niczyich | Released: 31 May 2019; Label: Warner Music Poland; Format: Digital download, CD | 2 | |
| Dawid Kwiatkowski | Released: 29 October 2021; Label: Warner Music Poland; Format: Digital download, CD | 2 | POL: Gold |

=== Singles ===
| Title | Year | Peak chart positions | | Album |
| Title | Year | POL (Airplay) | POL (Airplay Nowości) | Album |
|---|---|---|---|---|
| "Biegnijmy" | 2013 | — | — | 9893 |
| "Jak zapomnieć" | 2013 | — | — | Non-album single |
| "Na zawsze" | 2013 | — | — | 9893 |
| "Tathagata" | 2013 | — | — | 9893 |
| "Mój świat" (Acoustic Version) (feat. Patryk Kumór) | 2014 | — | — | 9893 Akustycznie |
| "Nie zmienisz mnie" | 2014 | — | — | Young Stars |
| "Tylko raz" | 2014 | — | — | Non-album single |
| "Jak to?" | 2014 | — | — | Pop & Roll |
| "21 Allstars – Kocham te święta" | 2014 | — | — | Non-album singles |
| "Szkoła" | 2015 | — | — | Non-album singles |
| "Droga" | 2015 | — | — | Element trzeci |
| "Say Yes" | 2016 | — | — | Countdown |
| "Let It Breathe" | 2017 | — | — | Countdown |
| "Countdown" | 2017 | — | — | Countdown |
| "Jesteś" | 2018 | 34 | 5 | 13 grzechów niczyich |
| "Sam 1.0" | 2018 | — | — | 13 grzechów niczyich |
| "Kochaj mnie" | 2019 | — | — | 13 grzechów niczyich |
| "Mordo" | 2019 | — | — | 13 grzechów niczyich |
| "Świąteczna" | 2019 | — | — | Non-album single |
| "Bratnie Dusze" (with Cleo) | 2020 | — | — | vinyLOVA |
"—" denotes a single that did not chart or was not released.

== Music videos ==
| Title | Year |
|---|---|
| "Jak zapomnieć" | 2013 |
| "Biegnijmy" | 2013 |
| "Na zawsze" | 2013 |
| "Tathagata" | 2013 |
| "Mój świat" | 2014 |
| "Tylko raz" | 2014 |
| "Nie zmienisz mnie" | 2014 |
| "Jak to?" | 2014 |
| "Szepczę" | 2015 |
| "Droga" | 2015 |

== Awards and nominations ==
| Year | Ceremony | Category | Result |
|---|---|---|---|
| 2013 | Glam Awards | Fashionable debut on eska.pl | Won |
| 2013 | Glam Awards | Discovery of the year | Won |
| 2014 | Kid's Choice Awards | Favourite Polish Artist | Won |
| 2014 | Plejada Top Ten | Debut of the year | Nominated |
| 2014 | Plejada Top Ten | Plejada Readers' Award | Won |
| 2014 | MTV Europe Music Awards | Best Polish Act | Won |
| 2014 | MTV Europe Music Awards | Best Eastern European Act | Won |
| 2014 | MTV Europe Music Awards | Best Worldwide Act | Nominated |
| 2015 | Kid's Choice Awards | Best Polish Act | Won |
| 2017 | MTV Europe Music Awards | Best Polish Act | Won |
| 2017 | Kid's Choice Awards | Best Polish Act | Won |
