= Lato Zet i Dwójki 2014 =

Series of open-air concerts in Poland

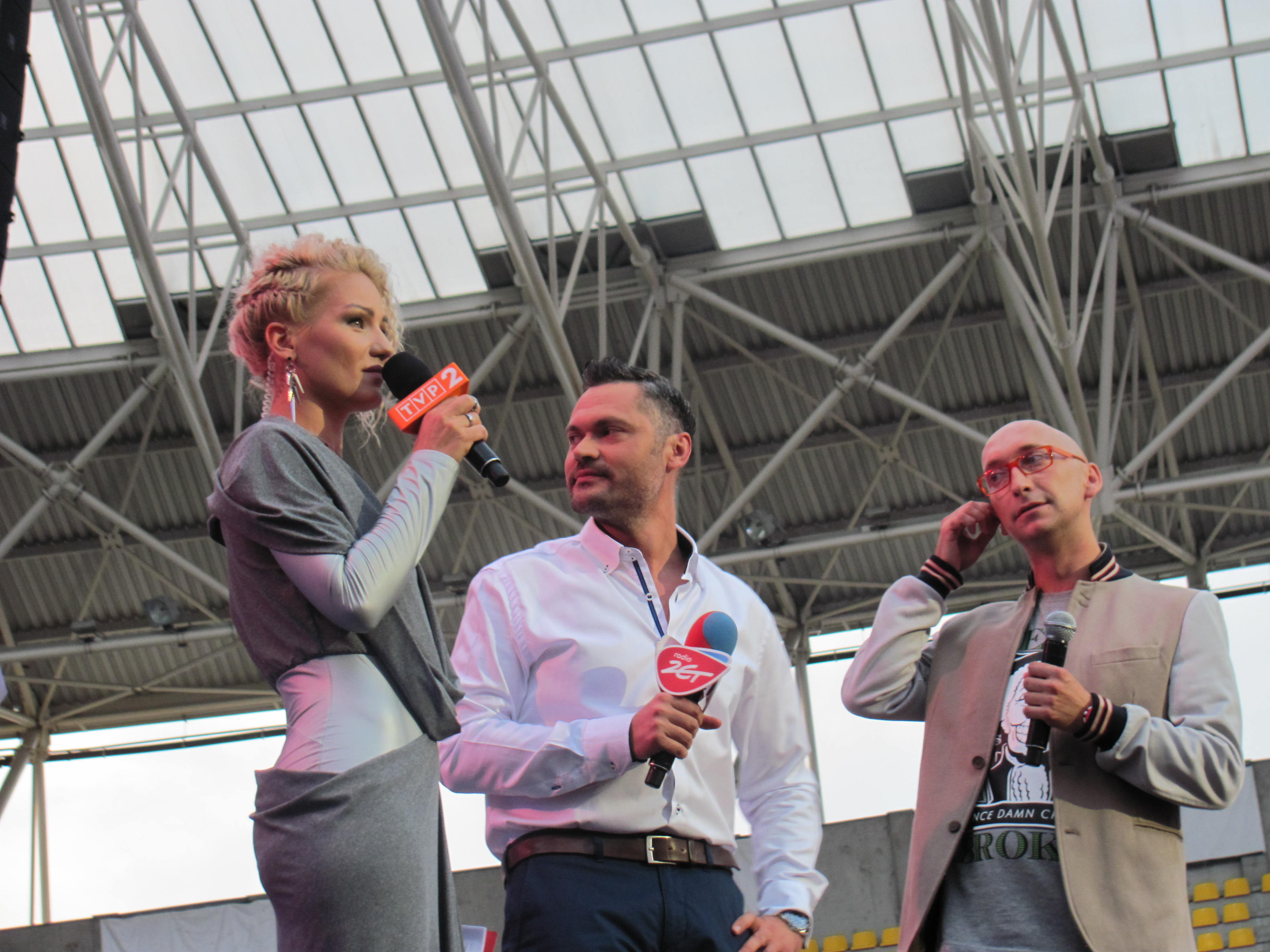
Hosts of the Lato Zet i Dwójki tour: Marika, Rafał Olejniczak and Kamil Nosel

Lato Zet i Dwójki 2014 was the fourth edition of the concert tour "Lato Zet i Dwójki," consisting of nine open-air concerts held in Kołobrzeg (twice), Słubice, Zielona Góra, Łódź, Toruń, Koszalin, Zabrze and Uniejów. Seven of these concerts were broadcast live on TVP2. The tour was hosted by Rafał Olejniczak and Marika (who was replaced by Anna Popek in Koszalin and Magdalena Mielcarz in Uniejów). Both presenters were supported by Radio ZET journalist Kamil Nosel.

The inaugural concert of the tour took place on 28 June in Kołobrzeg, while the final one was held on 24 August in Uniejów. It was the largest radio-television concert tour in Poland in 2014, featuring approximately 80 artists in total. The executive producer of the tour was Eurozet, with the daily newspaper Fakt serving as the media partner.

The entire tour attracted over 180,000 attendees, while the average television viewership was about 1,500,000 people.

Admission to the concerts was free. During each concert, a text-message voting system determined the best performance of the evening, with the winner performing the victorious song again at the end of the show. The winners of the individual competition days included: Pectus (twice, with Barcelona), Poparzeni Kawą Trzy (Byłaś dla mnie wszystkim), Anna Wyszkoni (Na cześć wariata), Liber and Natalia Szroeder (Nie patrzę w dół), Lemon and Karolina Nawrocka (Wkręceni – Nie ufaj mi), and Kasia Popowska (Przyjdzie taki dzień).

== Kołobrzeg, 28 June 2014 ==
The concert was not broadcast on television. On this day, only two music groups performed: Hamak Band and Lemon. The recital by the Pectus group, despite the presence of artists, did not take place due to heavy rainfall. Halina Mlynkova was also supposed to appear on stage, but she canceled her performance for health reasons.

== Kołobrzeg, 29 June 2014 ==
The first live broadcast concert of the Lato Zet i Dwójki 2014 tour took place on 29 June 2014 in Kołobrzeg. The stage was located on the beach near Kamienny Szaniec at Sułkowski Street. The entire concert was hosted by Rafał Olejniczak, with Marika accompanying him. During the concert, viewers voted via SMS to award a prize for the best performance, which was ultimately won by the band Pectus for their rendition of the song Barcelona.

International special guests included Eddy Wata and Kate Ryan, who performed not only competition songs but also Voyage, voyage. Additionally, Jula performed Nieśmiertelni and Edyta Górniak sang Your High and Teraz – tu outside the competition.

=== Competition performances ===
No.	Artist	Song	Source
1.	Donatan and Cleo	My Słowianie	
2.	Eddy Wata	I Love My People	
3.	Eddy Wata	I Wa le Wa	
4.	Lemon	Wkręceni – Nie ufaj mi	
5.	Pectus	Barcelona	
6.	Pectus	Jeden moment	
7.	Mateusz Ziółko	I Want to Break Free (Queen cover)	
8.	Honorata Skarbek	Nie powiem jak	
9.	Honorata Skarbek	GPS	
10.	Eddy Wata	My Dream	
11.	Kate Ryan	Ella, elle l'a	
12.	Kate Ryan	Désenchantée	
13.	Donatan and Cleo	Cicha woda	
14.	Jula	Za każdym razem	
15.	Lemon	Napraw	
16.	Lemon	Ake	
17.	Michał Szyc	A Whiter Shade of Pale (Procol Harum cover)	

== Słubice, 11 July 2014 ==
The second live broadcast concert of the Lato Zet i Dwójki 2014 tour took place on 11 July 2014 in Słubice. The stage was located at the SOSiR Stadium on 1 Sportowa Street. The event was hosted by Rafał Olejniczak and Marika, with special guest Szymon Majewski, who on that day signed a work contract with Radio ZET. During the concert, viewers voted via SMS for the best performance, which was ultimately awarded to the band Poparzeni Kawą Trzy for their performance of Byłaś dla mnie wszystkim. During the event, the Blue Café band was awarded for 15 years of presence in the Polish music market.

Around 10,000 people watched the concert in front of the stage. Apart from the competition, Sylwia Grzeszczak performed on stage, delivering a medley of the songs Sen o przyszłości, Małe rzeczy, Karuzela, Pożyczony and Księżniczka. The band Enej also performed, additionally presenting their single Tak smakuje życie from their album Folkhorod.

=== Competition performances ===
No.	Artist	Song	Source
1.	Oceana	Endless Summer	
2.	Oceana	Everybody	
3.	Blue Café	Buena	
4.	Blue Café	Do nieba, do piekła / Lambada (Kaoma cover)	
5.	Grzegorz Hyży	Na chwilę	
6.	Mrozu feat. Tomson	Jak nie my to kto	
7.	Poparzeni Kawą Trzy	Byłaś dla mnie wszystkim	
8.	Poparzeni Kawą Trzy	Wezmę Cię	
9.	Afromental	Rock & Rollin' Love	
10.	Enej	Symetryczno-liryczna	
11.	Enej	Lili	
12.	Mrozu feat. Sound'n'Grace	Nic do stracenia	
13.	Anna F.	DNA	
14.	Afromental	Mental House	
15.	Aneta Sablik	Dirty Diana (Michael Jackson cover)	
16.	Aneta Sablik	The One	

== Zielona Góra, 20 July 2014 ==
The third live broadcast concert of the Lato Zet i Dwójki 2014 tour took place on 20 July 2014 in Zielona Góra. The concert was held in the parking lot near the swimming pool in Zielona Góra, at 41 Sulechowska Street. During the concert, viewers voted via SMS for the best performance, which was ultimately awarded to Anna Wyszkoni for her performance of Na cześć wariata. The host mentioned that it was a birthday gift for the singer, who celebrated her birthday the following day.

The international special guests at the concert were Ozark Henry and Kim Cesarion, who, after his performance, received a bag of plush toys and a bra from his fans. After the competition portion of the concert, Justyna Steczkowska performed her recital, delivering the songs Dziewczyna Szamana and Za karę.

=== Competition performances ===
No.	Artist	Song	Source
1.	De Mono	Póki na to czas	
2.	Anna Wyszkoni	Czy ten pan i pani	
3.	Kim Cesarion	Undressed	
4.	Kim Cesarion	I Love This Life	
5.	Łukasz Zagrobelny	Mówisz i masz	
6.	Vox	Bananowy song	
7.	Kasia Wilk	Pierwszy raz / Ayo Technology (Katerine Avgoustakis cover)	
8.	De Mono	Statki na niebie / Nigdy tak jak dziś	
9.	Myslovitz	Długość dźwięku samotności	
10.	Łukasz Zagrobelny	Dotrę do Ciebie	
11.	Ozark Henry	I'm Your Sacrifice	
12.	Ozark Henry	This One's For You	
13.	Anna Wyszkoni	Na cześć wariata	
14.	Siostry Hybiak	Don't Let Go (Love) (En Vogue cover)	
15.	Vox	Tęczowy most	
16.	Myslovitz	Telefon	

== Łódź, 26 July 2014 ==
The concert was not broadcast on television. At Manufaktura in Łódź, at 58 Drewnowska Street, Edyta Górniak, DJ Adamus the band De Mono performed their songs.

== Toruń, 27 July 2014 ==
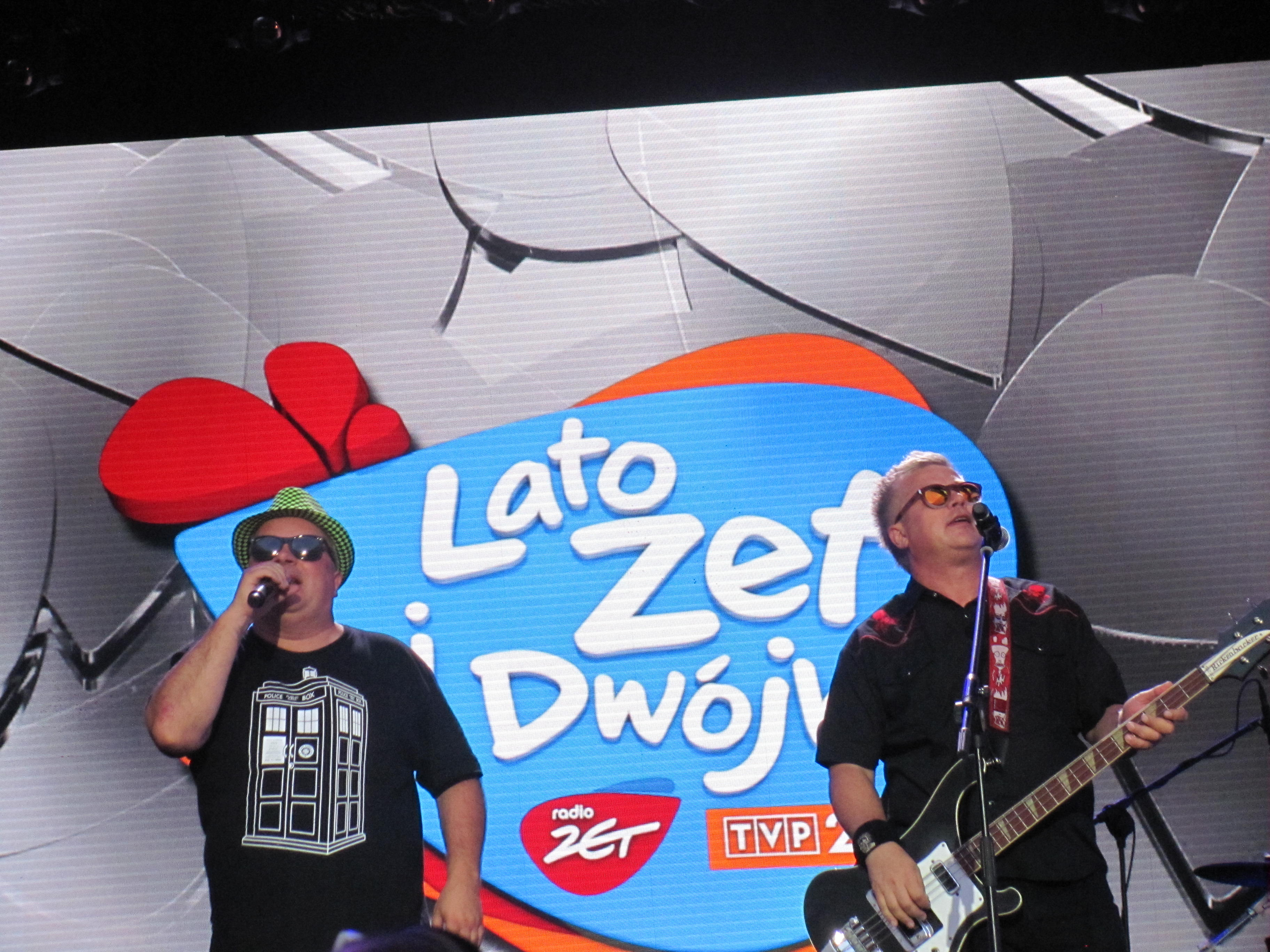
Krzysztof Skiba and Jacek Jędrzejak from the band Big Cyc during their performance in Toruń

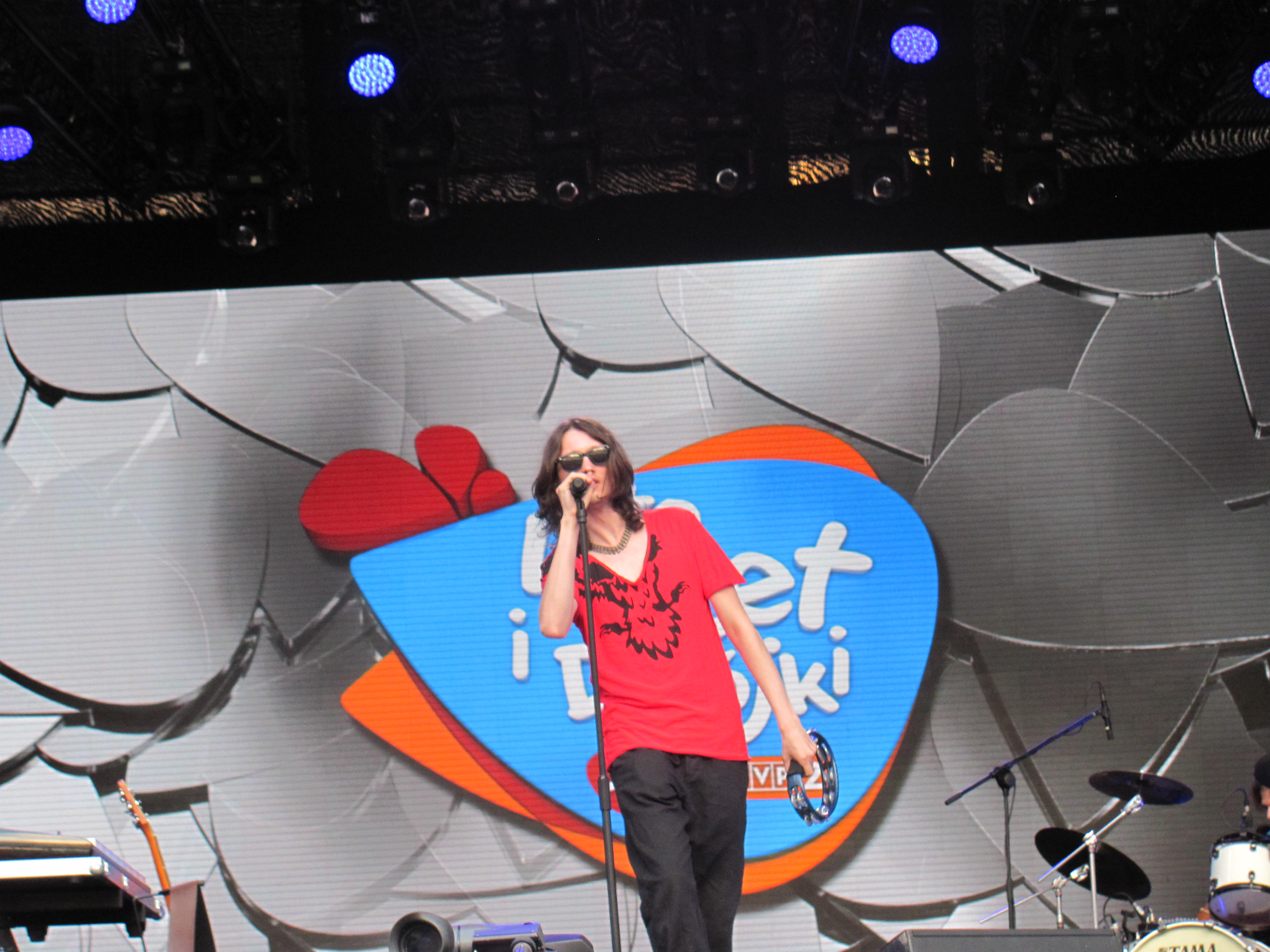
Maciej Tacher from the band Manchester during their performance in Toruń

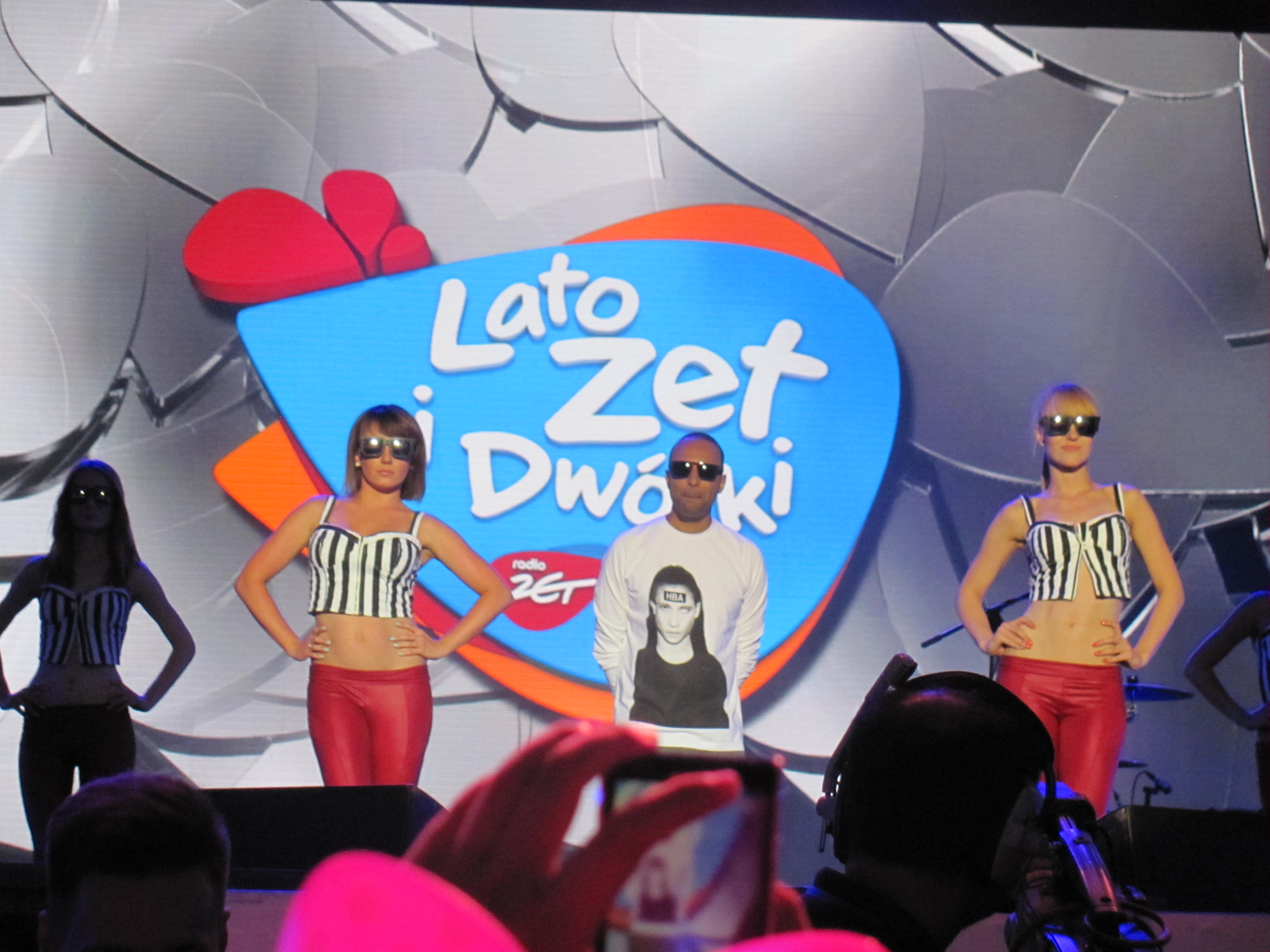
Arash accompanied by dancers during his contest performance in Toruń

The fourth live broadcast concert of the Lato Zet i Dwójki 2014 tour took place on 27 July 2014 in Toruń. The stage was set at the MotoArena Toruń speedway stadium, at 7 Per Jonsson Street. During the concert, viewers voted via SMS for the best performance, which was ultimately awarded to the duet Natalia Szroeder and Liber for their performance of Nie patrzę w dół.

During the event, Kasia Kowalska was presented with a symbolic bouquet of flowers and a cake to celebrate 20 years of her presence in the Polish music market and the debut of her album Gemini, which sold over 400,000 copies. The singer also performed Tak... tak... to ja as a tribute to Grzegorz Ciechowski, who was from Toruń.

Maria Sadowska also received an award, a gold disc for her album Jazz na ulicach, and as a thank you, she performed the single Life Is a Beat.

=== Competition performances ===
No.	Artist	Song	Source
1.	Arash	Boro Boro	
2.	Margaret	Wasted	
3.	Big Cyc	Makumba	
4.	Big Cyc	Rudy się żeni	
5.	Natalia Szroeder and Liber	Wszystkiego na raz	
6.	Kombii	Słodkiego miłego życia	
7.	Kombii	Jak pierwszy raz	
8.	Urszula	Dmuchawce, latawce, wiatr	
9.	Urszula	Twoje zdrowie mała	
10.	Margaret	Thank You Very Much	
11.	Arash	Sex Love Rock n Roll (SLR)	
12.	Natalia Szroeder and Liber	Nie patrzę w dół	
13.	Michał Szyc	Peron (Jamal cover)	
14.	Claydee	Mamacita Buena	
15.	Kasia Kowalska	Spowiedź	
16.	Kasia Kowalska	Antidotum	
17.	Kasia Kowalska	Tak... tak... to ja (Obywatel GC cover)	
18.	Manchester	Dziewczyna gangstera	
19.	Maria Sadowska and Juan Carlos Cano	Bad (Michael Jackson cover)	

== Koszalin, 3 August 2014 ==
The fifth live broadcast concert of the Lato Zet i Dwójki 2014 tour took place on 3 August 2014 in Koszalin. The concert was held on the stage of the Ignacy Jan Paderewski Amphitheater. During the event, seven top Polish artists performed on stage alongside debuting vocalists who competed for the "Na Fali" festival statuette and a cash prize of 10,000 PLN. The musical amateurs for the duets were selected through a casting process. During the concert, viewers voted via SMS for the best performance, which was ultimately won by the band Lemon, who performed Wkręceni – Nie ufaj mi together with Karolina Nawrocka. The concert was hosted by Rafał Olejniczak and Anna Popek, with special guest Cezary Pazura.

The event was opened by Donatan and Cleo, who performed My Słowianie. They were supported by models Paula Tumala and Ola Ciupa. The duo received the first-ever statuette for the Breakthrough Duo of the Year, awarded by the authorities of the city of Koszalin as part of the "Na Fali" festival.

In addition to the competition portion, special guests also performed solo with their greatest hits. The following artists presented their songs: Margaret (Thank You Very Much), Bracia (Po drugiej stronie chmur), Mesajah (Szukając szczęścia), Lombard (Przeżyj to sam), Ewelina Lisowska (We mgle) and the band Lemon, who premiered the single Scarlett, promoting their second studio album. The star of the evening was Edyta Górniak, who received the "Bursztynowa Fala" statuette from the president of Koszalin, Piotr Jedliński. The singer performed Perfect Heart, Teraz – tu, Your High, Nie zapomnij and Szyby.

During the concert, Kamil Nosel distributed apples to the audience as part of the "Eat apples to spite Putin" campaign.

=== Contest performances ===
No.	Artist	Song	Source
1.	Margaret and Eddie E-Five	Wasted	
2.	Bracia and Igor Marinow	Wierzę w lepszy świat	
3.	Ewa Farna and Patrycja Nowicka	Znak	
4.	Mesajah and Dawid Albaaj	Lepsza połowa	
5.	Lombard and Kuba Leciej	Szklana pogoda	
6.	Ewelina Lisowska and Patrycja Zarychta	W stronę słońca	
7.	Lemon and Karolina Nawrocka	Wkręceni – Nie ufaj mi	

== Zabrze, 17 August 2014 ==
The sixth live broadcast concert of the Lato Zet i Dwójki 2014 tour took place on 17 August 2014 in Zabrze. The concert was held at the square near the Aquarius swimming pool at 18 Wojciech Korfanty Avenue. During the event, viewers voted via SMS for the best performance, with Kasia Popowska winning for her rendition of Przyjdzie taki dzień. The band Feel also performed outside of the competition and premiered their song Taki Twój los.

=== Contest performances ===
No.	Artist	Song	Source
1.	Rafał Brzozowski	Tak blisko	
2.	Sunrise Avenue	Fairytale Gone Bad	
3.	Red Lips (band)	To co nam było	
4.	Bracia	Wierzę w lepszy świat	
5.	Bracia	Nad przepaścią	
6.	Nabiha	Mind The Gap	
7.	Nabiha	Bang That Drum	
8.	Katarzyna Sawczuk	Let It Be (The Beatles cover)	
9.	Patrycja Markowska	Everybody Needs Somebody to Love (The Blues Brothers cover), Poszłabym za tobą (Breakout cover), Hush (Deep Purple cover)	
10.	Patrycja Markowska and Artur Gadowski	Ocean	
11.	Feel	A gdy jest już ciemno	
12.	Sunrise Avenue	Hollywood Hills	
13.	Sunrise Avenue	Lifesaver	
14.	Ira	Szczęśliwego Nowego Jorku	
15.	Kasia Popowska	Przyjdzie taki dzień	
16.	Rafał Brzozowski	Magiczne słowa (Ziyo cover)	
17.	Szymon Wydra & Carpe Diem	Życie jak poemat	
18.	Szymon Wydra & Carpe Diem feat. Marie Napieralska	Duch	
19.	Patrycja Markowska	Nim się zamienisz w żart	

== Uniejów, 24 August 2014 ==
The final and seventh live-broadcast concert of the Lato Zet i Dwójki 2014 tour took place on 24 August 2014 in Uniejów. The stage was set near the thermal baths at 3/5 Zamkowa Street. During the concert, viewers voted via SMS for the best performance, which was won for the second time by the band Pectus for their song Barcelona. The event was hosted by Rafał Olejniczak and Magdalena Mielcarz.

The concert opened with a performance by the band Wilki, who performed the songs Baśka and Nie stało się nic outside the competition. Additionally, Margaret premiered the song O mnie się nie martw, which served as the theme song for a television series of the same name. Special guest Edyta Górniak appeared for the third time during the tour. Her single Your High had topped Radio ZET's charts for over three months. She performed Teraz – tu and a remix of Your High.

=== Contest performances ===
No.	Artist	Song	Source
1.	Margaret	Wasted	
2.	Margaret	O mnie się nie martw (Katarzyna Sobczyk cover)	
3.	Grzegorz Hyży	Na chwilę / Wstaję	
4.	Lemon	Wkręceni – Nie ufaj mi	
5.	Afromental	It's My Life	
6.	Pectus	Barcelona	
7.	Pectus	Szkoła marzeń	
8.	Mr. Probz	Waves	
9.	Donatan and Cleo	My Słowianie	
10.	Lemon	Scarlett	
11.	Afromental	Rock & Rollin' Love	
12.	Afromental	Mental House	
13.	Janusz Panasewicz	Między nami nie ma już	
14.	Meri	Sestra	
15.	Juan Carlos Cano	Nadzieja (cover of IRA)	
16.	Enclose	Lesson Learned	
17.	Donatan and Cleo	Nie lubimy robić	
