= TOPtrendy 2013 =

Festival in Poland

The 11th Sopot TOPtrendy Festival took place from 7 to 9 June 2013 at the Forest Opera in Sopot, Poland. The festival was organized by Polsat television, which broadcast the event on its channel. A live broadcast was also available online via the Ipla platform.

On the first day, three concerts took place: the 25th anniversary celebration of the band Big Cyc, the TOP Concert, and the 20th anniversary celebration of the band Hey. On the second day, two concerts were held: Greatest Hits of the Year and the Trendy Contest. On the third day, the 10th Sopot Night of Cabaret took place.

== Organization ==
On 28 March 2013, Polsat television announced the organization of the 11th edition of the Sopot TOPtrendy Festival, scheduled for 7 to 9 June. Konrad Stachurski was appointed as the festival's spokesperson. On the same day, the television network began accepting applications for the Trendy Contest, which debuting artists could submit until April 21. Four days later, the organizers informed the public that the festival would take place at the Forest Opera in Sopot after a four-year break due to the renovation of the amphitheater.

On May 7, Polsat presented the detailed plan for the festival, which was to feature five concerts. The three-day event was to open with a concert celebrating the 25th anniversary of the band Big Cyc. Following that would be the TOP Concert, where artists with the highest album sales from the previous year (Ania, Andrzej Piaseczny, Seweryn Krajewski, Coma, Hey, Kamil Bednarek, Maria Peszek, Artur Andrus, Donatan, and Kazik na Żywo) were invited to perform on the Forest Opera stage. The first day was set to close with a concert commemorating the 20th anniversary of the band Hey.

On the second day of the event, for the first time in the festival's history, the Greatest Hits of the Year concert was scheduled. Artists whose songs had been the most frequently played on Polish radio stations in the past year (Enej, LemON, Ewelina Lisowska, Loka, Jula, Liber and Natalia Szroeder, Łukasz Zagrobelny, Pectus, Rafał Brzozowski, Anna Wyszkoni, Sylwia Grzeszczak, and Margaret) were invited to perform in the Sopot amphitheater. The second day of the event also featured the Trendy Contest. Polsat television collected 358 submissions, though the names of the finalists were to be announced at a later date.

The final day of the festival was set for the Sopot Night of Cabaret, which would take place for the 10th time, with Poland's most popular satirists and cabarets invited to participate (including Ani Mru-Mru, Marcin Daniec, Cezary Pazura, Artur Andrus, MozART group, Jerzy Kryszak, Paranienormalni, Łowcy.B, Olaf Lubaszenko, Andrzej Grabowski, Rafał Rutkowski, Kabaret Moralnego Niepokoju, Magdalena Stużyńska, Kabaret Nowaki, and Kabaret Smile). The hosts of the festival included Agnieszka Popielewicz, Maciej Rock, Paulina Sykut-Jeżyna, Darek Maciborek, Maciej Dowbor, Igor Kwiatkowski, Robert Motyka, and Artur Andrus.

On May 26, the organizers announced the list of artists qualified for the Trendy Contest, selected by music journalists and representatives from Polsat: Paweł Sztompke (Polskie Radio Program I), Piotr Baron (Polskie Radio Program III), Dariusz Maciborek (RMF FM), Rafał Olejniczak (Radio ZET), Jarosław Barwiak (Radio Złote Przeboje), Marcin Sobesto (Radio PiN), Bogusław Potoniec (Radio Eska), Przemysław Grabowski (RMF Maxx), as well as Nina Terentiew (Polsat) and Marcin Perzyna (director of Sopot TOPtrendy Festival). The list of finalists included ten performers: Holly Blue, Kreuzberg, Dr Misio, Sebastian Riedel with the band Cree, Andrzej Bachleda, FairyTaleShow, Natalia Przybysz, Red Lips, Pączki w Tłuszczu, and Uniqplan.

== First day ==
=== 25th anniversary of the band Big Cyc ===
According to the program Sopot TOPtrendy Festival 2013, the concert celebrating the 25th anniversary of the band Big Cyc was scheduled for Friday, June 7, at 8:00 PM. In the Forest Opera, the group presented their hits. On stage, they were joined by special guests invited for this occasion, including Krzysztof Ibisz, Jerzy Połomski, Elżbieta Romanowska, Patrycja Pająk, Karolina Szostak, and Szymon Majewski. During the concert, Big Cyc received the Golden Bra award.

==== Songs performed during the concert ====
Sources:

- Makumba
- Berlin Zachodni
- Rudy się żeni
- Słoiki
- Każdy facet to świnia (with Elżbieta Romanowska)
- Dres
- Bo z dziewczynami (with Jerzy Połomski)
- Świat według Kiepskich

=== TOP Concert ===
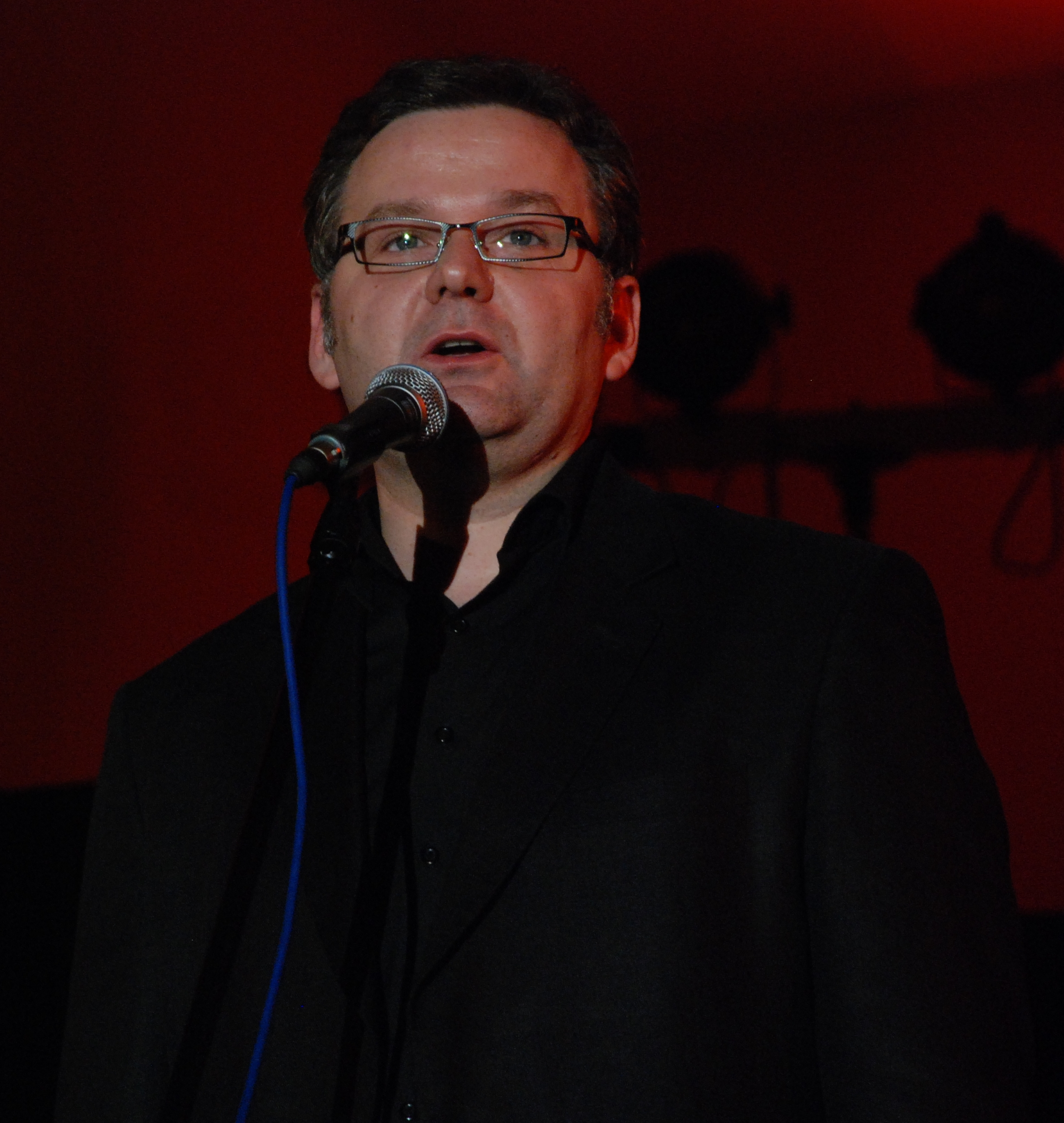
Artur Andrus – winner of the TOP Concert

The TOP Concert was scheduled for 9:00 PM according to the program for Sopot TOPtrendy Festival 2013. Ten artists with the highest number of albums sold in the previous year in Poland performed. The first place was taken by Artur Andrus with the album Myśliwiecka. The concert was hosted by Agnieszka Popielewicz and Maciej Rock.

==== TOP 10 ranking ====
Place	Performer	Album
1	Artur Andrus	Myśliwiecka
2	Andrzej Piaseczny	To co dobre
3	Kamil Bednarek	Jestem...
4	Maria Peszek	Jezus Maria Peszek
5	Kazik na Żywo	Bar La Curva / Plamy na słońcu
6	Andrzej Piaseczny and Seweryn Krajewski	Zimowe piosenki
7	Donatan	Równonoc. Słowiańska dusza
8	Ania	Bawię się świetnie
9	Coma	Czerwony album
10	Hey	Do rycerzy, do szlachty, doo mieszczan

==== Songs performed during the concert ====
- Hey – Co tam?
- Coma – Los, cebula i krokodyle łzy
- Ania – Jeszcze ten jeden raz and Charlie, Charlie
- Donatan – Nie lubimy robić (performed by Cleo) and Budź się (performed by Donguralesko)
- Andrzej Piaseczny – Pastorałka największych przyjaciół, To co dobre, to co lepsze, and Śniadanie do łóżka
- Kazik na Żywo – Artyści
- Maria Peszek – Ludzie psy, Sorry Polsko, and Pan nie jest moim pasterzem
- Kamil Bednarek – Jestem... (sobą) (and Staff) and Dni, których jeszcze nie znamy
- Artur Andrus – Piłem w Spale, spałem w Pile and Królowa nadbałtyckich raf

=== 20th anniversary of Hey ===
The next event in the Sopot TOPtrendy Festival 2013 program was a concert celebrating the 20th anniversary of Hey, scheduled for midnight. The group performed its greatest hits, joined by special guests they had invited: Czesław Mozil, Ania, Artur Rojek, and Andrzej Smolik. During the concert, Hey received a special award from the city of Sopot and a lifetime achievement statue from RMF FM radio.

==== Songs performed during the concert ====
Sources:

- Teksański
- List
- Kto tam, kto jest w środku? (with Czesław Mozil)
- Do rycerzy
- Mru Mru (with Ania)
- Ja sowa
- Muka (with Artur Rojek)
- Sic!
- Mimo wszystko (with Andrzej Smolik)
- Moja i twoja nadzieja

== Second day ==
=== Greatest Hits of the Year ===
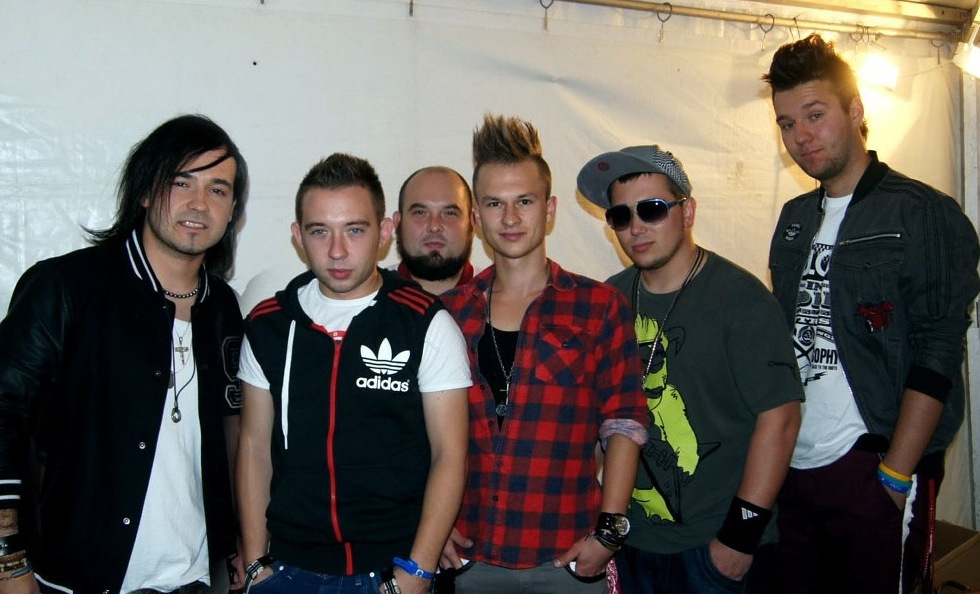
Enej – winners of the Greatest Hits of the Year concert

According to the program for Sopot TOPtrendy Festival 2013, the Greatest Hits of the Year concert began at 8:00 PM on Saturday, June 8. Twelve artists performed the most-played songs of the past year on Polish radio stations. Viewers voted via SMS for their favorite performance, with Tak smakuje życie by Enej ultimately winning. The concert was hosted by Paulina Sykut-Jeżyna and Darek Maciborek. Additionally, the winners of the fifth season of Must Be the Music, Piotr Szumlas and Jakub Zaborski, gave a special performance of I'll Be There for You by The Rembrandts.

==== Participants ====
No.	Performer	Song
1	Ewelina Lisowska	W stronę słońca
2	Rafał Brzozowski	Tak blisko
3	Anna Wyszkoni	W całość ułożysz mnie
4	LemON	Napraw
5	Sylwia Grzeszczak	Flirt
6	Enej	Tak smakuje życie
7	Margaret	Thank You Very Much
8	Łukasz Zagrobelny	U mnie maj
9	Natalia Szroeder and Liber	Wszystkiego na raz
10	Pectus	Barcelona
11	Loka	Prawdziwe powietrze
12	Jula	Nie zatrzymasz mnie

=== Trendy Competition ===
At 10:00 PM, the Trendy Competition began, in which ten debuting performers competed for the title of Trendy Artist and a promotional campaign on Polsat television. The participants were selected for the competition by music journalists and Polsat television earlier. The winner was Sebastian Riedel with the band Cree, chosen by viewers through SMS voting. The laureates also received a special prize from the listeners of RMF Maxx radio in the form of a promotional campaign on that station worth 100,000 PLN. Awards were also given to: Dr Misio (Journalists' Award), FairyTaleShow (Internet Users' Award), and Natalia Przybysz (Jury Award, guaranteeing a promotional campaign on RMF FM worth 100,000 PLN). The concert was hosted by Paulina Sykut-Jeżyna and Maciej Dowbor, as well as Igor Kwiatkowski and Robert Motyka from the Paranienormalni cabaret. Special performances were given by Ewa Farna, who premiered her single Znak, and Honorata Skarbek, who sang the song Nie powiem jak.

==== Participants ====
No.	Performer	Song
1	Andrzej Bachleda	Balanga
2	Kreuzberg	Niecierpliwa
3	Sebastian Riedel & Cree	Jestem tu dla Ciebie
4	Pączki w Tłuszczu	Tylko bądź
5	Natalia Przybysz	Niebieski
6	Uniqplan	This Makes Sense
7	FairyTaleShow	Was She Gonna
8	Holly Blue	Lemon
9	Red Lips	To co nam było
10	Dr Misio	Mentolowe papierosy

== Third day ==
=== 10th Sopot Cabaret Night ===
On Sunday, June 9, at 8:00 PM, the 10th Sopot Cabaret Night began, featuring some of Poland's most popular satirists and cabaret groups, with Artur Andrus as the host. Performers included Ani Mru-Mru, Cezary Pazura, Paranienormalni, Łowcy.B, MozART group, Ireneusz Krosny, Kabaret Młodych Panów, Kabaret Smile, Kabaret Nowaki, Rafał Rutkowski, Olaf Lubaszenko, Jerzy Kryszak, Marcin Daniec, Krzysztof Respondek, Kabaret Moralnego Niepokoju, Magdalena Stużyńska, Mikołaj Cieślak, Arkadiusz Janiczek, Michał Piela, Andrzej Grabowski, Kabaret Chyba, and Łukasz Jakóbiak.

== Festival reception in the media ==
The Sopot TOPtrendy Festival was considered one of the most important and popular festivals in Poland. Its 11th edition received positive feedback from the media, where praise was directed at the performers, some of whom were described by various outlets as "the biggest stars on the Polish music scene".

After the festival, however, some criticism was aimed at Kazik Staszewski (vocalist of the group Kazik na Żywo), who did not collect the award for his band's 5th place in the TOP Concert, and at the performance by Donguralesko and Donatan. During the TOP Concert, Donguralesko performed a song laden with profanity and concluded with the statement, "smoke, plant, legalize". One outlet also criticized Polsat television for scheduling the Hey band's anniversary concert at a late hour that was inconvenient for viewers.

The performance by Pączki w Tłuszczu during the Trendy Competition, however, drew the most attention from the media and internet users. The band's vocalist, Tomasz Karolak, was accused of singing off-key during the song Tylko bądź, with one portal calling his performance a "disaster".

Margaret's performance during the Biggest Hits of the Year concert also attracted media attention. She appeared on stage with scantily clad dancers, whose costumes seemed to be made of leaves.

The 11th edition of the Sopot TOPtrendy Festival was additionally criticized by Kuba Wojewódzki in an issue of Polityka, where he described it as "a mix of the Jarocin Festival with a local fair, barbecue, teleshopping, and harvest festival". In his column, he also criticized one of the festival's hosts, Maciej Rock, and Olaf Lubaszenko, who performed during the Sopot Cabaret Night.

== Viewership ==
The first day of the festival had an average viewership of 1,561,055, the second day reached 2,118,863 viewers, while the last day of the festival was followed by approximately 3,210,232 people. The average viewership for the entire festival was 2,304,427. During the broadcast, Polsat television was the market leader among competing stations. However, the festival attracted about 412,000 fewer viewers than the previous year.

Day of the festival	Viewership	Market share
First (7 June 2013)	1,561,055	14.52%
Second (8 June 2013)	2,118,863	19.91%
Third (9 June 2013)	3,210,232	29.11%
Average viewership	2,304,427	21.32%
