= Mozart group =

Mozart group may refer to:

- Mozart Group, a private military company
- MozART group, a cabaret and comedy string quartet
