= Barcelona (Pectus song) =

2019 song by Muniek Staszczyk

Single by Pectus

from the album Siła braci
- Released: 23 November 2012
- Genre: Pop
- Length: 3:18
- Label: Sony Music Entertainment Poland
- Songwriter: Tomasz Szczepaniak

Pectus singles chronology
"Dla Ciebie" (2012)	"Barcelona" (2012)	"Szkoła marzeń" (2013)

Music video
- "Barcelona" on YouTube

"Barcelona" (Polish: [bar.t͡sɛˈlɔ.na]) is a Polish-language pop single performed by Pectus band. It was released on 23 November 2012, on the Siła braci album, by the Sony Music Entertainment Poland. It has been written and composed by the band vocalist, Tomasz Szczepaniak.

== Reception ==
It has been noted on the 1st place on AirPlay Największe skoki, 4th on AirPlay Nowości, and 46th on AirPlay Top 100 lists by Polish Society of the Phonographic Industry. On 8 June 2013, it had been performed at the TOPtrendy 2013 festival in Sopot, Poland, at the Biggest Hits of the Year concert, which included the most played songs on the radio in Poland. On 29 June 2014, the song won in the best performance contest during the Lato Zet i Dwójki 2014 concert tour.

== Charts ==
Chart (2012)	Peak position
Poland (Airplay Top)	46
Poland (AirPlay Nowości)	4
Poland (AirPlay Największe skoki)	1
