= Porozumienie ponad podziałami =

Studio album by Kazik Na Żywo
- Released: September 24, 1995 (Poland)
- Recorded: August 1995, at Sonus studio (Łomianki) and at Winicjusz Chróst studio (Sulejówek)
- Genre: Rap metal, alternative metal
- Length: 58:09
- Label: S.P. Records
- Producer: Wojciech Przybylski

Kazik Na Żywo chronology
Na żywo, ale w studio (1994)	Porozumienie ponad podziałami (1995)	Las Maquinas de la Muerte (1999)

Porozumienie ponad podziałami is the second studio album by Polish rapcore band Kazik Na Żywo. It was released on September 24, 1995 in Poland through S.P. Records. The cover art was created by Jan Staszewski. Porozumienie ponad podziałami is considered the best album in whole Kazik Na Żywo carrier.

Porozumienie ponad podziałami is considered to be one of the most important albums in the history of Polish rock.

== Track listing ==
No.	Title	Length
1.	"Nitro"	0:20
2.	"Nie zrobimy wam nic złego, tylko dajcie nam jego (We Won't Do Anything To You, Just Give Him To Us)"	6:59
3.	"Przy słowie (Pro Verb)"	3:10
4.	"Odrzuć to! (Throw That Away!)"	3:46
5.	"Tańce wojenne (War Dances)"	3:27
6.	"Co się z tobą stanie gdy ci ufać przestanę (What Will Happen To You When I Stop Trusting You)"	3:49
7.	"Tata dilera / Hardzone (Dealer's Dad / Hardzone)"	6:11
8.	"Konsument (The Consumer)"	2:53
9.	"Mądrość tego świata (The Lore of this World)"	3:44
10.	"Dziewczyny (Girls)"	3:15
11.	"Stałem się sprawcą zgonu taty z powodu mej dumy z brata (I Became the Perpetrator of My Dad's Death Because of My Pride of My Brother)"	3:23
12.	"Tha luv"	3:55
13.	"Tata dilera / Hardzone (dyferencjalna wersja) (Dealer's Dad / Hardzone (Different Version))"	6:24

- 8. - music: Tomasz "Titus" Pukacki (Acid Drinkers)
- 10. - music: Kazimierz Staszewski i Jacek Kufirski
- 12. and 13. - first release only on CC

== Personnel ==
- Kazik Staszewski - vocal, guitar, lyrics
- Adam Burzyński - guitar
- Robert Friedrich - guitar, vocal
- Tomasz Goehs - drums, vocal
- Michał Kwiatkowski - bass, guitar
