= Na żywo, ale w studio =

Studio album by Kazik Na Żywo
- Released: April 1994 (Poland)
- Recorded: 1992, Łódź; January 1994, Warsaw
- Genre: Rap metal
- Length: 68:21
- Label: S.P. Records
- Producer: Wojciech Przybylski, Wiesław Grzelak

Kazik Na Żywo chronology
Na żywo, ale w studio (1994)	Porozumienie ponad podziałami (1995)

Na żywo, ale w studio is the debut studio album by Polish rapcore band Kazik Na Żywo. It was released in April 1994 in Poland through S.P. Records (LP and CC version). The album was recorded in 1992, Łódź ("Celina" and "Spalam się") and January 1994, Warsaw. Song "Artyści" have a lead riff from Kr'shna Brothers track "We know how to kill".

The cover art was created by Jan Staszewski.

== Track listing ==
No.	Title	Writer(s)	Length
1.	"Celina"	Stanisław Staszewski	3:47
2.	"Spalam się (I'm Burning)"	Kazik Na Żywo	4:37
3.	"Artyści (Artists)"	Kazik Na Żywo	2:44
4.	"Kalifornia ponad wszystko (California über alles)"	Music: Greenway; Lyrics: Jello Biafra	2:25
5.	"Piosenka trepa (Soldier's Song)"	Kazik Na Żywo	3:30
6.	"100000000"	Kazik Na Żywo	3:31
7.	"Raz pierwszy (Time First)"	Kazik Na Żywo	2:58
8.	"Biały Gibson (White Gibson)"	Kazik Na Żywo	4:04
9.	"Nie ma litości (No Mercy)"	Kazik Na Żywo	3:28
10.	"Spalaj się! (Burn!)"	Music: Jacek Kufirski; Lyrics: Kazimierz Staszewski	3:39
11.	"Tak się robi historię (That's How You Make History)"	Music: Adam Burzyński; Lyrics: Kazimierz Staszewski, Adam Bielak	4:49
12.	"Mama prosiła (Mama Asked)"	Kazik Na Żywo	3:47
13.	"300000000"	Kazik Na Żywo	2:42
14.	"Świadomość (Consciousness/Awareness)"	Music: Piotr Strembicki; Lyrics: Kazimierz Staszewski	4:01
15.	"Odpad atomowy (Atomic Waste)"	Mirosław Jędras	1:05
16.	"I ty zostaniesz Indianinem (You'll Become an Indian As Well)"	Kazik Na Żywo	1:36
17.	"Pieśń solidarności bluesmenów / Wspomnienia sekretarki (The Song of the Bluesmen Solidarity / The Memories of an Answering Machine)"	Kazik Na Żywo	15:38
Total length:			68:21

== Personnel ==
- Kazik Staszewski - vocal, lyrics
- Adam Burzyński - guitar, backing vocals
- Jakub Jabłoński - drums
- Michał Kwiatkowski - bass, backing vocals
- Krzysztof Banasik, Maciej Lissowski, Rafał Nowakowski, Paweł Srokowski, Sławomir Pietrzak - vocal
- Marek Bychawski - trumpet
- Paweł Walczak - piano
