= Jerzy Połomski =

Polish singer (1933–2022)

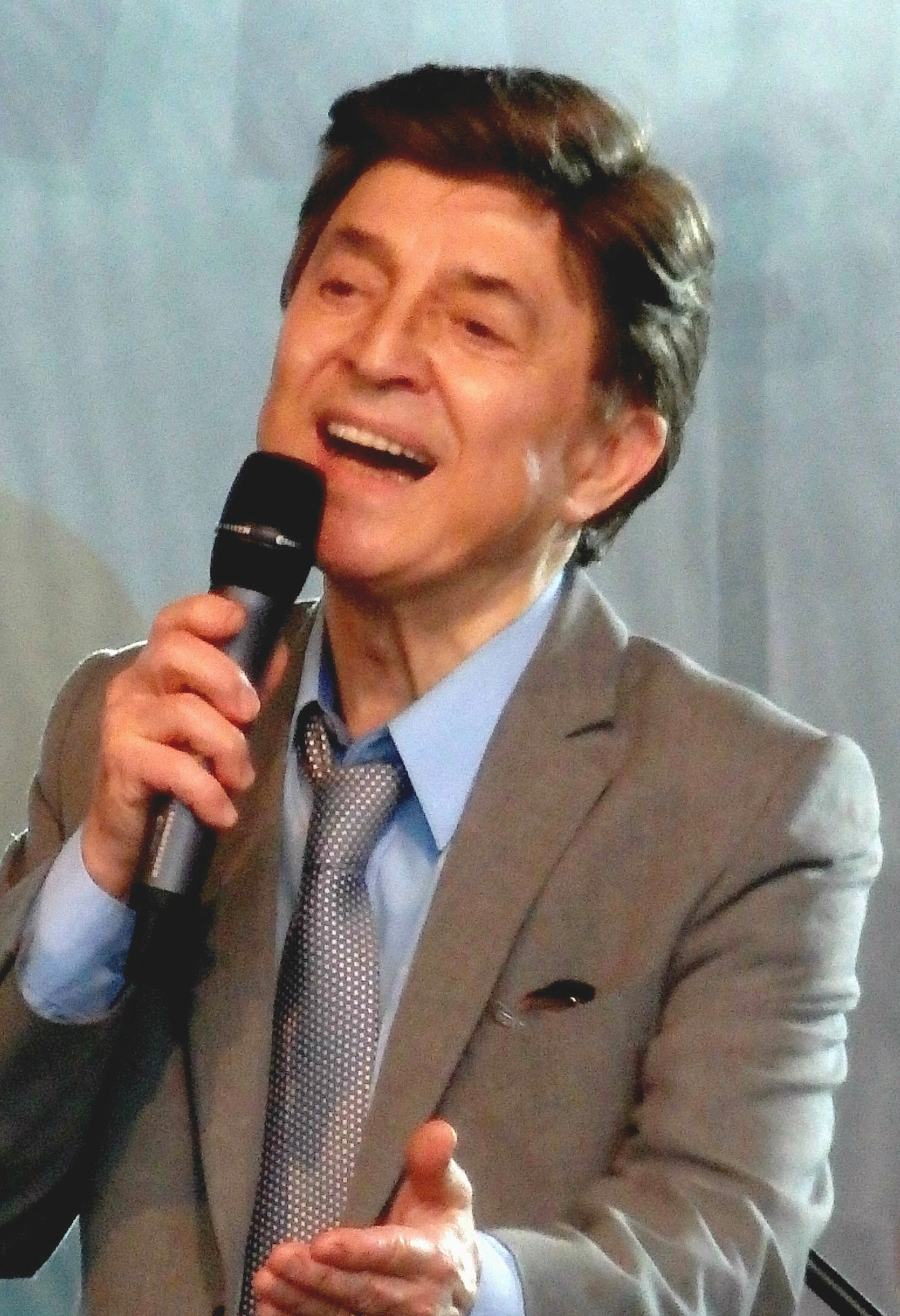
- Połomski in 2014
- Born: 18 September 1933; Radom, Poland
- Died: 14 November 2022 (aged 89); Warsaw, Poland
- Education: National Academy of Dramatic Art in Warsaw
- Occupation: Singer
- Years active: 1957–2019

Jerzy Połomski (born Jerzy Pająk; 18 September 1933 – 14 November 2022) was a Polish pop singer and actor. He is widely considered among the most popular Polish music artists of the 1960s and 1970s.

== Life and career ==
Born in Radom, Pająk adopted the surname Połomski while he was still a student at the State Higher School of Theater in Warsaw. He started his career in 1957, both as a stage actor specialized in dramatic roles as well as a singer active in radio broadcasts; in 1958 he ranked second in a poll held by Polskie Radio about most popular Polish singers, and one year later he made his recording debut with the album Podwieczorek z piosenką. In 1961 he placed at the second place at the first edition of the Sopot International Song Festival. In the following years he got a string of hits, including "Bo z dziewczynami" (audience award at the 1973 Opole Song Festival), "Komu piosenka", "Daj" and "Cała sala śpiewa z nami", and toured in Eastern and Western Europe, USSR, USA and Cuba.

During his career Połomski received various honours, notably the Medal for Merit to Culture – Gloria Artis and a Golden Fryderyk Award for his career. Suffering from hearing problems, he officially retired in 2019. He died on 14 November 2022, at the age of 89.

== See also ==
- Music of Poland
- List of Polish music artists
