= Bar La Curva / Plamy na słońcu =

Studio album by Kazik Na Żywo
- Released: 28 November 2011 (Poland)
- Recorded: September – October 2011, Lubrza
- Genre: Rock, rapcore, punk rock
- Length: 56:34
- Label: S. P. Records

Kazik Na Żywo chronology
Występ (2002)	Bar La Curva / Plamy na słońcu (2011)

Bar La Curva / Plamy Na Słońcu (Bar La Curva / Spots on the Sun) is the fourth studio album by Polish rock/rapcore band Kazik Na Żywo. It is the band's first studio album since 1999's Las Maquinas de la Muerte.

== Track listing ==
No.	Title	Length
1.	"Bar La Curva"	3:01
2.	"Mój synku (My sonny)"	3:37
3.	"Hanna Gronkowiec walczy (Hanna Staphylococcus fights)"	2:48
4.	"Czemu, ah czemu? (Why, oh why?)"	4:44
5.	"Marzenia swoje miej (Have thy dreams)"	2:38
6.	"Przecięty na pół (Cut in half)"	3:14
7.	"Jak zło się rodzi? (How is evil born?)"	3:14
8.	"Polska jest ważna (Poland is important)"	2:55
9.	"Plamy na słońcu (Spots on the sun)"	6:16
10.	"Nie ma boga (God is away)"	3:22
11.	"Nikomu nie cofam poparcia (I don't revoke my support for anyone)"	6:46
12.	"Szybciej! (Faster!)"	5:36
13.	"Skończyłem się (I have ended)"	5:55
14.	"Ballada o Janku Wiśniewskim (The ballad of Janek Wiśniewski)"	2:17

- 14 - lyrics by Krzysztof Dowgiałło, music by Mieczysław Cholewa.

== Personnel ==
- Kazik Staszewski - vocal, lyrics
- Adam Burzyński - guitar, mixing
- Robert Friedrich - guitar, mixing
- Tomasz Goehs - drums
- Michał Kwiatkowski - bass, lyrics
