= My Słowianie =

2013 song by Donatan and Cleo

Single by Donatan and Cleo

from the album Hiper/Chimera
- Released: 4 November 2013
- Recorded: 2013
- Studio: Gorycki & Sznyterman Studio, Kraków
- Genre: Folk; hip hop; R&B
- Length: 3:10
- Label: Urban Rec
- Composer: Witold Czamara
- Lyricist: Joanna Klepko
- Producer: Donatan

Donatan singles chronology
| "Z samym sobą" (2012) | "My Słowianie" (2013) | "Cicha woda" (2014) |

Cleo singles chronology
| "My Słowianie" (2013) | "Cicha woda" (2014) |

Music video
- "My Słowianie" on YouTube

Eurovision Song Contest 2014 entry
- Country: Poland
- Artists: Donatan and Cleo
- Languages: Polish, English
- Composer: Witold Czamara
- Lyricist: Joanna Klepko

Finals performance
- Semi-final result: 8th
- Semi-final points: 70
- Final result: 14th
- Final points: 62

Entry chronology
- ◄ "Jestem" (2011)
- "In the Name of Love" (2015) ►

Song presentation
- file; help

Official performance video
- "My Słowianie" (Final) on YouTube

"My Słowianie" (English: We Slavs), also known as "My Słowianie – We Are Slavic", is a song by Polish record producer Donatan and singer Cleo. It was released on 4 November 2013 as a digital download. The song reached number two in the Polish Airplay Chart. It represented Poland at the Eurovision Song Contest 2014 in Copenhagen, Denmark, where it reached 14th place overall. The performance generated mild controversy for its suggestive elements.

== Background and release ==
The song was a parody of Polish stereotypes, aimed at internal conservatism and external images of Poland as being backwards and behind-the-times.

It was recorded in Kraków Gorycki & Sznyterman. Mixing and mastering was done by the Delight band member Jarosław "Jaro" Baran. The song is available in two versions; the Polish as "My Słowianie" and the English as "Slavic Girls" that was prepared for international music TV channels. "Slavic Girls" was played e.g. in Austria, Germany, Hungary and the UK.

The song was performed in a mix of these two languages at Eurovision. However, Donatan, who acts as the producer of the song, was not on stage at the event.

== Music video ==
The music video was released on 4 November 2013 and was directed by Piotr Smoleński. The video was shot in the Museum of Agriculture (Muzeum Rolnictwa) in Ciechanowiec. The video features the Song and Dance Ensemble of the Warsaw University, "Warszawianka".

The video hit 15 million views on YouTube in less than three weeks. In May 2014, the music video received more than 44 million views for the Polish version and about 6 million views for its English version (together on VEVO and official Eurovision profile on YouTube), so "My Słowianie" became the most popular Eurovision song in history according to Internet views.

The video stars model Kamila Smogulecka who is also known as Luxuria Astaroth.

== 2014 Eurovision performance ==
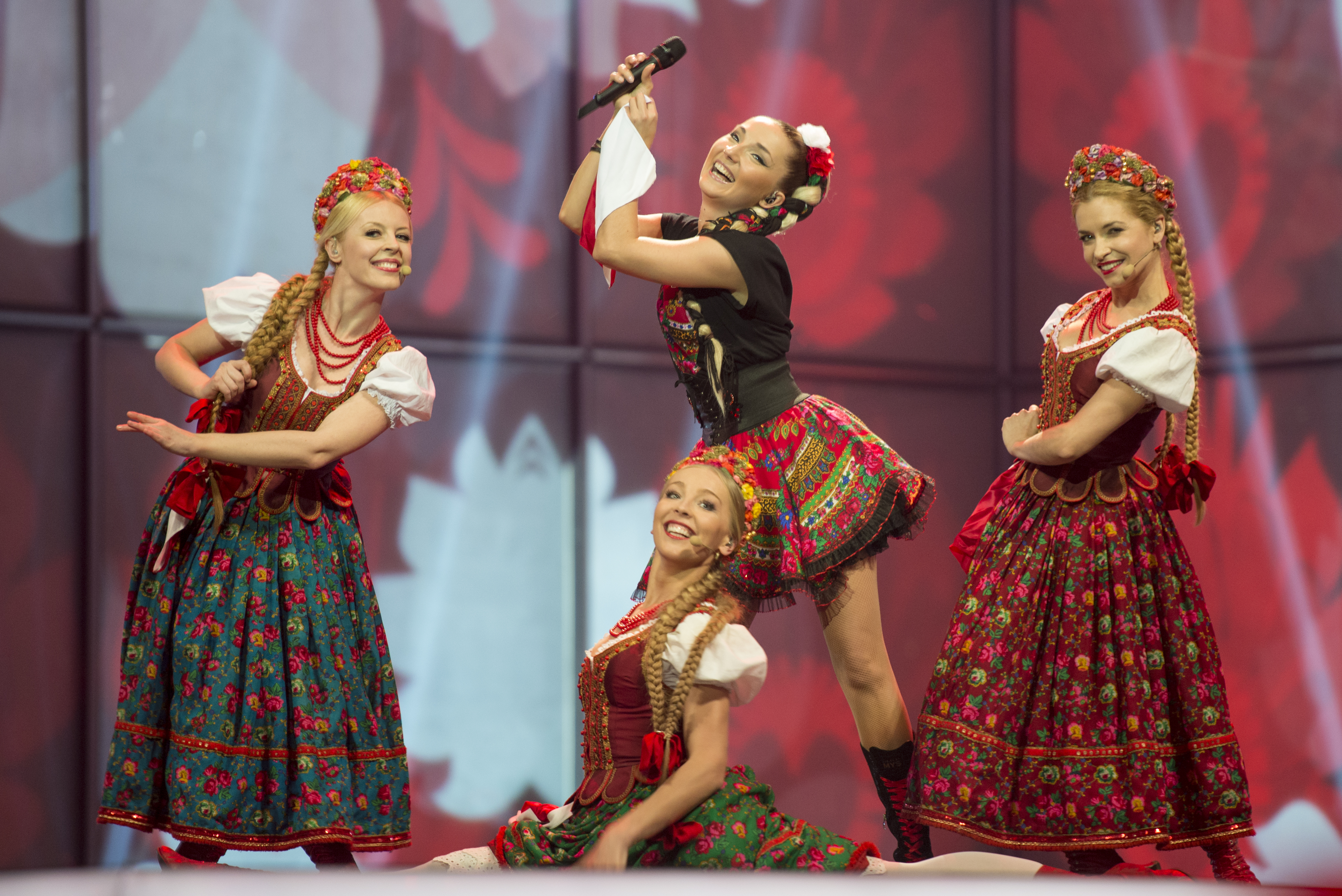

My Słowianie was chosen as Poland's entry for the Eurovision Song Contest 2014 in Copenhagen, Denmark. The performance featured dancers in traditional Polish costumes. Two of the performers were displaying significant cleavage, one of whom was churning butter and the other washing clothing with a washboard, both with suggestive movements.

The self-parody came top of televoting in Ireland and the United Kingdom, but came last in both jury panels, therefore gaining no points overall from the two countries. Laura Wright, an English singer on the United Kingdom's 2014 Eurovision jury panel, commented "I'd say it was soft porn. It was two boobs too far for me. I was shocked to see something like that on a family show."

This has caused controversy as Poland was ranked 5th in the public televote, with 162 points (top marks from the United Kingdom, Ireland, Norway and Ukraine).

The staging was parodied again during Eurovision Song Contest 2023 where Mel Giedroyc, who is of Polish descent, in a traditional dress, was seen churning butter in the background of one of the segments.

== Charts ==
| Chart (2013–14) | Peak position |
|---|---|
| Poland Airplay (ZPAV) | 2 |
| Poland Dance (ZPAV) | 6 |

== See also ==
- Poland in the Eurovision Song Contest 2014
