= Lombard (band) =

Polish pop-rock band

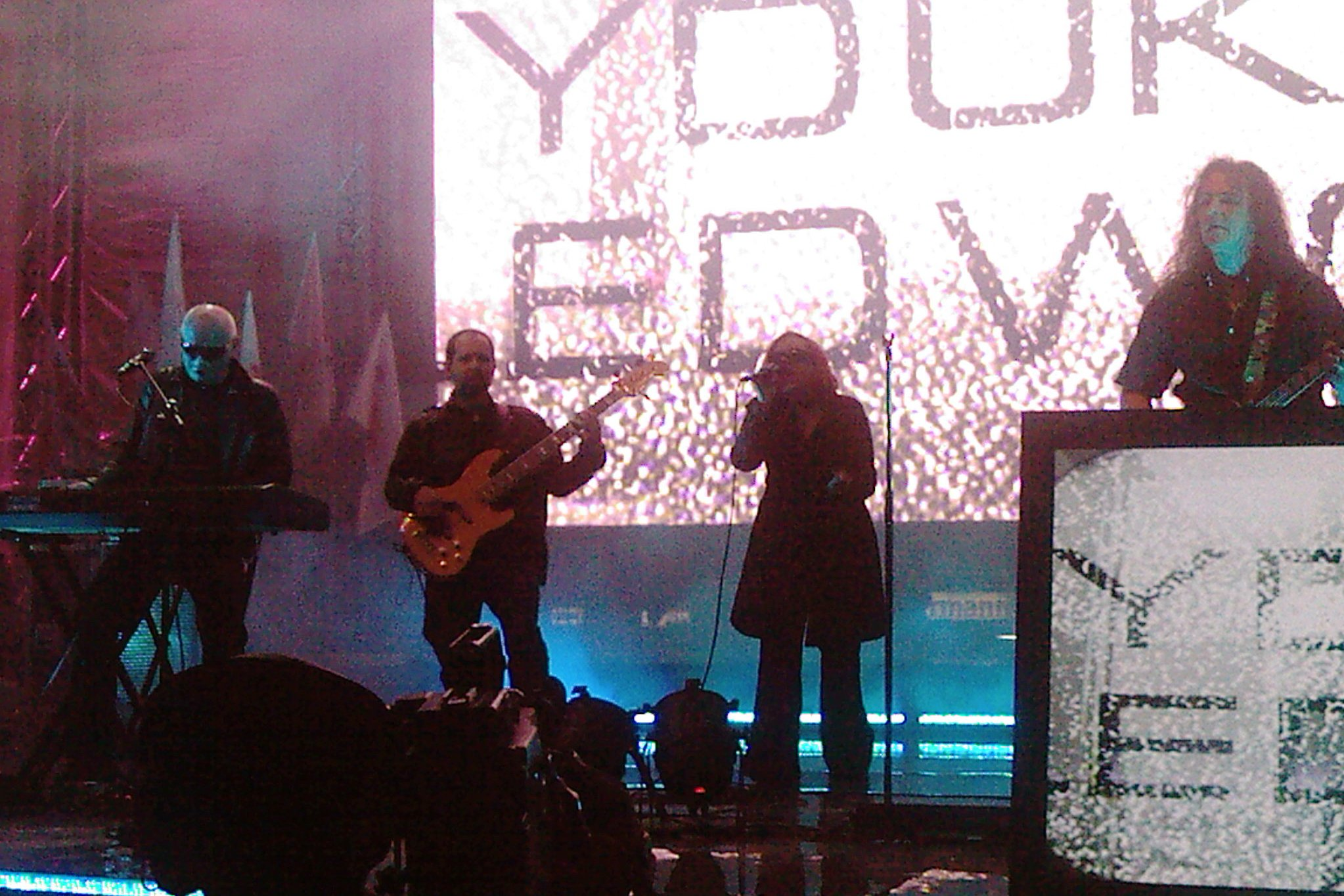
- Lombard live, 2010

Background information
- Origin: Poznań, Poland
- Genres: pop rock
- Years active: 1981–present
- Website: www.lombard.pl

Lombard is a Polish pop-rock band founded in 1981. The bandleader is Grzegorz Stróżniak – composer, arranger, and vocalist who also plays the keyboards. For over 35 years, he has given the band its original pop-rock character, combining expressive guitar sound with a full range of keyboards and electronics. In the first decade of its activity, Lombard cooperated with many instrumentalists and two vocalists: Wanda Kwietniewska and Małgorzata Ostrowska, who then decided to pursue their solo career. In 1999, Marta Cugier became the band’s lead singer. Over the years, Lombard has featured various line-ups, but the longest-standing members include Marta Cugier – vocal, Grzegorz Stróżniak – leader, vocal, keyboards, Daniel Patalas – guitar, Michał Kwapisz – bass, and Mirosław Kamiński – drums. The band has published several albums and still surprises its fans with a variety of its musical faces. The band boasts a number of well-known and well-liked hits, including the legendary “Przeżyj to sam” and “Szklana pogoda”, as well as the latest “Deja'vu – to już było” and “Musical”. In the 1980s, the band collaborated with external lyricists: Jacek Skubikowski, Marek Dutkiewicz, and Andrzej Sobczak. At present, the lyrics for the band are written by vocalist Marta Cugier. LOMBARD has played several thousand concerts in Poland and for Poles around the world.

== Band line-up ==
- Grzegorz Stróżniak: Keyboards, vocals, lead (1981–present)
- Marta Cugier: Vocals (1999–present)
- Daniel Patalas: Guitar (2007–present)
- Michał Kwapisz: Bass guitar (2006–present)
- Mirosław Kamiński: Drums (2006–present)

== Past members (vocalists) ==
- Wanda Kwietniewska: vocal (1981–1982)
- Małgorzata Ostrowska: vocal (1981–1991, 1997–1999)

== Discography ==
- Śmierć dyskotece (1983)
- Live (1983)
- Wolne od cła (1984)
- Szara maść (1984)
- Koncertowe przygody zespołu Lombard (1984)
- Hope and Penicillin (1985)
- Anatomia (1985)
- Wings of a Dove (1986)
- Live Hits 87 (1987)
- Kreacje (1987)
- The Very Best of Lombard Live (1989)
- Koncert (1989)
- Welcome Home (1990)
- '81-'91 Największe przeboje (1991)
- Największe przeboje 1981-1987 (1) (1994)
- Największe przeboje 1981-1987 (2) (1994)
- Ballady (1994)
- Afryka (1994)
- Gold (1996)
- Gold (1998)
- Deja'Vu (2000)
- 20 lat - koncert przeżyj to sam (2002)
- The Best - Przeżyj to sam (2004)
- Lombard - przebojowa kolekcja DZIENNIKA (2007)
- W hołdzie Solidarności - Drogi do wolności (2008)
- Show Time (2012)
- Lombard swing (2016)
