= Cleo (Polish singer) =

Polish singer

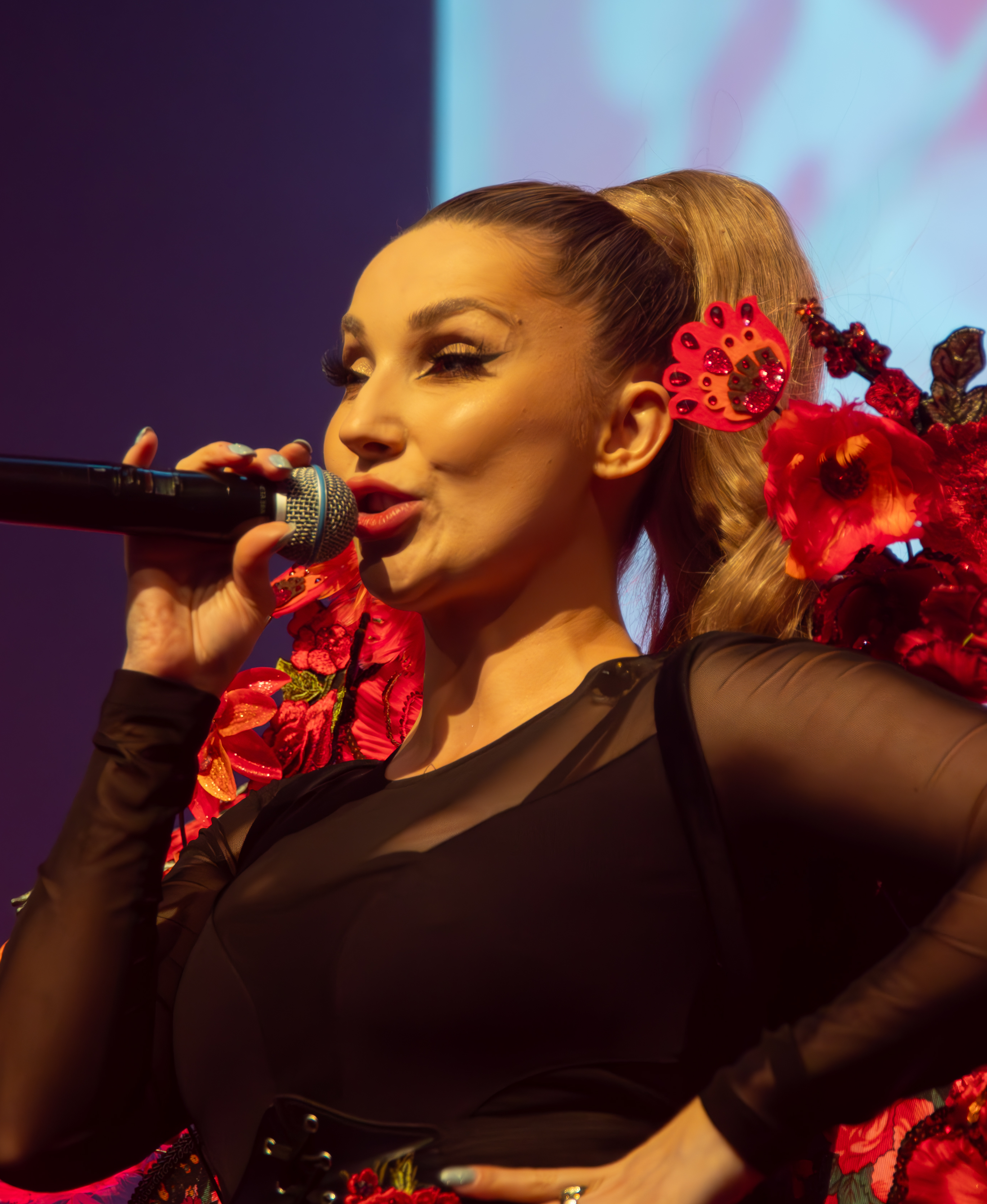
- Cleo in 2024

Background information
- Born: Joanna Krystyna Klepko; 25 June 1983 (age 43); Szczecin, Poland
- Genres: Hip hop; folk; pop
- Occupations: Singer; songwriter
- Years active: 2011–present
- Labels: Universal Music Polska, Urban Rec
- Website: cleo.media.pl

Donatan and Cleo presenting themselves and the song they are performing in the Eurovision Song Contest 2014. The clip is in Polish.

Joanna Krystyna Klepko (born 25 June 1983), known by her stage name Cleo, is a Polish singer. She represented Poland in the Eurovision Song Contest 2014 in Copenhagen, Denmark along with Donatan with the song "My Słowianie".

== Early life ==
Klepko was born in Szczecin. She has a twin brother named Piotr. She spent her childhood in Ursynów, Warsaw. She is a graduate of the Warsaw University of Life Sciences, where she obtained a master's degree in landscape architecture. During her time as a student, she lived in Paris for half a year.

== Career ==
Klepko sang in the gospel choir "Soul Connection". She won the first season of the Polish contest Studio Garaż in the category Rhythm and blues. She has worked among others with Pezet, Onar, Pih, Ramona 23, WSRH, Wet Fingers and Endefis.

In 2011, she took part in the first season of the Polish edition of the talent show X Factor. Since 2013, she has worked with Donatan.

On 25 February 2014, it was announced by TVP in the talk show Świat się kręci that Cleo, together with Donatan, with their song "My Słowianie", would represent Poland in the Eurovision Song Contest 2014 in Copenhagen, Denmark. They finished 14th in the final, scoring 62 points. This has caused controversy, as in the tele-vote result Poland was ranked 5th, with 162 points (top marks from the United Kingdom, Ireland, Norway and Ukraine). However, Poland did not receive any points from the UK and Ireland, despite being first in the public voting. This occurred as both the British and the Irish juries placed them last (25th). It was widely commented on by various media sites, such as The Independent, BBC News, The Telegraph, The Guardian and the Daily Mirror.

In 2015, Klepko took part in the fourth season of Taniec z Gwiazdami aired on Polsat, partnered with Jan Kliment. She was one of the favourites to win, but placed third out of eleven participants.

In December of that year, Cleo signed a record deal with Universal Music Poland, and released her first single "Zabiorę Nas" on 30 December.

On 13 May 2016, Cleo released the song "Wolę być" and "N-O-C" on 5 July. At the end of September, she was nominated for the MTV Europe Music Awards 2016 in the "Best Polish Artist" category. In December, the music video for the single "Na pół" was released.

On 26 May 2017, the re-release of her second album entitled Bastet, which included the release of a deluxe edition CD containing two new songs; "Pali się" and "Serce", along with instrumental versions of songs from the album. In June, Klepko confirmed in an interview for Plejada that she was working on material for her third studio album.

In October, the music video for the song "Pali się" was released. She also recorded the Christmas song "Coraz bliżej święta" for the advertising campaign of the Coca-Cola brand. On 27 November, an official music video for the song was released.

On 7 February 2018, the music video for the single "Łowcy gwiazd" was released, followed by the video for the song "EVA", which she recorded in a duet with Mesajah, on 6 June. On 18 June 2018, Klepko released the song "Łowcy", which was a new version of the single "Łowcy Gwiazd", which was recorded to support the Poland national football team in the World Cup.

In 2019, she released three singles; "Wrrra" and "Za Krokiem Krok" and "Kły". Since 2019, Cleo has been a coach on the children's singing competition show The Voice Kids.

On 6 March 2020, Cleo released the song "Alfabet Świateł", produced by Donatan. In May, she announced that she planned to release a new album entitled vinyLOVA on 18 March 2021, which would contain the song "Za krokiem krok". However, the release of the album was postponed due to the COVID-19 pandemic. On August 12, she released the song "Bratnie dusze", recorded with Dawid Kwiatkowski. More than a week before the premiere of her third album, she published the single "Znikam", which she recorded with B.R.O. On September 18, she released an album entitled superNOVA, which she promoted with the singles "Łowcy gwiazd", "EVA" and "Alfabet świateł". On October 28, she released the music video for the song "W telefonie" from the new album. Klepko has appeared in a number of advertisements for Media Expert, and in November 2020, it was announced that she had become the artistic director of the chain store. In December, the single "Number One" with Weronika Juszczak, was released.

On February 9, 2021, Klepko released the single "Kocham", for which she made a music video with the participation of several influencers. On 23 July, the song "Polskie Mexico", recorded with Lexy Chaplin, was released. The music video for the song would gain over 260,000 views in one hour on YouTube. On 22 October, the single "Dalej" with Maryla Rodowicz was released, with a music video also being made for the song.

== Discography ==
=== Studio albums ===
Album title	Album details	Peak chart positions	Certifications
Album title	Album details	POL	Certifications
Hiper/Chimera (with Donatan)	Released: 7 November 2014; Label: Urban Rec; Formats: CD, digital download	1	ZPAV: 3× Platinum
Bastet	Released: 2 September 2016; Label: Universal Music Polska; Formats: CD, digital download	3	ZPAV: Platinum
superNOVA	Released: 18 September 2020; Label: Universal Music Polska; Formats: CD, digital download	9	N/A
vinyLOVA	Released: 18 September 2021; Label: Universal Music Polska; Formats: CD, digital download	TBR	

=== Singles ===
Title	Year	Peak chart positions		Certifications	Album
Title	Year	POL	POL New	Certifications	Album
"My Słowianie" (with Donatan)	2013	2	2		Hiper/Chimera
"Cicha woda" (with Donatan featuring Sitek)	2014	11	1		Hiper/Chimera
"Slavica" (with Donatan)	2014	—	—		Hiper/Chimera
"Ten czas" (with Donatan featuring Kamil Bednarek)	2014	—	—		Hiper/Chimera
"Brać" (with Donatan featuring Enej)	2014	—	1		Hiper/Chimera
"Sztorm" (with Donatan)	2014	—	—		Hiper/Chimera
"Zabiorę nas"	2015	8	2	ZPAV: Diamond	Bastet
"Wolę być"	2016	34	1	ZPAV: Platinum	Bastet
"N-O-C"	2016	28	4	ZPAV: 3× Platinum	Bastet
"Na pół"	2016	35	2	ZPAV: Gold	Bastet
"Serce"	2017	—	—		Bastet
"Pali się" (featuring Sitek)	2017	—	—		Bastet
"Łowcy gwiazd"	2018	6	1	ZPAV: 3× Platinum	superNOVA
"Eva" (featuring Mesajah)	2018	—	—		superNOVA
"Film"	2018	54	2		superNOVA
"—" denotes single that did not chart or was not released.

=== Music videos ===
Year	Title	Directed	Album	Ref
2013	"My Słowianie" (with Donatan)	Piotr Smoleński	Hiper Chimera	
2014	"Cicha Woda" (with Donatan, featuring: Sitek)	Piotr Smoleński	Hiper Chimera	
2014	"Slavica" (with Donatan)	Piotr Smoleński	Hiper Chimera	
2014	"Brać" (with Donatan, featuring: Enej)	Piotr Smoleński	Hiper Chimera	
2014	"Sztorm" (with Donatan)	Piotr Smoleński	Hiper Chimera	
2015	"B.I.T." (with Donatan, featuring: Waldemar Kasta)	Piotr Smoleński	Hiper Chimera	
2015	"Zabiorę nas"	Piotr Smoleński	Bastet	
2016	"Zabiorę Nas" (Basto remix)	Joshua Grospeck	Bastet	
2016	"Wolę być"	Michał Konrad, Piotr Smoleński	Bastet	
2016	"N-O-C"	Michał Konrad, Piotr Smoleński	Bastet	
2016	"Mi-Sie"	Recorded by phone	Bastet	
2016	"Na pół"	Michał Konrad, Piotr Smoleński	Bastet	
2017	"PALI SIĘ" (featuring: Sitek)	Michał Konrad	Bastet	
2018	"Łowcy Gwiazd"	Michał Konrad	superNOVA	
2018	"EVA" (featuring: Mesajah)	Michał Konrad	superNOVA	
2018	"Film"	Michał Konrad	superNOVA	
2019	"WRRRA"	Michał Konrad		
2019	"Za Krokiem Krok"	Michał Konrad	vinyLOVA	
2019	"KŁY" (with Don&RL9, featuring: donGURALesko)	Michał Konrad	STAMINA (album Don&RL9)	
2019	"DOM"	Michał Konrad	STAMINA (album Don&RL9)	
2020	"Alfabet Świateł"	Michał Konrad	superNOVA	
2020	"W Telefonie"	Michał Konrad	superNOVA	
2020	"Bratnie Dusze" (featuring: Dawid Kwiatkowski)	Michał Konrad	vinyLOVA	
2021	"KOCHAM"	Michał Konrad	vinyLOVA	
2021	"Number One" (featuring: Weronika Juszczak)	Roman Przylipiak	vinyLOVA	
2021	"POLSKIE MEXICO" (featuring: Lexy Chaplin)	Michał Konrad		
2021	"DALEJ / NEONY" (featuring: Maryla Rodowicz)	Michał Konrad	vinyLOVA	
2022	"MNIEJ ZNACZY WIĘCEJ" (song for the movie "Detektyw Bruno")	Michał Konrad	vinyLOVA	
2022	"ŻYWIOŁY"	Michał Konrad	vinyLOVA	

== Filmography ==
Film and television
Year	Title	Role	Notes
2011	X Factor	Contestant	Talent competition
2014	Eurovision Song Contest 2014	Contestant	Television show
2015	Dancing with the Stars: Taniec z gwiazdami	Contestant	Television show
2019–	The Voice Kids	Judge	Talent competition

Awards and achievements
Preceded by Magdalena Tul with "Jestem"	Poland in the Eurovision Song Contest; 2014 (with Donatan)	Succeeded by Monika Kuszyńska with "In the Name of Love"
