= Kasia Popowska =

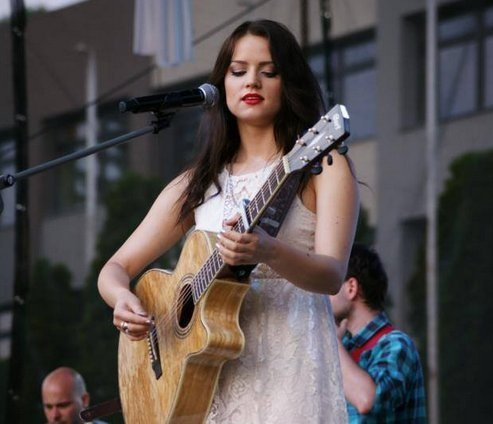
- Popowska in 2015

Background information
- Born: Katarzyna Popowska; 25 November 1989 (age 36)
- Origin: Łódź, Poland
- Genres: Pop
- Occupation: Singer
- Instruments: vocals, guitar, piano
- Years active: 2007– present
- Label: Universal Music Poland
- Website: kasiapopowska.com

Katarzyna Milena Popowska (born 25 November 1989, Łódź) also known as Kasia Popowska and PoppySinger is a Polish singer and a self-taught guitarist. Her debut album titled Tlen was released on 16 September 2014.

== Career ==
=== Early years ===
Since 31 May 2007 she has uploaded videos of her performances on YouTube which attracted over 7,000,000 viewers. She has recorded cover versions of such popular hits like "Angels" by Robbie Williams, "Baby Love" by Nicole Scherzinger, "The Climb" by Miley Cyrus, Rihanna's "Take A Bow" and many others.

=== 2009-2010: Poland's Got Talent and debut album plans ===
In 2009 she auditioned for the second series of Polish version of hit television show called Mam talent!. In front of the judges she sang "Hallelujah" by Leonard Cohen. Despite receiving positive judges' comments and public reaction, she failed to get through to the live semi-finals. This caused many protests of viewers who wanted Kasia to return to the competition. However, all of them were ineffective.

In late 2009 Popowska announced in one of her YouTube videos that she had signed a record deal with a label and was going to start working on her debut album. Then, it was reported that she was signed by Amfibia Records. The album, which title is unknown yet, is set to be released in 2011.

On July 24, 2010, Popowska performed on the XXIX Festiwal Piknik Country Mrągowo 2010. She sang the Dolly Parton hit, "Jolene".

=== 2014-present: debut album ===
Popowska's debut album titled Tlen is set to be released on 16 September 2014 under Universal Music Poland label. It will be promoted by already released single "Przyjdzie taki dzień" and "Tlen", which is yet to be released as the second single.

== Filmography ==
- 2010: Tangled (Polish version), as Rapunzel (singing only)

== Discography ==
=== Albums ===
Title	Peak chart positions	
Title	POL	
Tlen	Released: 16 September 2014; Label: Universal Music Poland; Format: CD, LP, digital download	47
Dryfy	Released: 20 January 2017; Label: Universal Music Poland; Format: CD, digital download	–
Toast	Released: 27 November 2020; Label:GT Event; Format: CD, digital download	–

=== Singles ===
Title	Peak chart positions	Album	
Title	POL	Album	
"Przyjdzie taki dzień"	2014	1	Tlen
"Tlen"	2014	–	Tlen
"Lecę tam"	2015	7	Tlen
"Graj"	2016	26	Tlen – kolor i maj
"Dryfy"	2016	10	Dryfy
"Tyle tu mam"	2017	36	Dryfy
"Nie ma nas"	2020	–	Toast
"Nim potłuczemy szkło"	2020	–	Toast
"Powiedz gdzie"	2020	–	Toast

=== Guest appearances ===
- 2009: unofficial "Best Covers" was made by fanclub kasiapopowska.socjum.pl
- 2011: CD SoundTrack "Zaplątani" (eng.Tangled), six songs as Roszpunka (eng.Rapunzel)
- 2011: "POLAND...WHY NOT?", "It was You" (written by Kasia Popowska, Brian Allan and Jan Weckström)
