= Eddy Wata =

Nigerian eurodance music artist

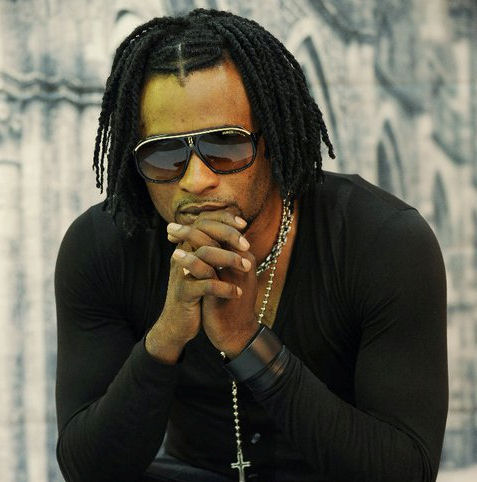

Background information
- Born: March 3, 1976 (age 49); Kaduna, Nigeria
- Genres: Eurodance
- Occupation: Singer
- Years active: 2001–present

Eddy Wata (born 3 March 1976) is a Nigerian Eurodance artist. He is most popular with his dance tunes "I Love My People", "My Dream" and "Jam".

== Biography ==
Eddy Wata was born in Benin City, Edo State Nigeria and began to play with a battery-operated keyboard at a very young age. He listened to Jamaican artists which contributed to his love of reggae.

in Nigeria, he formed a band, and following many television appearances, he toured Europe in 2001. In the Netherlands, he was acquainted with the manager Lino Longoni and in 2003, after being placed under contract by the Italian producer Diego Milesi became popular star in European dance scene.

His singles included the 2003 hit "Jam", followed by "In Your Mind" and "The Bomb". But it was with his 2008 international hit "I Love My People" that he reached the top of dance charts in many countries. He followed it up with "The Light" and in 2009 "My Dream" and "I Like the Way" in 2010 and "Senorita" in 2011.

== Singles ==
Charting singles

Year	Single	Charts						Certification
Year	Single	BEL (Wa)	DEN	FIN	FRA	POL	ROM	Certification
2003/ 2004	"Jam"	36	—	—	16	—	—	—
2004	"In Your Mind"	—	—	—	34	—	—	—
2005	"La Bomba"	—	19	10	59	—	—	—
2008	"I Love My People"	—	—	—	—	4	1	—

Other songs

- 2004: "Asperger"
- 2006: "What a Boy"
- 2008: "The Light"
- 2009: "My Dream"
- 2010: "I Like the Way"
- 2010: "I Wanna Dance"
- 2011: "Señorita"
- 2012: "Superstar"
- 2013: "I Feel So Good"
- 2013: "My Season"
- 2014: "I Wa le Wa"
- 2015: "Shake Your Bom Bom"

featured in

- 2004: "A Silvia" (Gabry Ponte feat. Eddy Wata) in Gabry Ponte album Dr. Jekyll and Mr. DJ
- 2004: "Bring Me to Life" (Mixtery feat. Eddy Wata) (sampling on Evanescence song)
