= Natalia Szroeder =

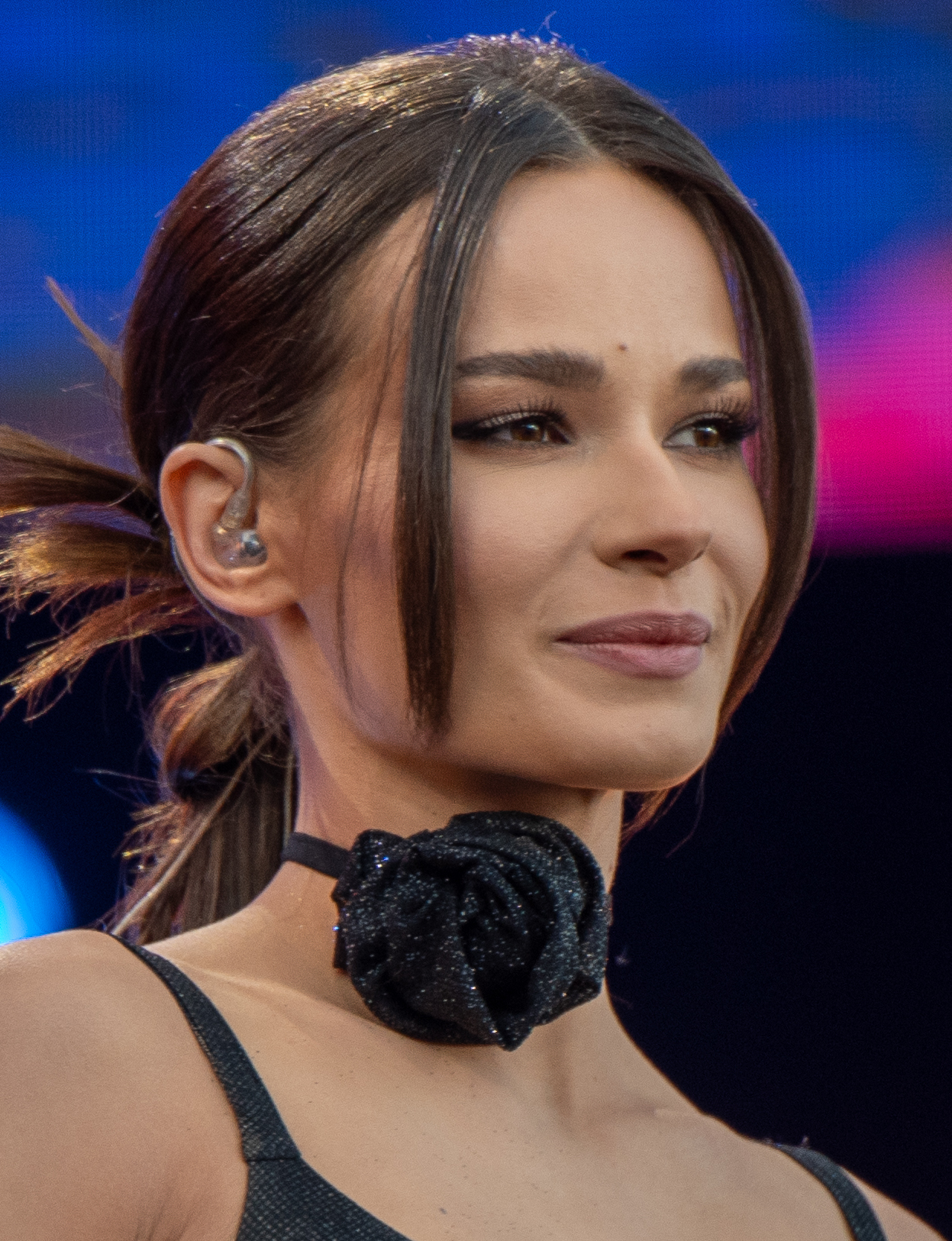
- Szroeder in 2023

Background information
- Born: 20 April 1995 (age 31); Bytów, Poland
- Genres: Pop
- Occupations: Singer, author, TV presenter
- Years active: 2011–present
- Label: Warner Music Poland

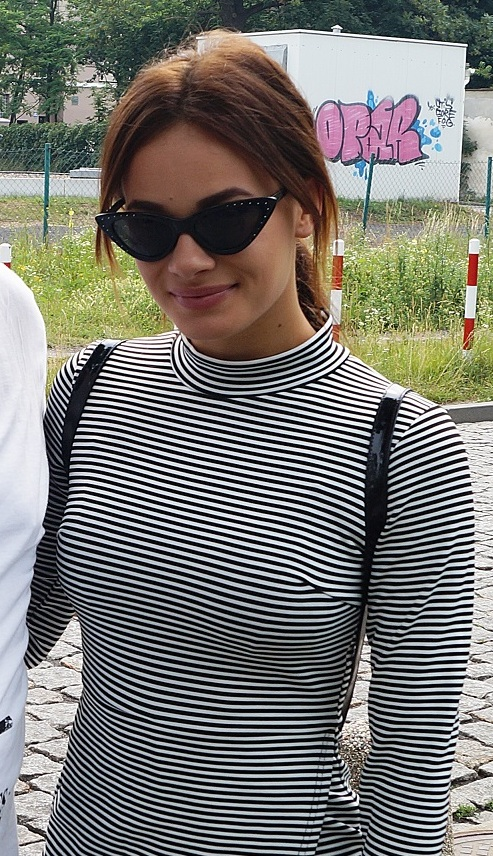
Natalia Szroeder (2018)

Natalia Weronika Szroeder (born 20 April 1995) is a Polish singer-songwriter and TV presenter. She is most known for her works with rapper Liber, of which she appeared with in his songs Wszystkiego na raz and Nie patrzę w dół in 2013. The singer also has a solo career: her debut single titled "Jane" was released in 2012.

== Biography ==
Szroeder was born on 20 April 1995 in Bytów. She grew up in the Pomeranian village of Parchowo in a musically inclined family. Her mother, Joanna, is a singer for the folk band Modraki, which was founded by her grandfather Waldemar Kapiszka. Three of her siblings were part of the Rusland Trio. Her father Jaromir was the founder of the Dialogus theater, in 2004/2005. In childhood, Szroeder appeared in the TVP1 program, Od przedszkola do Opola.

In 2011, she was a part of an episode of Szansa na sukces. She sang the song "Cicha woda" by Maryla Rodowicz. On 24 March 2012, she released a video on YouTube for the song "Potrzebny je drech" (in the Kashubian language), of which she wrote Weronika Korthals, as advised by Tomasz Fopke. In July of that year, she released their debut single "Jane". The music and the lyrics were written by Marek Kościkiewicz, a former member of De Mono. In the same year, she teamed up with rapper Liber, with whom she recorded the song "Wszystkiego na raz". The composition was ranked 5th in AirPlay – Top, and also hit the charts of radio stations such as RMF FM and Radio ZET. The song "Wszystkiego na raz" was the second single released in May of the same year in the Liber album Duety. The album also shared the second track of the two, "Nie patrzę w dół", whose music video was produced by Cam-L Studio DL Promotion. On 3 August of that year, Szroeder performed a duet with Liber at the Eska Music Awards 2013 gala, during which they were nominated for Best Debut. In the same month, Szroeder appeared on the Russian Song Festival in Zielona Góra, where she performed the song "Kukuszka" from the repertoire of Zemfira. On 2 December 2013, she released her second hit single, "Tęczowy".

On 11 February 2014, she released her third single "Nie pytaj jak" ("Young Stars Festival"). In April, she appeared alongside Mezo and Dawid Kwiatkowski at the Young Stars Festival 2014, at the HWS Arena in Poznań. In June of that year, she took part in a concert to celebrate the 25th anniversary of the careers of Jacek Cygan and Ryszard Rynkowski, which took place in the framework of LI Festival of Polish Songs in Opole. During the concert, she sang the song "Za młodzi, za starzy", in a duet with Cygan. In June, she took part in Carpathia Festival 2014, organized in Rzeszów. On 27 July 2014, during a concert at Lato ZET i Dwójki in Toruń, together with Liber, she won in the category of Best Performance for the performance of the song Nie patrzę w dół. In the same year, on 24 August, they released their first single, Teraz ty, which heralds the two as a duo.

Performances of Natalia Szroeder in Twoja twarz brzmi znajomo
Episode	Performed Song/Original Artist	Points					Total points	Place
Episode	Performed Song/Original Artist	Paweł Królikowski	Katarzyna Skrzynecka	DJ Adamus	Małgorzata Walewska	Bonus (points awarded by the other participants)	Total points	Place
1.	"Could You Be Loved"/Bob Marley	6	2	1	3	5	17	6th
2.	"Granda"/Monika Brodka	2	1	2	1	10	16	6th
3.	"Poker Face"/Lady Gaga	7	6	10	6	10	39	2nd
4.	"Nasz Disneyland"/Paweł Stasiak	2	1	5	1	10	19	5th
5.	"I Have Nothing"/Whitney Houston	10	10	10	10	10	50	1st
6.	"Without Me"/Eminem	2	5	3	2	5	17	6th
7.	"Shake It Off"/Taylor Swift	3	2	5	2	0	12	7th
8.	"Anna Maria"/Seweryn Krajewski	2	1	2	4	5	14	8th
9.	"Paranoid"/Ozzy Osbourne	2	3	10	6	5	26	3rd
10. (final)	"Dumka na dwa serca"/Edyta Górniak a duet with Michał Grobelny, who plays the role of Mietek Szcześniak	–	–	–	–	–	–	–

On 9 February 2016, Szroeder confirmed on the radio show RMF FM that she would attempt to represent Poland via a national final for the 61st edition of the Eurovision Song Contest in 2016 with the song "Lustra". She had been a jury member for Poland in the Eurovision Song Contest 2015. A few days later, she was on the list of artists qualified for the final. She got 5th place with 4.20% of the votes. In August 2016, she released her second single "Domek z kart" for her debut album NATinterpretacje. Szroeder is a co-author of lyrics and music from the album. The album debuted at the 15th place of the Polish OLiS charts.

From 3 March to 12 May 2017, she took part in the seventh edition of the Polish version of Dancing with the Stars, Dancing with the Stars: Taniec z gwiazdami with her dance partner Jan Kliment. The couple won the competition, beating Cichosz and Stefano Terrazzino in the finals. Along with Rafał Brzozowski and Sylwia Lipka, she was an interval act for the national selection for the Polish national final for the Junior Eurovision Song Contest 2017.

In January 2018, in an interview with Plejada.pl, she confirmed the beginning of work on a second studio album, which she planned to premiere in autumn of 2018.

In January 2020, the premiere of the movie Jak zostałem gangsterem: Historia prawdziwa, took part in which she played Magda, the wife of the main character. She was the host of a TV program of the talent show broadcast on Polsat The Four: Bitwa o sławę.

In March 2025, the premiere of the movie

Jak zostałam gangsterem. Historia Prawdziwa took part in which she played Magda the hosf of a Tv program of the talent Show broadcast Polsat Must Be Music

== Inspirations ==
Among her inspirations, Szroeder mentions above all Michael Jackson. She is also inspired by the music of artists such as Justin Timberlake and Rihanna.

== Discography ==
=== Singles ===
List of singles as lead artist, with selected chart positions and certifications, showing year released and album name
Title	Year	Peak chart positions		Certifications	Album
Title	Year	POL	POL (New)	Certifications	Album
"Jane"	2012	—	2		—
"Tęczowy"	2013	—	1		—
"Wszystkiego na raz" (with Liber)	2013	5	1		Duety
"Teraz Ty" (with Liber)	2014	4	1		—
"Porównania" (with Liber)	2015	—	4		—
"Samosiejka"	2015	—	—		—
"Lustra"	2016	6	1	POL: 2× Platinum	Natinterpretacje
"Domek z Kart"	2016	19	3	POL: Gold	Natinterpretacje
"Powietrze"	2016	9	2	POL: Platinum	Natinterpretacje
"Zamienię Cię"	2017	4	1	POL: Platinum	Natinterpretacje
"Zaprowadź Mnie"	2017	26	3		Tarapaty (movie soundtrack)
"Parasole"	2018	42	3	POL: Platinum	—
"Nie oglądam się"	2019	26	1		—
"Nie mów nic"	2019	—	—		—
"—" denotes items which were not released in that country or failed to chart.

=== As featured artist ===
Title	Year	Peak on charts		Albums
Title	Year	POL (airplay)	RMF	Albums
Liber – "Nie patrzę w dół" (feat. Natalia Szroeder)	2013	2	3	Duety
"—" denotes items which were not released in that country or failed to chart.

Album	Year	Title
Weronika Korthals – Na wiedno	2009	"Redosny dzéń" (feat. Natalia Szroeder)
Najpiękniejsze polskie kolędy (kompilacja)	2010	Weronika Korthals i Natalia Szroeder – "Dzysô z Betlejem"
Liber – Duety	2013	"Wszystkiego na raz" (feat. Natalia Szroeder) "Nie patrzę w dół" (feat. Natalia Szroeder)
TARTA z truskawkami kaszubskimi (kompilacja)	2014	Natalia Szroeder – "Potrzebny je drech"

== Videos ==
Title	Years	Directors	Albums	References
"Potrzebny je drech"	2012	–	–	
"Jane"	2012	–	–	
"Tęczowy"	2013	–	–	
"Nie pytaj jak (Young Stars Festival)"	2014	Smoła Studio	–	
"Teraz ty" (feat. Liber)	2014	Adam Gawenda	–	
Featuring
Liber – "Wszystkiego na raz" (feat. Natalia Szroeder)	2013	–	Duety	
Liber – "Nie patrzę w dół" (feat. Natalia Szroeder)	2013	cam-L Studio, DL Promotion	Duety	
Other
Weronika Korthals and Natalia Szroeder – "Dzysô z Betlejem"	2010	–	Najpiękniejsze polskie kolędy	

== Awards and honors ==
Year	Category	Award	Note	Source
2013	The best debut	Eska Music Awards 2013	Nominated	
2013	The biggest hit of the year ("Wszystkiego na raz")	TOPtrendy 2013	Nominated	
2016	Grand Prix Opola 2016 ("Lustra")	National Festival of Polish Song in Opole	Nominated	
