= Kazik na Żywo =

Polish rapcore band

Kazik Na Żywo
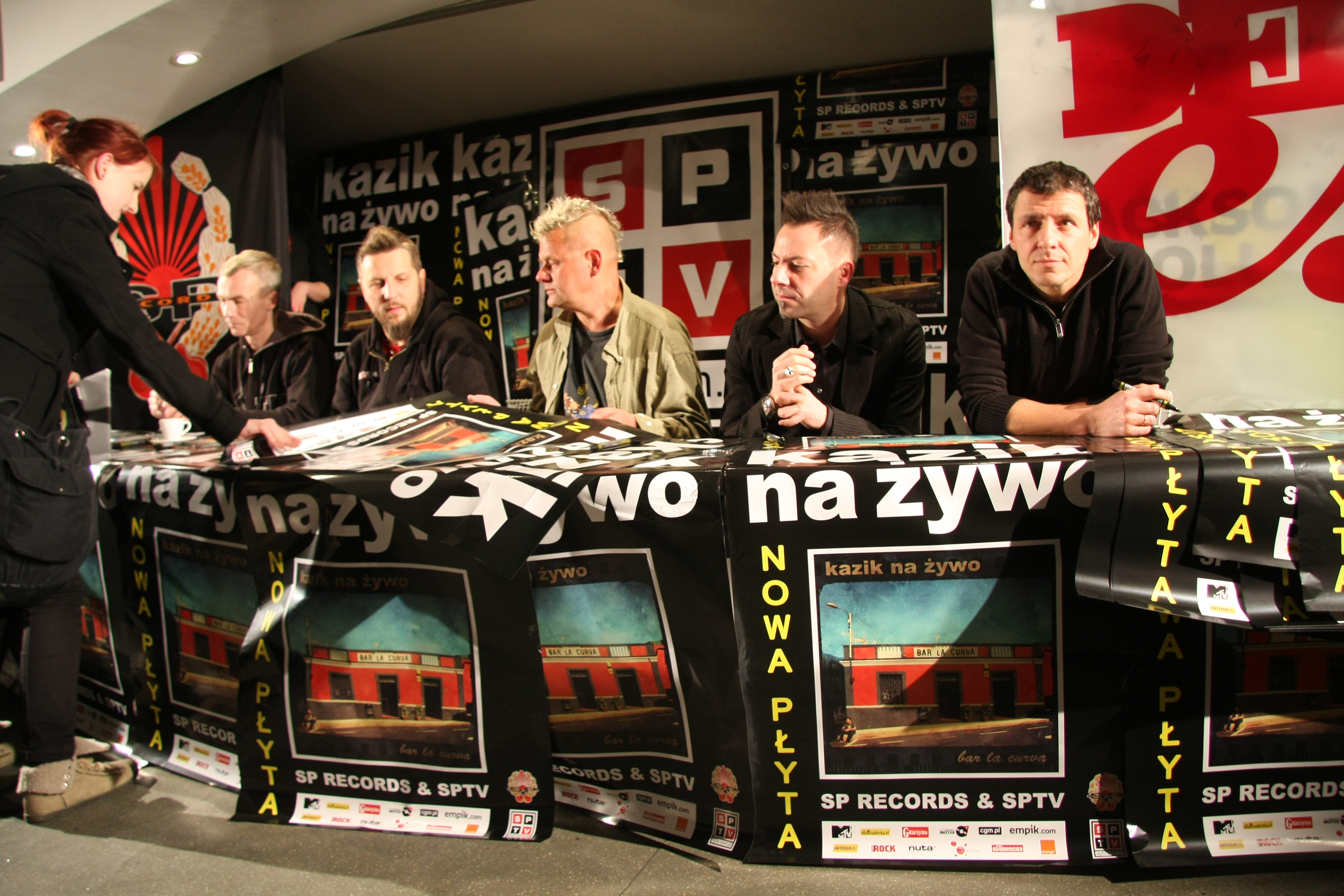
- Kazik Na Żywo signing autographs, 5 December 2011 in Warszawa

Background information
- Also known as: Kaenżet
- Origin: Warsaw, Poland
- Genres: Alternative metal, rapcore, rap metal
- Years active: 1991–2004, 2009–2015
- Labels: S.P. Records
- Members: Adam "Burza" Burzyński; Tomasz Goehs; Robert "Litza" Friedrich; Kazik Staszewski; Michał "Kwiatek" Kwiatkowski
- Past members: Olaf Deriglasoff; Kuba Jabłoński
- Website: knz.art.pl (in Polish)

Kazik Na Żywo ("Kazik Live", also known as KNŻ and Kaenżet) was a Polish rapcore band formed in 1991, in Warsaw.

== History ==
Their first performance was during the music festival in Sopot, Poland, in 1992. Staszewski then shocked the audience, singing the song 100 000 000, which was based on Lech Wałęsa's presidential campaign unfulfilled promise that all Poles would be given 100 million złoty. In chorus, Staszewski repeats: Wałęsa, give me my 100 million, Wałęsa, give us our 100 million.

After the recording of Na żywo, ale w studio in 1994, Jabłoński was replaced by Tomasz Goehs. A few months later the guitarist Robert "Litza" Friedrich was added. After quitting the band, Robert Friedrich was replaced by Olaf Deriglasoff.

The band gave the last concert on 25 January 2004 in Gdańsk. Following a long break, the band announced its return. First concerts are scheduled for mid and late February 2009 in Toruń and Wrocław, with the lineup Staszewski (vocals), Burzyński (guitar), Kwiatkowski (bass guitar), Friedrich (guitar) and Goehs (drums).

== Band members ==
=== Current members ===
- Adam Burzyński - guitar
- Robert Friedrich - guitar, vocal (1994–2000, 2009–2015)
- Tomasz Goehs - drums, vocal (1994–2004, 2009–2015)
- Michał Kwiatkowski - bass, guitar
- Kazik Staszewski - vocal, guitar

=== Former members ===
- Olaf Deriglasoff - guitar, sampler (2000–2004)
- Kuba Jabłoński - drums (1992–1994)

== Discography ==
=== Studio albums ===
Title	Album details	Peak chart positions	Sales	Certifications
Title	Album details	POL	Sales	Certifications
Na żywo, ale w studio	Released: 4 April 1994; Label: S.P. Records; Formats: CD, digital download	—		
Porozumienie ponad podziałami	Released: 25 September 1995; Label: S.P. Records; Formats: CD, digital download	36		
Las Maquinas de la Muerte	Released: 12 April 1999; Label: S.P. Records; Formats: CD	—		
Bar La Curva / Plamy na słońcu	Released: 28 November 2011; Label: S.P. Records; Formats: CD, digital download	1	POL: 30,000+	POL: Platinum
"—" denotes a recording that did not chart or was not released in that territory.

=== Live albums ===
Title	Album details	Peak chart positions
Title	Album details	POL
Występ	Released: 21 September 2002; Label: S.P. Records; Formats: CD, digital download	1
"—" denotes a recording that did not chart or was not released in that territory.
