= Mesajah =

Polish reggae singer and songwriter

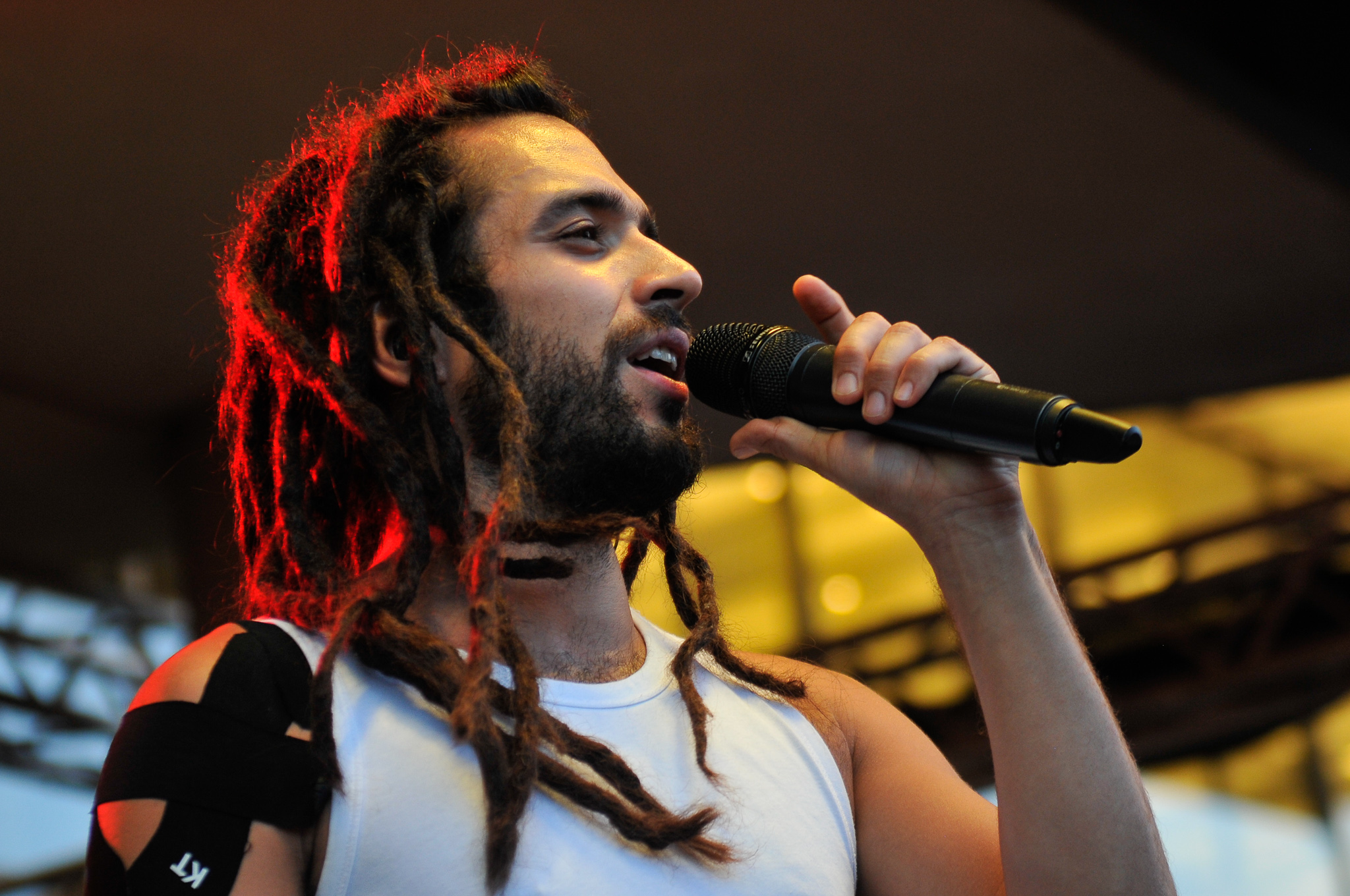
- Mesajah in 2017

Background information
- Born: Manuel Rengifo Diaz; 26 November 1985 (age 40); Wrocław, Poland
- Genres: Reggae, dancehall
- Occupation: Singer-songwriter
- Instrument: Vocals
- Years active: 2003–present
- Labels: Popular Station Studio, Pink Crow Records, Lion Stage Management, Urban Rec, Lou & Rocked Boys

Manuel Rengifo Diaz (born 26 November 1985), better known as Mesajah, is a Polish reggae singer and songwriter.

== Career ==
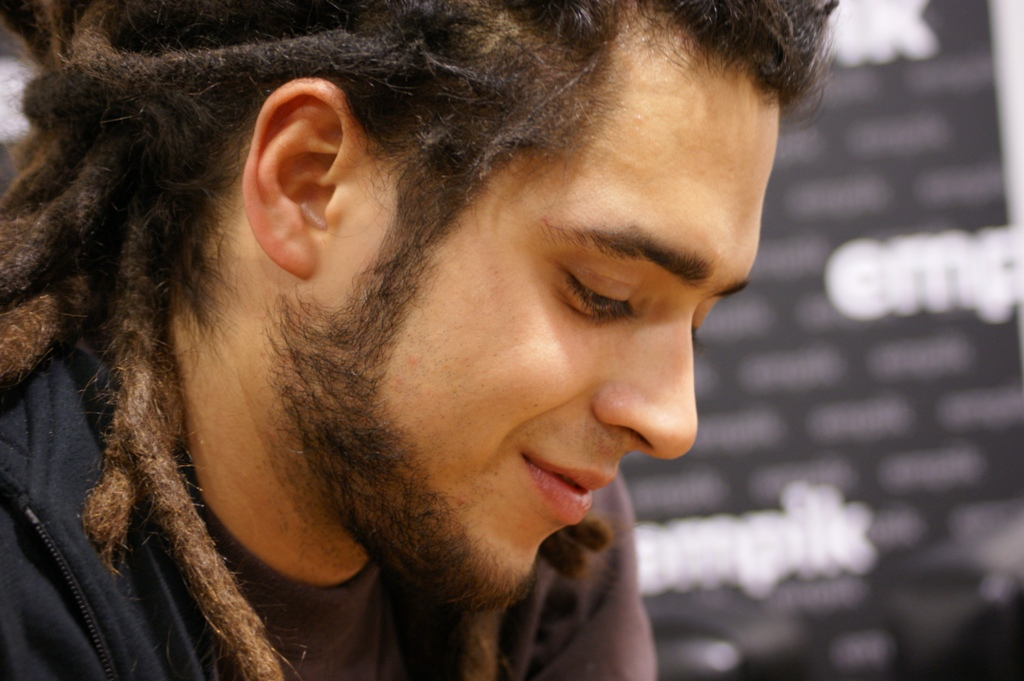
Mesajah in 2008

He was born and raised in Wrocław, Poland. His father comes from Peru, and his mother is Polish.

His musical career began in the Polish reggae band Natural Dread Killaz, which he founded with his brother Paxon and friend Yanaz. In 2008 he decided to try a solo career. His first album, called Ludzie prości, was released in September 2008. From this album comes his most popular song called Każdego dnia. The music video for this song has 22 million views on YouTube and is one of the most viewed videos of Mesajah. His second album Jestem stąd was released 15 February 2012. His third album, Brudna prawda, was released 7 June 2013. In 2016 he has released fourth album, Powrót do korzeni.

The lyrics of Mesajah's songs are sometimes critical and sometimes positive opinions about world and human relations.

== Discography ==
=== Albums ===
- 2008: Ludzie prości, label: Pink Crow Records
- 2012: Jestem stąd, label: Lion Stage Management
- 2013: Brudna prawda, label: Urban Rec
- 2016: Powrót do korzeni, label: Lou & Rocked Boys
