= Donatan =

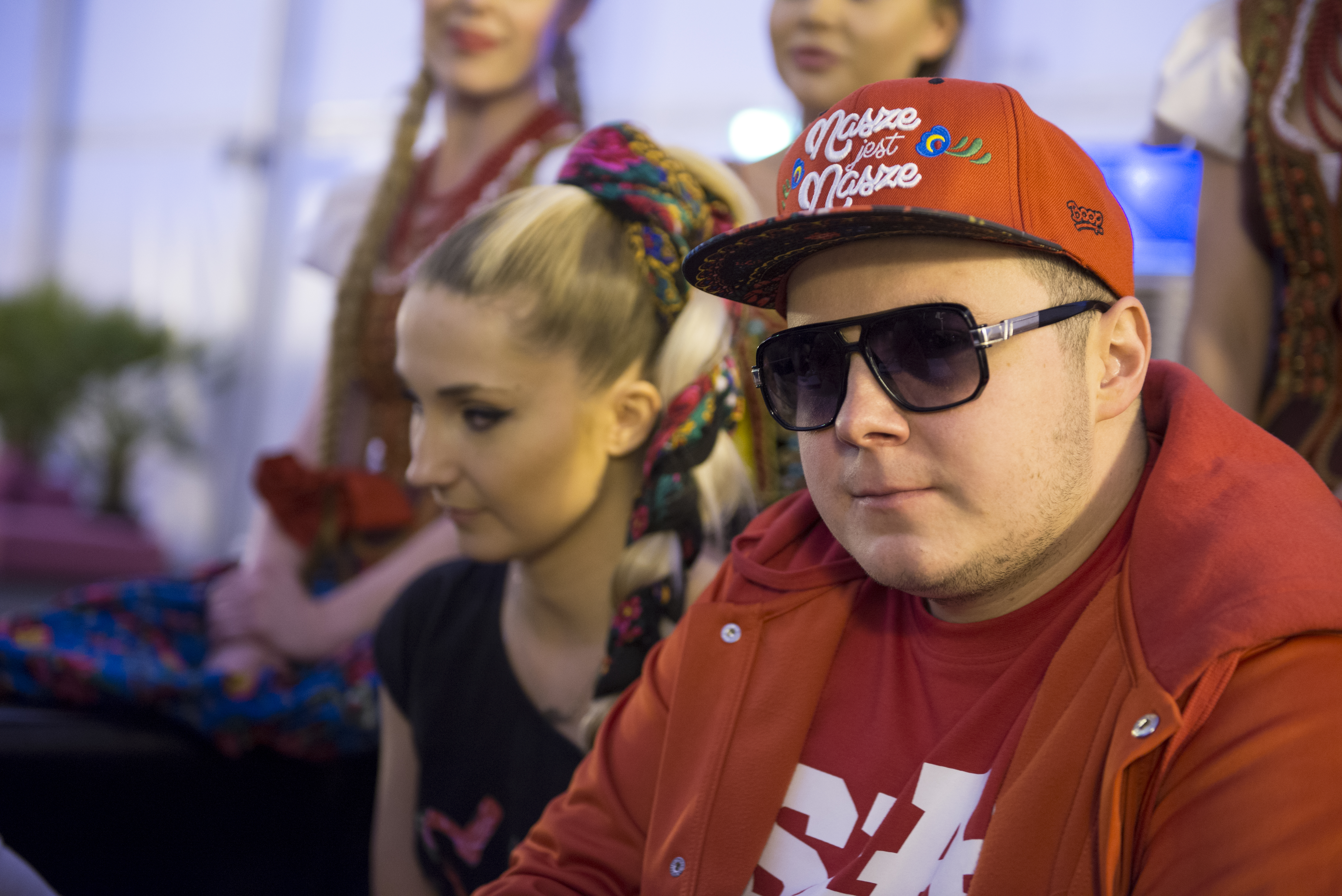
- Donatan (right) with Cleo (2014)

Background information
- Born: Witold Czamara; 2 September 1984 (age 42); Kraków, Poland
- Origin: Poland
- Genres: Hip hop music, folk music
- Occupations: Musician, music producer and sound engineer
- Instrument: Keyboard
- Years active: 2002–present
- Label: Urban Rec

Witold Marek Czamara (born 2 September 1984 in Kraków), better known by his stage name Donatan, is a Polish musician, music producer and sound engineer. Donatan along with Teka co-created RafPak.

== Life and career ==
Donatan was born to a Russian mother and Polish father. He began producing music in 2002, with his debut album "Brudne południe", released in 2007. For eight years Donatan lived in Taganrog, Rostov Oblast, Russia, and has been married since 2004. Donatan is a self-declared adherent of Slavic Native Faith and has often been criticized for allegedly preaching pan-Slavism, paganism, satanism, recommending the Red Army, and promoting communist symbols including the hammer and sickle.

In 2013, he has been nominated for Best Polish Act at MTV Europe Music Awards alongside Cleo.

In 2014, it was announced by the Polish broadcaster, Telewizja Polska (TVP) that Donatan along with Cleo would represent Poland in the Eurovision Song Contest 2014, in Copenhagen, Denmark, with the song "My Słowianie".

== Discography ==
=== Albums ===
Album title	Album details	Peak chart positions	Certifications
Album title	Album details	POL	Certifications
Równonoc. Słowiańska dusza	Released: 26 October 2012; Label: Urban Rec; Format: CD, digital download	1	ZPAV: Diamond
Hiper Chimera (with Cleo)	Released: 7 November 2014; Label: Urban Rec; Formats: CD, digital download	1	ZPAV: 2× Platinum

=== Singles ===
Title	Year	Peak chart positions		Album
Title	Year	POL	POL New	Album
"Nie lubimy robić" (featuring: Borixon & Kajman)	2012	—	1	Równonoc. Słowiańska dusza
"Niespokojna dusza" (featuring: Chada, Słoń & Sobota)	2012	—	—	Równonoc. Słowiańska dusza
"Z dziada-pradziada" (featuring: Trzeci Wymiar)	2012	—	—	Równonoc. Słowiańska dusza
"Z samym sobą" (featuring: Sokół)	2012	—	—	Równonoc. Słowiańska dusza
"Nie lubimy robić (Remixy)"	2013	—	—	non-album single
"My Słowianie" (with Cleo)	2013	2	2	Hiper Chimera
"Cicha woda" (with Cleo featuring: Sitek)	2014	11	1	Hiper Chimera
"Slavic Girls" (with Cleo)	2014	—	—	non-album single
"Slavica" (with Cleo)	2014	—	—	Hiper Chimera
"My Słowianie Remixes" (with Cleo)	2014	—	—	non-album single
"Slavic Girls Remixes" (with Cleo)	2014	—	—	non-album single
"Ten czas" (with Cleo featuring: Kamil Bednarek)	2014	—	—	Hiper Chimera
"Brać" (with Cleo featuring: Enej)	2014	—	1	Hiper Chimera
"Pełnia" (with Maryla Rodowicz)	2015	19	3	non-album single
"—" denotes single that did not chart or was not released.

=== Music videos ===
Year	Title	Directed	Album	Ref
2012	"Z dziada-pradziada" (featuring: Trzeci Wymiar)	Piotr Tutka	Równonoc. Słowiańska dusza	
2012	"Niespokojna dusza" (featuring: Chada, Słoń, Sobota)	Piotr Tutka	Równonoc. Słowiańska dusza	
2012	"Nie lubimy robić" (featuring: Borixon, Kajman)	Piotr Smoleński, Piotr Tutka	Równonoc. Słowiańska dusza	
2012	"Słowiańska krew" (featuring: DonGuralesko, Kaczor, Shellerini, Rafi, Ry23)	Piotr Smoleński	Równonoc. Słowiańska dusza	
2012	"Z samym sobą" (featuring: Sokół)	Piotr Smoleński	Równonoc. Słowiańska dusza	
2012	"Budź się" (featuring: DonGuralesko, Pezet, Pih)	Piotr Smoleński	Równonoc. Słowiańska dusza	
2012	"Szukaj jej tu" (featuring: Paluch)	UrbanCity, SSG	Równonoc. Słowiańska dusza	
2012	"Noc Kupały" (featuring: Tede)	Piotr Smoleński	Równonoc. Słowiańska dusza	
2013	"Nie lubimy robić" (101 Decybeli Remix; featuring: Borixon, Kajman)	Dariusz Szermanowicz, Łukasz Tunikowski, Grupa 13	Nie lubimy robić (Remixy)	
2013	"My Słowianie" (with Cleo)	Piotr Smoleński	Hiper Chimera	
2014	"Cicha woda" (with Cleo, featuring: Sitek)	Piotr Smoleński	Hiper Chimera	
2014	"Slavica" (with Cleo)	Piotr Smoleński	Hiper Chimera	
2014	"Brać" (with Cleo, featuring: Enej)	Piotr Smoleński	Hiper Chimera	
2014	"Sztorm"	Piotr Smoleński	Hiper Chimera	

== See also ==
- Poland in the Eurovision Song Contest 2014

Awards and achievements
Preceded by Magdalena Tul with "Jestem"	Poland in the Eurovision Song Contest; 2014 (with Cleo)	Succeeded by Monika Kuszyńska with "In the Name of Love"
