= MozART group =

Polish cabaret and comedy string quartet

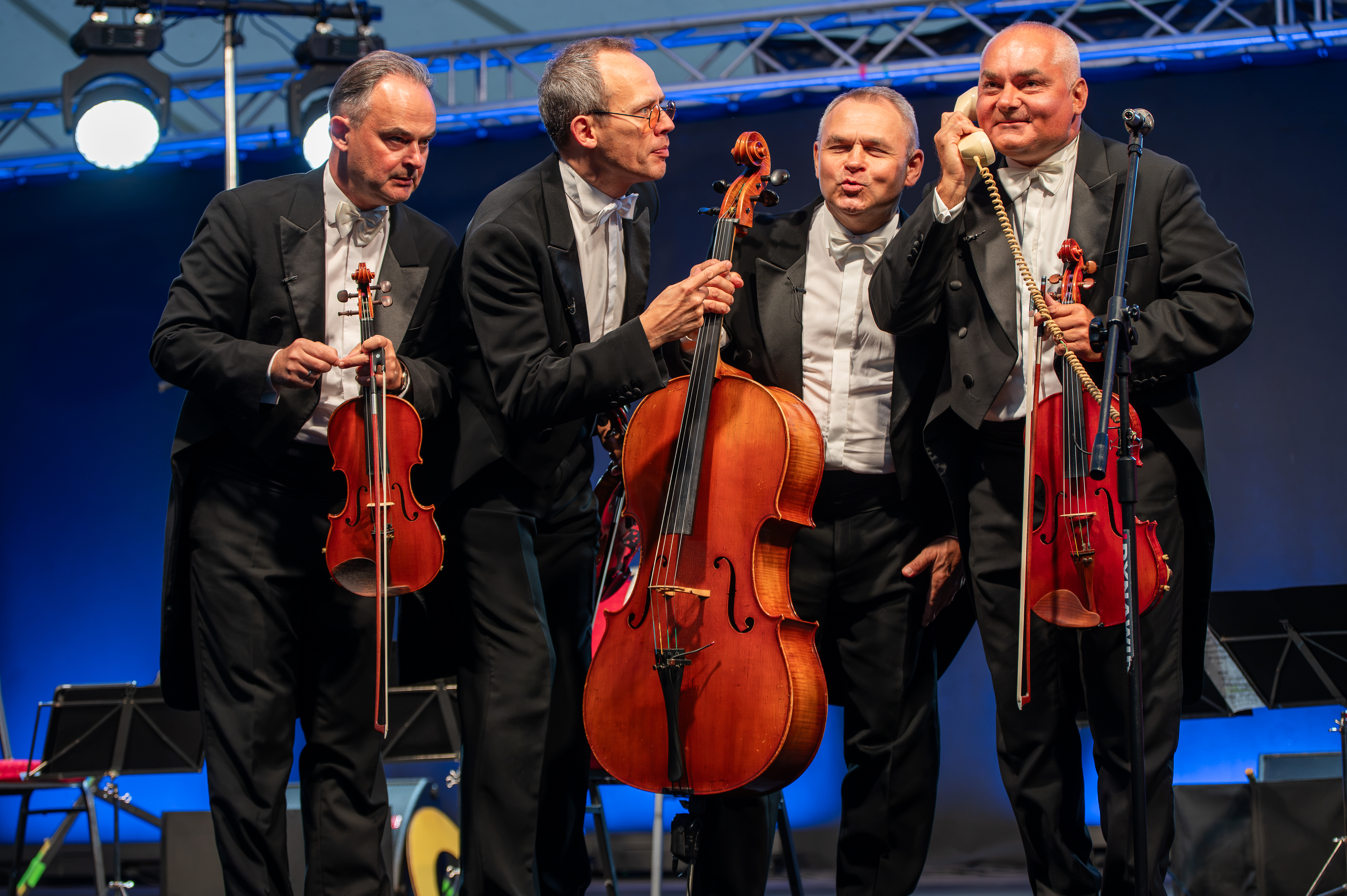
- In 2026

Background information
- Origin: Warsaw, Poland
- Genres: Contemporary classical
- Occupation: Comedy
- Years active: 1995–present
- Labels: New Abra, EMI Music Poland, Pomaton
- Members: Filip Jaślar, violin Michał Sikorski, violin Paweł Kowaluk, viola Bolesław (Bolek) Błaszczyk, cello
- Past members: † Artur Renion, cello
- Website: www.mozartgroup.net

The MozART group (Polish: Grupa MoCarta) is a cabaret and comedy string quartet based in Warsaw, Poland, known for its unique approach to classical music. The MozART group is a frequent TV guest including international galas and concerts.

== Awards and recognition ==
The quartet received prestigious prizes like the Grand Prix of the XVIII Festival of Satire and Comedy in Lidzbark; "Pingwin z brazu" (the Bronze Penguin) – the prize given by the cabaret community of Zielona Gora, an informal capitol of Polish cabaret and two Golden Troughs at the Ryjek Festival in Rybnik/Poland. In July 2010 the MozART group was awarded a special prize from the Ministry of Culture of the Republic of Poland for outstanding achievements and 15 years on stage. The 31st European Humor Festival GAGY in Slovakia awarded the MozART group with the 2011 Grand Prix. In March 2013 the MozART group was awarded all three main prizes at the 10th "Festival des Arts Burlesques" in St.Etienne/France: the Grand Prix of the Jury, the Audience Award and the Press Award.

A notable act is Jaślar playing Georges Bizet's "Habanera" from Carmen by simultaneously playing the tune with left hand pizzicato, singing the soprano part, playing the rhythm with a ping pong ball on a paddle and balancing on one leg.

On December 11, 2021, the MozART group performed for the 150th time in Paris within six years. This time at the Bobino Theater in Montparnasse. The quartet is the first Polish artist in history to have given such a large number of concerts in France's capital.

== Discography ==
=== Studio albums ===
Title	Album details	Peak chart positions	Certifications
Title	Album details	POL	Certifications
Kreatury– czyli Cztery pory roku według Grupy MoCarta	Released: October 2000; Label: Wyższa Szkoła Promocji/Pomaton EMI; Formats: CD	—	POL: Gold
Cztery struny świata	Released: March 2004; Label: Wyższa Szkoła Promocji/Pomaton EMI; Formats: CD	45	
"—" denotes a recording that did not chart or was not released in that territory.

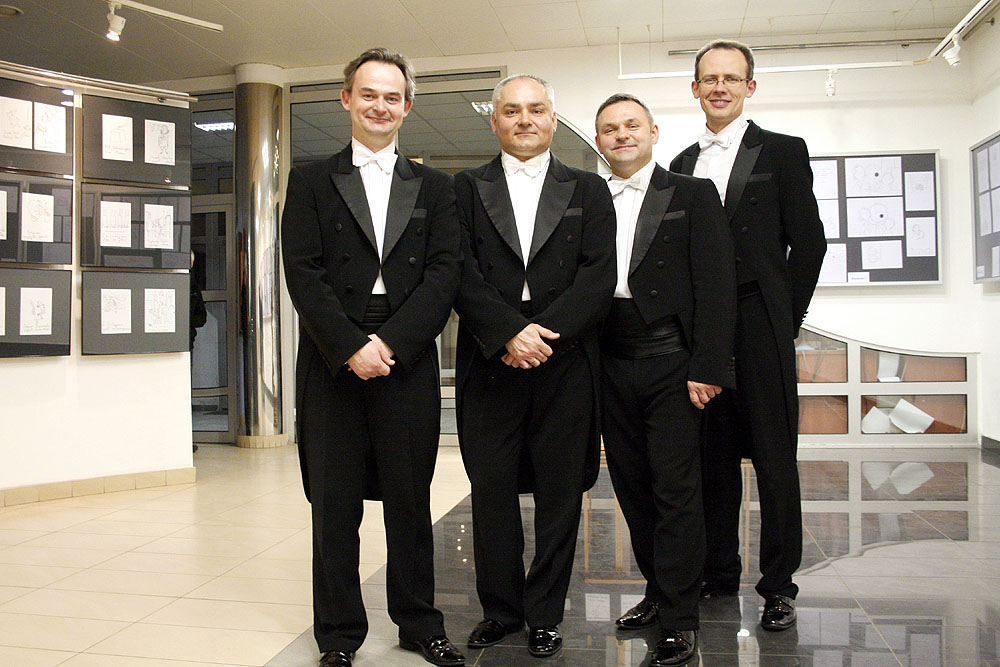
MozART Group in 2016

=== Video albums ===
Title	Video details
Grupa MoCarta w Operze	Released: September 28, 2007; Label: New Abra; Formats: DVD
Koncert Jubileuszowy	Released: October 31, 2007; Label: Wyższa Szkoła Promocji/Pomaton EMI; Formats: DVD
Grupa MoCarta w Teatrze	Released: November 21, 2008; Label: New Abra; Formats: DVD
Zamach na MoCarta, czyli jeżeli śpiewać, to nie indywidualnie	Released: March 15, 2011; Label: New Abra; Formats: DVD
Frak'n'Roll	Released: September 18, 2012; Label: EMI Music Poland; Formats: DVD, Blu-ray
Mozart comes to town	Released: December 16, 2017; Label: New Abra; Formats: DVD
Best of!	Released: February 1, 2008; Label: New Abra; Formats: DVD

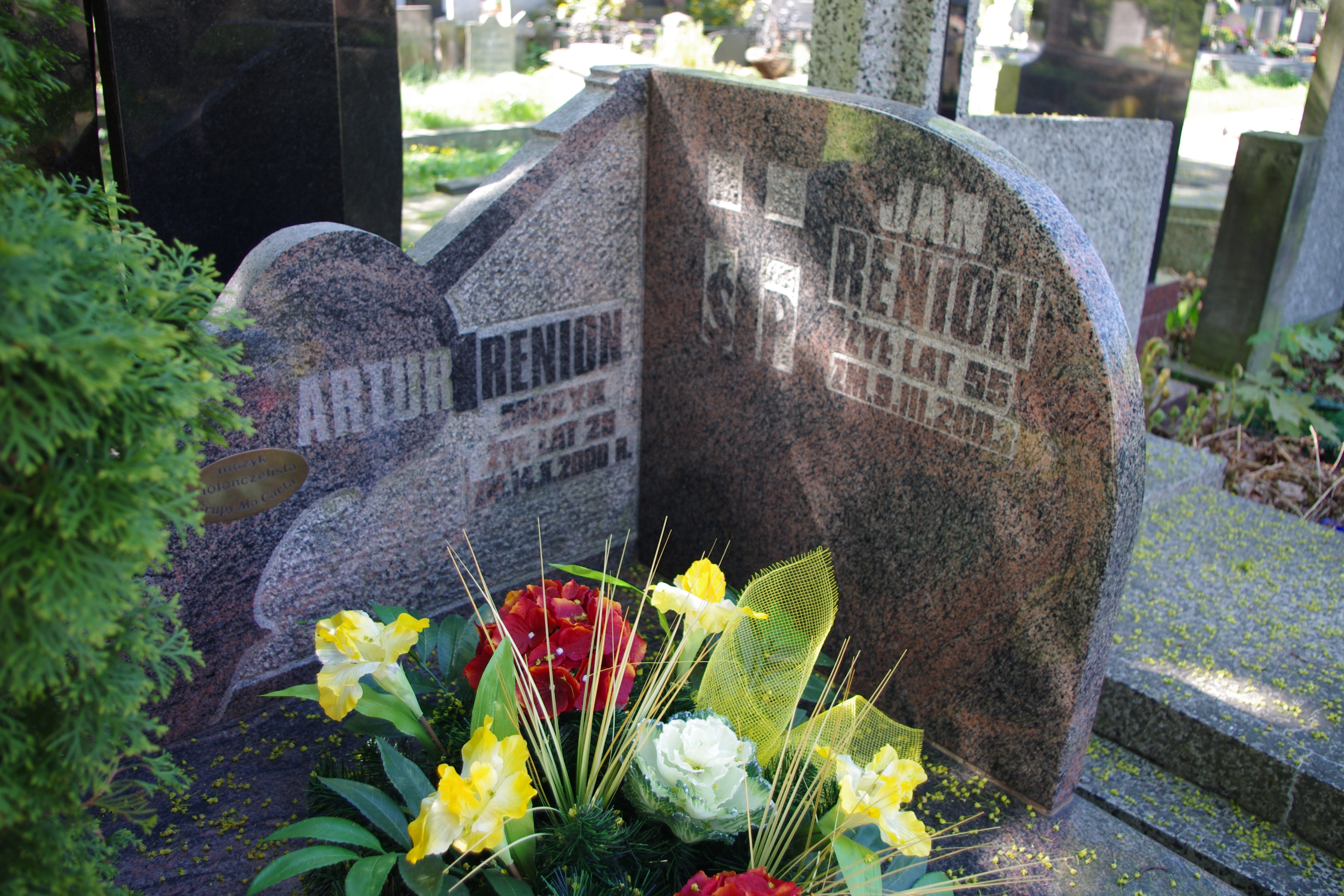
Grave of Artur Renion in Evangelical–Augsburg Cemetery, Warsaw

== Movies ==
- 1999: Chłopaki nie płaczą
- 2006: Miłość w przejściu podziemnym

== Awards ==
- 1997 Grand Prix XVIII Biesiad Satyry i Humoru "Złota szpilka" / Poland
- 1998 & 2000: second prize at the PAKA festival in Kraków / Poland 1998 i 2000
- 2001: "The bronze penguin", Zielona Góra / Poland
- 2002: Grand Prix at the Good Humour Festival in Gdańsk
- October 2009: Two golden Golden Troughs at the Ryjek Festival in Rybnik/Poland
- July 2010: Special Award from the Ministry of Culture of the Republic of Poland for outstanding achievements and 15 years on stage
- August 28, 2011: Grand Prix at the 31st GAGY Festival of Humor and Satire in Kremnica / Slovakia www.gagy.eu
- March 2013: all three main prizes at the 10th "Festival des Artes Burlesques" in St. Etienne/France: the Grand Prix of the Jury, the Audience Award and the Press Award
