= A Single Man (soundtrack) =

A Single Man (Original Motion Picture Soundtrack)

Film score by Abel Korzeniowski, Shigeru Umebayashi and various artists
- Released: December 22, 2009
- Recorded: 2009
- Studio: Eastwood Scoring Stage, Warner Bros. Studios, Burbank
- Genre: Film score
- Length: 51:52
- Label: Relativity Music Group
- Producer: Abel Korzeniowski; Bryan Elliott Lawson

Abel Korzeniowski chronology
Battle for Terra (2009)	A Single Man (2009)	Copernicus' Star (2011)

Shigeru Umebayashi chronology
Murderer (2009)	A Single Man (2009)	True Legend (2010)

A Single Man (Original Motion Picture Soundtrack) is the soundtrack album to the 2009 film A Single Man directed by fashion designer Tom Ford in his directorial debut. The album was released by Relativity Music Group on December 22, 2009, and consisted of original music composed by Abel Korzeniowski, operatic arias by Shigeru Umebayashi, as well as songs featured in the film.

== Development ==
Tom Ford initially wanted Japanese composer Shigeru Umebayashi to write the score, after being impressed by his work for In the Mood for Love (2000). Umebayashi, was however not free to compose the entire film due to scheduling conflicts and instead agree to write few pieces. He watched the film with Ford at Los Angeles and afterwards went to Japan to write some pieces for the score, two of them incorporates Bernard Herrmann's cues. The rest of the score is written by Abel Korzeniowski, who worked on few independent films and composed the animated films Battle for Terra (2007) and Copernicus' Star (2009).

"My main goal is to give music an additional identity within a film, but the music must always help the film maintain its structure [...] Other times, it's more important to concentrate on the characters, as was the case in The Single Man. I wanted to cover his transformation as a person—his emotional collapse after losing his love and how he goes about achieving life again."

— Abel Korzeniowski, on his score for The Single Man

Korzeniowski noted that Ford has given space in the film for the music, with the musical element being there. He noted the expansion of the score with respect to its script and characters and accompanied a broader soundscape. Ford wanted the principal instrument to be violin as "it the most human of all instruments. It can be sad and sound like it's crying." He wanted the score to be more emotional, lush as well as beautiful.

== Reception ==
Michael Rechtshaffen of The Hollywood Reporter wrote "The film score written by Abel Korzeniowski and Shigeru Umebayashi is variegated and full of lush orchestral themes that salute Hitchcock and Bernard Hermann, among others." Dave Calhoun of Time Out called it "an increasingly affecting score by Abel Korzeniowski". Dylan Chester of The Film Stage called it a "wonderful score". Mark Deming of AllMusic wrote "The original soundtrack album to A Single Man includes the original orchestral score composed for the film by Abel Korzeniowski, as well as a few vintage pop tunes and operatic arias used in the film."

Matt Goldberg of Collider called it a "beautiful score" reminiscent of Clint Mansell's work for The Fountain (2006). James Croot of Stuff wrote "a multinational composing team of Poland's Abel Korzeniowski and Japan's Shigeru Umebayashi (In the Mood For Love) combine to create a string-infused soundtrack that brings back memories of Bernard Hermann's work for Alfred Hitchcock on the likes of Psycho (1960) and Vertigo (1958)."

== Track listing ==
No.	Title	Artist(s)	Length
1.	"Stillness of the Mind"	Abel Korzeniowski	3:54
2.	"Drowning"	Abel Korzeniowski	1:48
3.	"Snow"	Abel Korzeniowski	1:15
4.	"Becoming George"	Abel Korzeniowski	3:51
5.	"George's Waltz"	Shigeru Umebayashi	1:40
6.	"Daydreams"	Abel Korzeniowski	2:16
7.	"Mescaline"	Abel Korzeniowski	3:10
8.	"Going Somewhere"	Abel Korzeniowski	1:59
9.	"(Variation On) Scotty Tails Madeleine"	Shigeru Umebayashi; Bernard Herrmann	1:52
10.	"Carlos"	Shigeru Umebayashi; Bernard Herrmann	1:01
11.	"La Wally, Act I: Ebben? / Ne Andro Lontana"	Miriam Gauci	3:29
12.	"Stormy Weather"	Etta James	3:10
13.	"Green Onions"	Booker T. & the M.G.'s	2:54
14.	"Blue Moon"	Jo Stafford	4:39
15.	"Swimming"	Abel Korzeniowski	1:39
16.	"And Just Like That"	Abel Korzeniowski	4:53
17.	"George's Waltz"	Shigeru Umebayashi	3:18
18.	"Sunset"	Abel Korzeniowski	2:59
19.	"Clock Tick"	Abel Korzeniowski	2:06

== Credits ==
Credits adapted from liner notes:

- Music composer and orchestrator – Abel Korzeniowski
- Producer – Bryan Elliot Lawson, Abel Korzeniowski
- Additional music – Shigeru Umebayashi
- Orchestra – Arigat Orchestra
- Conductor – Michael Nowak
- Recording – Minoru Tanaka
- Mixing – Minoru Tanaka, Joel Iwataki
- Mastering – Patricia Sullivan
- Music editor – Bryan Elliott Lawson, Julie Pearce
- Music supervisor – Julia Michels
- Executive producer – Tom Ford
- Artwork and design – Stuart Ford

== Accolades ==
Accolades received by Avatar (2009 film)
Award / Film festival	Date of ceremony	Category	Recipient(s)	Result	Ref.
Golden Globe Awards	January 17, 2010	Best Original Score	Abel Korzeniowski	Nominated	
International Film Music Critics Association Awards	February 26, 2010	Best Original Score for a Drama Film	Abel Korzeniowski	Won	
San Diego Film Critics Society	December 15, 2009	Best Score	Abel Korzeniowski	Won	
World Soundtrack Awards	October 23, 2010	Best Original Score of the Year	Abel Korzeniowski	Nominated	
World Soundtrack Awards	October 23, 2010	Discovery of the Year	Abel Korzeniowski	Won	
World Soundtrack Awards	October 23, 2010	Public Choice	Abel Korzeniowski	Won	
