= The Nun (soundtrack) =

The Nun (Original Motion Picture Soundtrack)

Film score by Abel Korzeniowski
- Released: August 31, 2018
- Recorded: 2017–2018
- Studios: Eastwood Scoring Stage, Warner Bros. Studios, Burbank
- Genre: Film score
- Length: 53:25
- Label: WaterTower Music
- Producer: Abel Korzeniowski

Abel Korzeniowski chronology
Nocturnal Animals (2017)	The Nun (2018)	The Courier (2021)

The Nun (Original Motion Picture Soundtrack) is the film score soundtrack to the 2018 film The Nun directed by Corin Hardy, a spiritual spin-off to The Conjuring 2 (2016) and the fifth installment in The Conjuring shared universe. Abel Korzeniowski composed the film score which was released under the WaterTower Music label on August 31, 2018.

== Development ==
In September 2017, it was reported that Abel Korzeniowski was assigned to compose the score for The Nun. Warner Bros. and New Line Cinema executives thought of using Abel's musical approach, and contacted Abel who in turn spoke to Hardy, who was filming for Romania at that time. Since he was involved in the film during the early stages of principal photography, it helped him accumulate layers of ideas for the film. Abel worked with Hardy closely during the production. Some of his influences include Krzysztof Komeda's score for Rosemary's Baby (1968) and Wojciech Kilar's score for Bram Stoker's Dracula (1992); Abel wanted to pay homage to that film's score through his composition.

Abel wanted the score to feel the sense of dread and has to affect the composer as if he was the audience watching the film, feeling the jump scares. Though, Abel refrained from referencing other films, he watched the first two films in The Conjuring Universe to know on how the audience would expect in a thematic way towards the film or he would write it in "a more romantic style, with more counterpoint and less electronics" otherwise. He tried to make it as more of an earlier form of horror film score and more orchestral than the previous films.

Since The Nun is set in the 1950s, it allowed him to use more elaborate melodic elements than The Conjuring and refrained the use of modern musical elements. The setting in Romania, helped him to learn about Romanian music elements, with influences of an Eastern Orthodox Church setting due to a male choir singing in lower octave and out of the world basses, which was different from other male choirs. The other vocal elements were used for pagan rituals which was deemed by the church as something Satanic. The hissing sounds come from the orchestral instruments, with the brass players hissing into the instruments. A session which he described it a "wild session", had him doing percussions, orchestral elements and scratching sounds. They also used seven huge brass drums and several other brass instruments that provided an unusual type of brass chorus that naturally ring outs from the brass drums. Abel worked on the score for over ten months, from September 2017 to July 2018.

== Track listing ==
No.	Title	Length
1.	"God Ends Here"	1:42
2.	"Sacrifice"	2:29
3.	"Sister Irene"	1:07
4.	"The Abbey of St. Carta"	2:19
5.	"Hanging Nun"	2:51
6.	"Valak"	2:59
7.	"Lost Souls"	2:17
8.	"Anything But Holy"	3:23
9.	"Veiled Mirrors"	1:04
10.	"Corridor of Crosses"	1:33
11.	"Perpetual Adoration"	1:48
12.	"Ice House"	1:22
13.	"Branded by the Demon"	2:42
14.	"Burning Cross"	1:01
15.	"They're All Gone"	1:50
16.	"Handmaid of God"	3:14
17.	"Into the Abyss"	3:09
18.	"Possessed"	1:42
19.	"Deliver Us from Evil"	3:06
20.	"‘Cause I Have Faith"	3:32
Total length:		45:10

== Reception ==
Anton Smit of Soundtrack World summarized "I really like the way Korzeniowski has approached the tense and scary moments with the natural sounds. You can hear the musicians using their instruments, making the sound very human. It is like they are using their instruments to transfer their own emotions into the music and in doing so are passing the same emotions to the audience in the cinema." Harry Windsor of The Hollywood Reporter described it as a "cavernous, vocals-heavy score". Sandy Schaefer of Screen Rant called it as an "ominous score".

== Personnel ==
Credits adapted from WaterTower Music:

- Music composer and producer – Abel Korzeniowski
- Score producer – Mina Korzeniowski
- Recording and mixing – James T. Hill
- Mastering – Patricia Sullivan
- Music editor – Lisé Richardson, Nate Underkuffler
- Score editor – Alexandre Cote, Vincent Cirilli
- Soundtrack coordinator – Kim Baum
- Pro-tools operator– Tom Hardisty
- Art direction – Dale Voelker

Orchestra and choir

- Performer – Hollywood Studio Symphony
- Orchestrator and conductor – Abel Korzeniowski
- Orchestra contractor – Mark Robertson
- Assistant orchestra contractor – Connie Boyland
- Vocal contractor – Bobbi Page
- Concertmaster – Mark Robertson
- Bass – Thom Harte (principal), Bart Samolis, Geoff Osika, Ian Walker, Mike Valerio, Steve Pfeifer
- Bassoon – Anthony Parnther (principal), Alex Rosales Garcia, Damian Montano
- Cello – David Low (principal), Alisha Bauer, David Mergen, Ginger Murphy, Jason Lippmann, Leah Metzler, Mia Barcia-Columbo, Victor Lawrence
- Choir – Allie Feder, Amick Byram, Amy Fogerson, Baraka May Williams, Bob Joyce, Bobbi Page, Diane Freiman Reynolds, Edie Lehmann Boddicker, Elin Carlson, Greg Whipple, Greg Geiger, Joanna Bushnell, Joe Santoni, Katherine Hoye, Kelci Hahn, Laura Dickinson, Laura Jackman, Meredith Pyle, Michael Geiger, Michael Lichtenauer, Monique Donnelly, Reid Bruton, Suzanne Waters, Walt Harrah, Will Goldman
- Clarinet – Josh Ranz (principal), Chris Stoutenborough
- Flute – Gina Luciani (principal), Johanna Borenstein, Sandy Hughes
- French Horn – Dylan Skye Hart (principal), Allen Fogle, Katie Faraudo, Laura Brenes, Preston Shepard, Stephanie Stetson, Teag Reaves
- Oboe – Jennifer Johnson (principal), Jessica Pearlman
- Percussion – Edward Atkatz (principal), MB Gordy (principal), Ken McGrath, Mike Deutsch, Pete Korpela, Robert Fernandez
- Throat singer – Dylan Gentile
- Trombone – Al Kaplan (principal), Nick Daley, Noah Gladstone
- Tuba – Philip Blake Cooper (principal), Gabriel Sears
- Viola – Andrew Duckles (principal), Aaron Oltman, Caroline Buckman, Leah Katz, Linnea Powell, Lynne Richburg, Maria Newman, Matt Funes, Meredith Crawford, Scott Hosfeld
- Violin – Alyssa Park (principal 2nd), Abigail Khalek, Amy Wickman, Ana Landauer, Armen Anassian, Ashoka Thiagarajan, Ben Jacobson, Charlene Huang, Cheryl Kim, Daphne Chen, Eugenia Choi, Eun-Mee Ahn, Jean Kim, Jennifer Choi Fischer, Jordan Ann Martone, Josefina Vergara, Luanne Homzy, Marisa Kuney, Mona Tian, Neli Nikolaeva, Paul Cartwright, Peter Kent, Rebecca Chung Hamilton, Sam Fischer, Songa Lee, Tammy Hatwan
