= 07 Come In =

Polish crime television series

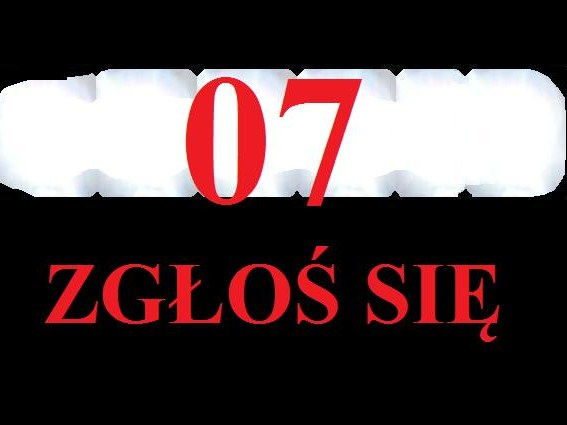
- Title card
- Genre: Action, police procedural
- Based on: Ewa wzywa 07
- Written by: Krzysztof Szmagier
- Directed by: Krzysztof Szmagier; Kazimierz Tarnas; Michal Dudziewicz
- Starring: Bronisław Cieślak; Zdzislaw Tobiasz; Ewa Florczak; Zdzislaw Kozien
- Composer: Włodzimierz Korcz
- Country of origin: Poland
- Original language: Polish
- No. of seasons: 5
- No. of episodes: 21

Production
- Cinematography: Wieslaw Rutowicz; Jan Hesse
- Editor: Anna Maria Czolnik
- Running time: 60 minutes
- Production company: Studio Filmowe Kadr

Original release
- Release: 25 November 1976 – 25 May 1989

07 Come In (Polish: 07 zgłoś się) is a Polish criminal television series broadcast on TVP from 25 November 1976 to 25 May 1989. The series consists of 21 episodes, divided into five seasons, filmed in 1976, 1978, 1981, 1984, and 1987, respectively. It combines elements of action and police procedural genres.

== Background ==
Directed by Krzysztof Szmagier and scored by Wlodzimierz Korcz, the series centers on the investigations of Citizens' Militia Lieutenant Sławomir Borewicz (played by Bronisław Cieślak), who solves a different case in each episode. The show is loosely based on the novel series Ewa wzywa 07 (Ewa calls 07). The title of both the novels and the TV series refers to "zero-seven", a police radio call-sign used by Borewicz. The show shared several similarities, and one complete storyline, with the comic book series Kapitan Żbik.

Despite being widely considered a work of propaganda aimed at warming the image of the "Citizen's Militia", the series proved highly popular in Poland and even gained a cult following. Critics called it "one of the biggest achievements of Polish crime drama", a "raw and realistic response to James Bond", and "the most popular Polish police series ever".
