= Taniec z gwiazdami season 17 =

Taniec z gwiazdami
- Season 17
- Hosted by: Krzysztof Ibisz; Anna Głogowska
- Judges: Andrzej Grabowski; Iwona Pavlović; Beata Tyszkiewicz; Michał Malitowski
- Celebrity winner: Ewelina Lisowska
- Professional winner: Tomasz Barański
- No. of episodes: 10

Release
- Original network: Polsat
- Original release: 11 September – 13 November 2015

Season chronology
- ← Previous; 16 Next → 18

The 17th season of Taniec z gwiazdami, the Polish edition of Dancing With the Stars, started on 11 September 2015. This is the fourth season aired on Polsat. Krzysztof Ibisz and Anna Głogowska returned as hosts and Beata Tyszkiewicz, Iwona Pavlović, Michał Malitowski and Andrzej Grabowski returned as judges.

On 13 November, Ewelina Lisowska and her partner Tomasz Barański were crowned the champions.

== Couples ==
Celebrity	Occupation	Professional partner	Status
Sławomir Uniatowski	Singer and Idol runner-up	Magdalena Soszyńska-Michno	Eliminated 1st on 11 September 2015
Magdalena Lamparska	39 i pół actress	Kamil Kuroczko	Eliminated 2nd on 18 September 2015
Małgorzata Tomaszewska-Słomina	Model and Polsat weather presenter	Robert Kochanek	Eliminated 3rd on 25 September 2015
Rafał Mohr	Film and television actor	Nina Tyrka	Eliminated 4th on 2 October 2015
Artur Pontek	Ojciec Mateusz actor	Natalia Głębocka	Eliminated 5th on 9 October 2015
Anna Cieślak	Film and television actress	Rafał Maserak	Withdrew on 23 October 2015
Patryk Pniewski	Pierwsza miłość actor	Valeriya Zhuravlyova	Eliminated 7th on 23 October 2015
Małgorzata Pieńkowska	M jak miłość actress	Stefano Terrazzino	Eliminated 8th on 30 October 2015
Cleo	Singer and Eurovision 2014 finalist	Jan Kliment	Third place on 6 November 2015
Łukasz Kadziewicz	Volleyball player and World Championship 2006 silver medalist	Agnieszka Kaczorowska	Runners-up on 13 November 2015
Ewelina Lisowska	Singer and X Factor finalist	Tomasz Barański	Winners on 13 November 2015; Eliminated 6th on 16 October 2015

== Scores ==
Couple	Place	1	2	3	4	5	6	7	8	9		10
Ewelina & Tomasz	1	33	38†	40†	39†	38+6=44†	34+36=70	40†	10+40+40=90†	37+39=76†	—	40+40+40=120†
Łukasz & Agnieszka	2	36†	35	34	36+1=37	32+5=37	30+34=64‡	36+40=76†	37+38=75	35+39=74‡	+40=114‡	40+39+40=119‡
Cleo & Jan	3	36†	34	40†	35	35+4=39	37+34=71	37+37=74	38+40=78	37+39=76†	+40=116†	
Małgorzata & Stefano	4	27‡	29	33	29‡	30+2=32	32+36=68	38+35=73	39+33=72‡			
Patryk & Valeriya	5	32	28	29	32+1=33	34+1=35	34+34=68	33+37=70‡				
Anna & Rafał	6	32	33	38	34	35+7=42	39+36=75†	—				
Artur & Natalia	7	36†	34	29	29+1=30	28+3=31‡						
Rafał & Nina	8	36†	34	28‡	34+1=35							
Małgorzata & Robert	9	34	30	33								
Magdalena & Kamil	10	27‡	27‡									
Sławomir & Magdalena	11	27‡										

Red numbers indicate the lowest score for each week.
Green numbers indicate the highest score for each week.
indicates the couple eliminated that week.
indicates the returning couple that finished in the bottom two.
this couple withdrew from the competition.
this couple was eliminated but later returned to the competition.
indicates the couple saved from elimination by immunity.
indicates the winning couple.
indicates the runner-up.
indicates the couple in third place.

== Average score chart ==
This table only counts for dances scored on a traditional 40-points scale.

Rank by average	Place	Couple	Total points	Number of dances	Average
1	1	Ewelina & Tomasz	574	15	38.3
2	3	Cleo & Jan	519	14	37.1
3	2	Łukasz & Agnieszka	621	17	36.5
4	6	Anna & Rafał	247	7	35.3
5	8	Rafał & Nina	132	4	33.0
6	4	Małgorzata & Stefano	361	11	32.8
7	5	Patryk & Valeriya	293	9	32.6
8	9	Małgorzata & Robert	97	3	32.3
9	7	Artur & Natalia	156	5	31.2
10	10	Magdalena & Kamil	54	2	27.0
10	11	Sławomir & Magdalena	27	1	27.0

== Highest and lowest scoring performances ==
The best and worst performances in each dance according to the judges' 40-point scale are as follows:

Dance	Best dancer(s)	Highest score	Worst dancer(s)	Lowest score
Jive	Cleo; Łukasz Kadziewicz	37	Patryk Pniewski; Łukasz Kadziewicz	32
Cha-cha-cha	Łukasz Kadziewicz	40	Małgorzata Pieńkowska; Magdalena Lamparska	27
Foxtrot	Ewelina Lisowska	40	Sławomir Uniatowski	27
Waltz	Rafał Mohr; Łukasz Kadziewicz	36	Magdalena Lamparska	27
Rumba	Cleo; Łukasz Kadziewicz	40	Artur Pontek	28
Viennese Waltz	Łukasz Kadziewicz	40	Małgorzata Pieńkowska	29
Jazz	Cleo	40	Cleo	35
Samba	Ewelina Lisowska	40	Patryk Pniewski	29
Argentine Tango	Ewelina Lisowska	40	Rafał Mohr	28
Salsa	Ewelina Lisowska	40		
Quickstep	Cleo	38	Patryk Pniewski	33
Contemporary	Ewelina Lisowska	40	Małgorzata Pieńkowska	29
Paso Doble	Łukasz Kadziewicz	39	Łukasz Kadziewicz	36
Charleston	Małgorzata Pieńkowska	32		
Disco	Anna Cieślak	39		
Hip-hop	Patryk Pniewski	34		
Tango	Cleo	39		
Rock and Roll Marathon	Anna Cieślak	7	Patryk Pniewski	1
Team Dance	Ewelina Lisowska; Anna Cieślak; Małgorzata Pieńkowska	36	Łukasz Kadziewicz; Cleo; Patryk Pniewski	34
Freestyle	Ewelina Lisowska; Cleo	40	Małgorzata Pieńkowska	33

== Couples' highest and lowest scoring dances ==
According to the traditional 40-point scale:

Couples	Highest scoring dance(s)	Lowest scoring dance(s)
Ewelina & Tomasz	Salsa, Samba, Contemporary, Freestyle (twice), Argentine Tango, Foxtrot (40)	Jive (33)
Łukasz & Agnieszka	Rumba (twice), Cha-cha-cha, Viennese Waltz (40)	Foxtrot (30)
Cleo & Jan	Rumba, Freestyle, Jazz (40)	Waltz, Team Dance (34)
Małgorzata & Stefano	Viennese Waltz (39)	Cha-cha-cha (27)
Patryk & Valeriya	Contemporary (37)	Cha-cha-cha (28)
Anna & Rafał	Disco (39)	Foxtrot (32)
Artur & Natalia	Jive (36)	Rumba (28)
Rafał & Nina	Waltz (36)	Argentine Tango (28)
Małgorzata & Robert	Foxtrot (34)	Rumba (30)
Magdalena & Kamil	Cha-cha-cha, Waltz (27)	Cha-cha-cha, Waltz (27)
Sławomir & Magdalena	Foxtrot (27)	Foxtrot (27)

== Weekly scores ==
Unless indicated otherwise, individual judges scores in the charts below (given in parentheses) are listed in this order from left to right: Andrzej Grabowski, Iwona Pavlović, Beata Tyszkiewicz and Michał Malitowski.

=== Week 1: Season Premiere ===
Running order

Couple	Score	Dance	Music	Result
Ewelina & Tomasz	33 (9,8,9,7)	Jive	"Thank You Very Much"—Margaret	Safe
Małgorzata & Stefano	27 (8,5,8,6)	Cha-cha-cha	"Perhaps, Perhaps, Perhaps"—Doris Day	Safe
Sławomir & Magdalena	27 (8,4,10,5)	Foxtrot	"Let's Fall in Love"—Frank Sinatra	Eliminated
Magdalena & Kamil	27 (8,6,8,5)	Cha-cha-cha	"Chwile jak te"—Kamil Bednarek	Bottom two
Rafał & Nina	36 (10,9,9,8)	Waltz	"Unchained Melody"—The Righteous Brothers	Safe
Małgorzata & Robert	34 (10,8,9,7)	Foxtrot	"Don't Worry Be Happy"—Bobby McFerrin	Safe
Patryk & Valeriya	32 (9,7,9,7)	Jive	"Hit the Road Jack"—Ray Charles	Safe
Anna & Rafał	32 (9,6,10,7)	Foxtrot	"Isn't She Lovely"—Stevie Wonder	Safe
Artur & Natalia	36 (9,9,9,9)	Jive	"Do You Love Me"—The Contours	Safe
Łukasz & Agnieszka	36 (10,9,10,7)	Waltz	"Moon River"—Audrey Hepburn	Safe
Cleo & Jan	36 (9,9,9,9)	Cha-cha-cha	"Want To Want Me"—Jason Derulo	Safe

=== Week 2: Most Memorable Moments ===
Running order

Couple	Score	Dance	Music	Result
Małgorzata & Robert	30 (9,6,9,6)	Rumba	"Naucz mnie"—Sarsa	Bottom two
Artur & Natalia	34 (10,8,9,7)	Viennese Waltz	"Dmuchawce, latawce, wiatr"—Urszula	Safe
Anna & Rafał	33 (10,7,9,7)	Jive	"Hey Ya!"—Outkast	Safe
Cleo & Jan	34 (9,7,10,8)	Waltz	"(You Make Me Feel Like) A Natural Woman"—Aretha Franklin	Safe
Patryk & Valeriya	28 (9,5,8,6)	Cha-cha-cha	"Uptown Funk"—Mark Ronson featuring Bruno Mars	Safe
Magdalena & Kamil	27 (9,4,9,5)	Waltz	"You Are So Beautiful"—Joe Cocker	Eliminated
Rafał & Nina	34 (10,9,8,7)	Jive	"Part-Time Lover"—Stevie Wonder	Safe
Małgorzata & Stefano	29 (9,6,8,6)	Viennese Waltz	"Moje jedyne marzenie"—Anna Jantar	Safe
Łukasz & Agnieszka	35 (9,9,10,7)	Rumba	"One"—U2	Safe
Ewelina & Tomasz	38 (9,10,10,9)	Jazz	"Wrecking Ball"—Miley Cyrus	Safe

=== Week 3: Latin Week ===
Running order

Couple	Score	Dance	Music	Result
Patryk & Valeriya	29 (8,6,8,7)	Samba	"Bailamos"—Enrique Iglesias	Safe
Łukasz & Agnieszka	34 (10,7,9,8)	Cha-cha-cha	"Smooth"—Santana	Safe
Anna & Rafał	38 (10,9,10,9)	Argentine Tango	"Así se baila el tango"—Veronica Verdier	Safe
Małgorzata & Stefano	33 (9,7,10,7)	Rumba	"Beautiful Maria of My Soul"—Antonio Banderas	Bottom two
Ewelina & Tomasz	40 (10,10,10,10)	Salsa	"La Vida Es Un Carnaval"—Celia Cruz	Safe
Rafał & Nina	28 (9,4,9,6)	Argentine Tango	"La cumparsita"—Gerardo Matos Rodríguez	Safe
Cleo & Jan	40 (10,10,10,10)	Rumba	"Bésame Mucho"—Cesária Évora	Safe
Artur & Natalia	29 (9,5,9,6)	Cha-cha-cha	"Guantanamera"—Joseíto Fernández	Safe
Małgorzata & Robert	33 (9,8,9,7)	Samba	"Livin' la Vida Loca"—Ricky Martin	Eliminated

=== Week 4: My place on Earth ===
Running order

Couple	Score	Dance	Music	Result
Cleo & Jan	35 (10,7,10,8)	Quickstep	"Candyman"—Christina Aguilera	Safe
Anna & Rafał	34 (10,8,10,6)	Cha-cha-cha	"The Best"—Tina Turner	Safe
Artur & Natalia	29 (8,6,9,6)	Foxtrot	"Dream a Little Dream of Me"—Mama Cass	Bottom two
Małgorzata & Stefano	29 (9,6,8,6)	Contemporary	"The Four Seasons"—Antonio Vivaldi	Safe
Rafał & Nina	34 (9,9,8,8)	Cha-cha-cha	"Vogue"—Madonna	Eliminated
Łukasz & Agnieszka	36 (10,9,10,7)	Paso Doble	"Go West"—Pet Shop Boys	Safe
Patryk & Valeriya	32 (8,7,9,8)	Contemporary	"Scarlett"—LemON	Safe
Ewelina & Tomasz	39 (10,10,10,9)	Foxtrot	"Hello"—Lionel Richie	Safe
Anna; Ewelina; Małgorzata; Cleo	0	Solo Dance (Girls Group)	"Don't Worry"—Madcon & Ray Dalton	
Łukasz; Rafał; Patryk; Artur	1	Solo Dance (Boys Group)	"Don't Worry"—Madcon & Ray Dalton	

=== Week 5: Polish Friday ===
Running order

Couple	Score	Dance	Music	Result
Łukasz & Agnieszka	32 (10,6,10,6)	Jive	"Black and White"—Kombi	Runner-up
Cleo & Jan	35 (10,8,10,7)	Jazz	"Wybacz"—Ira	Safe
Małgorzata & Stefano	30 (8,5,10,7)	Foxtrot	"Lecę tam"—Kasia Popowska	Safe
Patryk & Valeriya	34 (10,9,9,6)	Rumba	"Wiem, że jesteś tam"—Anna Wyszkoni	Bottom two
Ewelina & Tomasz	38 (10,10,10,8)	Cha-cha-cha	"Na pewno"—Tabb & Sound'n'Grace	Winner
Anna & Rafał	35 (10,7,10,8)	Contemporary	"Dzień za dniem"—Patrycja Markowska	Safe
Artur & Natalia	28 (9,6,8,5)	Rumba	"Magiczne słowa"—Rafał Brzozowski	Eliminated
Anna & Rafał; Ewelina & Tomasz; Łukasz & Agnieszka; Cleo & Jan; Artur & Natalia; Małgorzata & Stefano; Patryk & Valeriya	7; 6; 5; 4; 3; 2; 1	Rock and Roll (Maraton)	"Nie bądź taki szybki Bill"—Katarzyna Sobczyk	

=== Week 6: Eras Week ===
The teams were chosen by the winner and runner-up couples in 5th episode – Ewelina & Tomasz and Łukasz & Agnieszka.

Running order

Couple	Score	Era	Dance	Music	Result
Ewelina & Tomasz	34 (10,7,10,7)	10's	Viennese Waltz	"Usta milczą, dusza śpiewa"—Jan Kiepura & Marta Eggerth	Eliminated
Małgorzata & Stefano	32 (9,6,10,7)	20's	Charleston	"Entrance of the Gladiators"—Julius Fučík	Safe
Łukasz & Agnieszka	30 (9,6,9,6)	30's	Foxtrot	"Summertime"—George Gershwin	Safe
Cleo & Jan	37 (10,9,10,8)	50's	Jive	"Let's Twist Again"—Chubby Checker	Safe
Anna & Rafał	39 (10,10,10,9)	70's	Disco	"Sunny"—Boney M.	Bottom two
Patryk & Valeriya	34 (10,8,9,7)	90's	Hip-hop	"Ice Ice Baby"—Vanilla Ice	Safe
Łukasz & Agnieszka; Cleo & Jan; Patryk & Valeriya	34 (10,9,9,6)	Future	Freestyle (Team Niebiańskie Bąki)	"Rather Be"—Clean Bandit feat. Jess Glynne	
Ewelina & Tomasz; Anna & Rafał; Małgorzata & Stefano	36 (9,10,10,7)	Future	Freestyle (Team Wirujące Miednice)	"How Deep Is Your Love"—Calvin Harris feat. Disciples	

=== Week 7: My first time ===
Running order

Couple	Score	Dance	Music	Result
Cleo & Jan	37 (10,9,10,8)	Viennese Waltz	"I Have Nothing"—Whitney Houston	Bottom two
Cleo & Jan	37 (10,8,10,9)	Cha-cha-cha	"Testosteron"—Kayah	Bottom two
Ewelina & Tomasz	40 (10,10,10,10)	Samba	"Fireball"—Pitbull featuring John Ryan	Safe (Immunity)
Patryk & Valeriya	33 (9,8,9,7)	Quickstep	"Nah Neh Nah"—Vaya Con Dios	Eliminated
Patryk & Valeriya	37 (10,9,10,8)	Contemporary	"Take Me to Church"—Hozier	Eliminated
Małgorzata & Stefano	38 (10,8,10,10)	Argentine Tango	"Escena Pelicula"—Carlos Saura from Tango	Safe
Małgorzata & Stefano	35 (10,7,10,8)	Cha-cha-cha	"A Night like This"—Caro Emerald	Safe
Łukasz & Agnieszka	36 (9,10,10,7)	Viennese Waltz	"To, co chciałbym Ci dać"—Pectus	Safe
Łukasz & Agnieszka	40 (10,10,10,10)	Rumba	"I'm Not the Only One"—Sam Smith	Safe
Anna & Rafał	—	Samba	—	Withdrew
Anna & Rafał	—	Argentine Tango	"Por Una Cabeza"—Carlos Gardel from Scent of a Woman	Withdrew

=== Week 8: Halloween Night ===
Running order

Couple (Trio Dance Partner)	Score	Dance	Music	Result
Ewelina & Tomasz; Małgorzata & Stefano; Łukasz & Agnieszka; Cleo & Jan	10 - - -	Cha-cha-cha	"Let's Get Loud"—Jennifer Lopez	
Łukasz & Agnieszka (Nina Tyrka)	37 (10,8,10,9)	Jive	"Two Hearts"—Phil Collins	Safe
Łukasz & Agnieszka (Nina Tyrka)	38 (10,9,10,9)	Freestyle	"The Phantom of the Opera"—Sarah Brightman & Michael Crawford from The Phantom of the Opera	Safe
Małgorzata & Stefano (Kamil Kuroczko)	39 (10,10,10,9)	Viennese Waltz	"Niech żyje bal"—Maryla Rodowicz	Eliminated
Małgorzata & Stefano (Kamil Kuroczko)	33 (9,7,9,8)	Freestyle	"Cruella de Vil"—Bill Lee from 101 Dalmatians	Eliminated
Ewelina & Tomasz (Magdalena Soszyńska)	40 (10,10,10,10)	Contemporary	"Another Love"—Tom Odell	Safe
Ewelina & Tomasz (Magdalena Soszyńska)	40 (10,10,10,10)	Freestyle	"I'd Do Anything for Love (But I Won't Do That)"—Meat Loaf	Safe
Cleo & Jan (Valeriya Zhuravlyova)	38 (10,9,10,9)	Quickstep	"Cheri Cheri Lady"—Modern Talking	Bottom two
Cleo & Jan (Valeriya Zhuravlyova)	40 (10,10,10,10)	Freestyle	"Thriller"—Michael Jackson	Bottom two

=== Week 9: Radio Hits (Semi-final) ===
Running order

Couple	Score	Dance	Music	Result
Ewelina & Tomasz	37 (10,10,9,8)	Cha-cha-cha	"Ktoś nowy"—VIDEO	Safe
Ewelina & Tomasz	39 (10,10,10,9)	Rumba	"Light My Fire"—The Doors	Safe
Cleo & Jan	37 (9,9,10,9)	Rumba	"Sam na sam"—Szymon Chodyniecki	Bottom two
Cleo & Jan	39 (10,9,10,10)	Tango	"El Tango de Roxanne"—The Police from Moulin Rouge!	Bottom two
Łukasz & Agnieszka	35 (10,7,10,8)	Contemporary	"Pomimo burz"—Antek Smykiewicz	Bottom two
Łukasz & Agnieszka	39 (10,10,10,9)	Paso Doble	"It's My Life"—Bon Jovi	Bottom two

Dance-off

Running order

Couple	Score	Dance	Music	Result
Cleo & Jan	40 (10,10,10,10)	Jazz	"Wybacz"—Ira	Eliminated
Łukasz & Agnieszka	40 (10,10,10,10)	Cha-cha-cha	"Smooth"—Santana	Safe

=== Week 10: Season Finale ===
Running order

Couple (Judge)	Score	Dance	Music	Result
Łukasz & Agnieszka (Michał Malitowski)	40 (10,10,10,10)	Rumba	"Always on My Mind"—Willie Nelson	Runners-up
Łukasz & Agnieszka (Michał Malitowski)	39 (10,10,10,9)	Freestyle	"Circle of Life" ("Krąg Życia") from The Lion King	Runners-up
Łukasz & Agnieszka (Michał Malitowski)	40 (10,10,10,10)	Viennese Waltz	"Nie proszę o więcej"—Edyta Górniak	Runners-up
Ewelina & Tomasz (Iwona Pavlović)	40 (10,10,10,10)	Argentine Tango	"Por Una Cabeza"—Carlos Gardel from Scent of a Woman	Winners
Ewelina & Tomasz (Iwona Pavlović)	40 (10,10,10,10)	Freestyle	"Atmadja" and "Alegria" from Cirque du Soleil	Winners
Ewelina & Tomasz (Iwona Pavlović)	40 (10,10,10,10)	Foxtrot	"Hello"—Lionel Richie	Winners

Other Dances

Couple	Dance	Music
Sławomir & Magdalena; Magdalena & Kamil; Małgorzata & Robert; Rafał & Nina; Artur & Natalia; Patryk & Valeriya; Małgorzata & Stefano; Cleo & Jan	Bollywood	"Ooh La La Tu Hai Meri Fantasy" from The Dirty Picture

== Dance chart ==
The celebrities and professional partners danced one of these routines for each corresponding week:

- Week 1 (Season Premiere): Cha-cha-cha, Waltz, Jive, Foxtrot
- Week 2 (Most Memorable Moments): One unlearned dance (introducing Rumba, Viennese Waltz, Jazz)
- Week 3 (Latin Week): One unlearned dance (introducing Samba, Salsa, Argentine Tango)
- Week 4 (My place on Earth): One unlearned dance (introducing Paso doble, Contemporary, Quickstep)
- Week 5 (Polish Friday): One unlearned dance and Rock'n'Roll marathon
- Week 6 (Eras Week): One unlearned dance and Team Freestyle (introducing Charleston, Hip-hop, Disco)
- Week 7 (My first time): One unlearned dance and one repeated dance
- Week 8 (Halloween Night/Trio Challenge): Cha-cha-cha duel, one repeated dance (trio dances) and Freestyle
- Week 9 (Semi-final: Radio Hits): One unlearned dance, one repeated dance and dance-off (introducing Tango)
- Week 10 (Season Finale): Judges' choice, Freestyle and couple's favorite dance of the season.

Couple	1	2	3	4	5		6		7		8			9			10		
Ewelina & Tomasz	Jive	Jazz	Salsa	Foxtrot	Cha-cha-cha	Rock'n'Roll; Marathon	Viennese Waltz	Freestyle (Team Wirujące Miednice)	Samba	- (Immunity)	Cha-cha-cha	Contemporary	Freestyle	Cha-cha-cha	Rumba	- (Immunity)	Argentine Tango	Freestyle	Foxtrot
Łukasz & Agnieszka	Waltz	Rumba	Cha-cha-cha	Paso Doble	Jive	Rock'n'Roll; Marathon	Foxtrot	Freestyle (Team Niebiańskie Bąki)	Viennese Waltz	Rumba	Cha-cha-cha	Jive	Freestyle	Contemporary	Paso Doble	Cha-cha-cha	Rumba	Freestyle	Viennese Waltz
Cleo & Jan	Cha-cha-cha	Waltz	Rumba	Quickstep	Jazz	Rock'n'Roll; Marathon	Jive	Freestyle (Team Niebiańskie Bąki)	Viennese Waltz	Cha-cha-cha	Cha-cha-cha	Quickstep	Freestyle	Rumba	Tango	Jazz			Bollywood
Małgorzata & Stefano	Cha-cha-cha	Viennese Waltz	Rumba	Contemporary	Foxtrot	Rock'n'Roll; Marathon	Charleston	Freestyle (Team Wirujące Miednice)	Argentine Tango	Cha-cha-cha	Cha-cha-cha	Viennese Waltz	Freestyle						Bollywood
Patryk & Valeriya	Jive	Cha-cha-cha	Samba	Contemporary	Rumba	Rock'n'Roll; Marathon	Hip-hop	Freestyle (Team Niebiańskie Bąki)	Quickstep	Contemporary									Bollywood
Anna & Rafał	Foxtrot	Jive	Argentine Tango	Cha-cha-cha	Contemporary	Rock'n'Roll; Marathon	Disco	Freestyle (Team Wirujące Miednice)	Samba	Argentine Tango									Bollywood
Artur & Natalia	Jive	Viennese Waltz	Cha-cha-cha	Foxtrot	Rumba	Rock'n'Roll; Marathon													Bollywood
Rafał & Nina	Waltz	Jive	Argentine Tango	Cha-cha-cha															Bollywood
Małgorzata & Robert	Foxtrot	Rumba	Samba																Bollywood
Magdalena & Kamil	Cha-cha-cha	Waltz																	Bollywood
Sławomir & Magdalena	Foxtrot																		Bollywood

Highest scoring dance
Lowest scoring dance
Performed, but not scored
Not performed due to withdrawal
Bonus points

== Call-out order ==
Order	Week 1	Week 2	Week 3	Week 4	Week 5	Week 6	Week 7	Week 8	Week 9	Week 10
1	Artur & Natalia	Małgorzata & Stefano	Anna & Rafał	Cleo & Jan	Ewelina & Tomasz	Łukasz & Agnieszka	Ewelina & Tomasz	Ewelina & Tomasz	Ewelina & Tomasz	Ewelina & Tomasz
2	Łukasz & Agnieszka	Łukasz & Agnieszka	Cleo & Jan	Ewelina & Tomasz	Łukasz & Agnieszka	Patryk & Valeriya	Łukasz & Agnieszka	Łukasz & Agnieszka	Łukasz & Agnieszka	Łukasz & Agnieszka
3	Małgorzata & Stefano	Ewelina & Tomasz	Ewelina & Tomasz	Patryk & Valeriya	Cleo & Jan	Cleo & Jan	Małgorzata & Stefano	Cleo & Jan	Cleo & Jan	
4	Cleo & Jan	Patryk & Valeriya	Artur & Natalia	Anna & Rafał	Małgorzata & Stefano	Małgorzata & Stefano	Cleo & Jan	Małgorzata & Stefano		
5	Patryk & Valeriya	Cleo & Jan	Łukasz & Agnieszka	Łukasz & Agnieszka	Anna & Rafał	Anna & Rafał	Patryk & Valeriya			
6	Rafał & Nina	Artur & Natalia	Rafał & Nina	Małgorzata & Stefano	Patryk & Valeriya	Ewelina & Tomasz	Anna & Rafał			
7	Ewelina & Tomasz	Rafał & Nina	Patryk & Valeriya	Artur & Natalia	Artur & Natalia					
8	Małgorzata & Robert	Anna & Rafał	Małgorzata & Stefano	Rafał & Nina						
9	Anna & Rafał	Małgorzata & Robert	Małgorzata & Robert							
10	Magdalena & Kamil	Magdalena & Kamil								
11	Sławomir & Magdalena									

This couple came in first place with the judges.
This couple came in last place with the judges.
This couple came in last place with the judges and was eliminated.
This couple was eliminated.
This couple withdrew from the competition.
This couple was saved from elimination by immunity.
This couple won the competition.
This couple came in second in the competition.
This couple came in third in the competition.

== Guest performances ==
Date	Artist(s)	Song(s)	Dancers
11 September 2015	Tomasz Szymuś's Orchestra	"Shut up and Dance"	All professional dancers
11 September 2015	Tomasz Szymuś's Orchestra	"Let's Get Loud"	Krzysztof Wieszczek & Agnieszka Kaczorowska (Season 16 champion)
18 September 2015	Ewelina Lisowska	"Nieodporny rozum"	—
25 September 2015	Tomasz Szymuś's Orchestra	"Samba de Janeiro"	Brazilian dancers
25 September 2015	Stefano Terrazzino and Michał Rudaś	"Beautiful Maria of My Soul"	Małgorzata Pieńkowska & Stefano Terrazzino
9 October 2015	Kombi	"Black and White"	Łukasz Kadziewicz & Agnieszka Kaczorowska
9 October 2015	Ira	"Wybacz"	Cleo & Jan Kliment
9 October 2015	Kasia Popowska	"Lecę tam"	Małgorzata Pieńkowska & Stefano Terrazzino
9 October 2015	Anna Wyszkoni	"Wiem, że jesteś tam"	Patryk Pniewski & Valeriya Zhuravlyova
9 October 2015	Tabb & Sound'n'Grace	"Na pewno"	Ewelina Lisowska & Tomasz Barański
9 October 2015	Patrycja Markowska	"Dzień za dniem"	Anna Cieślak & Rafał Maserak
9 October 2015	Rafał Brzozowski	"Magiczne słowa"	Artur Pontek & Natalia Głębocka
9 October 2015	Enej	"Kamień z napisem Love"	—
9 October 2015	Sound'n'Grace	"Nie bądź taki szybki Bill"	All professional dancers and celebrities
16 October 2015	Anna Naklab	"Supergirl"	girls with VOLT dance group
23 October 2015	Cleo	"I Have Nothing"	Cleo & Jan Kliment
23 October 2015	Cleo	"Sztorm"	VOLT dance group
30 October 2015	Tomasz Szymuś's Orchestra	"Libertango"	Anna Głogowska, Janja Lesar & Krzysztof Hulboj
6 November 2015	Tomasz Szymuś's Orchestra	"Hey Mama"	VOLT dance group
6 November 2015	VIDEO	"Ktoś nowy"	Ewelina Lisowska & Tomasz Barański
6 November 2015	Szymon Chodyniecki	"Sam na sam"	Cleo & Jan Kliment
6 November 2015	Antek Smykiewicz	"Pomimo burz"	Łukasz Kadziewicz & Agnieszka Kaczorowska
13 November 2015	Tomasz Szymuś's Orchestra	"Murder on the Dancefloor"	All professional dancers and celebrities
13 November 2015	Sławomir Uniatowski	"Always on My Mind"	Łukasz Kadziewicz & Agnieszka Kaczorowska
13 November 2015	Tomasz Szymuś's Orchestra	"The Final Countdown" "La Cumparsita" "Shape of My Heart" "Fever"	Valeriya Zhuravlyova & Przemysław Modrzyński and Marek Kosaty & Paulina Glazik
13 November 2015	Krzysztof Kiljański	"Hello"	Ewelina Lisowska & Tomasz Barański
13 November 2015	Zbigniew Wodecki	"Lubię wracać tam gdzie byłem"	—

== Rating figures ==
Date	Episode	Official rating 4+	Share 4+	Official rating 16–49	Share 16–49
11 September 2015	1	3 119 775	21.66%	—N/a	—N/a
18 September 2015	2	3 136 721	22.01%	—N/a	—N/a
25 September 2015	3	3 447 225	23.16%	—N/a	—N/a
2 October 2015	4	3 457 870	23.66%	—N/a	—N/a
9 October 2015	5	3 151 611	20.38%	—N/a	—N/a
16 October 2015	6	3 311 635	21.29%	—N/a	—N/a
23 October 2015	7	3 489 039	21.73%	—N/a	—N/a
30 October 2015	8	3 427 794	22.01%	—N/a	—N/a
6 November 2015	9	3 774 114	23.62%	—N/a	—N/a
13 November 2015	10	3 568 550	21.86%	—N/a	—N/a
Average	Fall 2015	3 383 995	22.12%	925 378	15.23%
