= Łukasz Kadziewicz =

Polish volleyball player (born 1980)

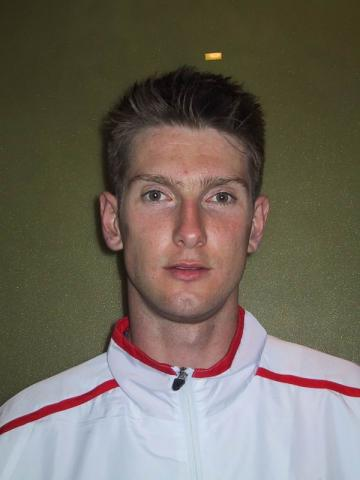

Personal information
- Nickname: Kadziu
- Nationality: Polish
- Born: 20 September 1980 (age 46) Dobre Miasto, Poland
- Height: 2.06 m (6 ft 9 in)

Volleyball information
- Position: Middle blocker

Career
- Years: Team
- 2000–2004 2004–2005 2005–2007 2007–2008 2008–2009 2009–2010 2010–2011 2011 2011–2012 2012 2012–2013 2013–2015: AZS Olsztyn; Gazprom-Ugra Surgut; Jastrzębski Węgiel; Sparkling Volley Milano; Trefl Gdańsk; Lokomotiv Belgorod; Gazprom-Ugra Surgut; Al Arabi Doha; AZS Olsztyn; Modena Volley; Shakhtar Soligorsk; Cuprum Lubin

National team
- Years: Team
- 2001–2009: Poland
Honours
Representing Poland
Men's volleyball
FIVB World Championship
Silver medal – second place	2006 Japan

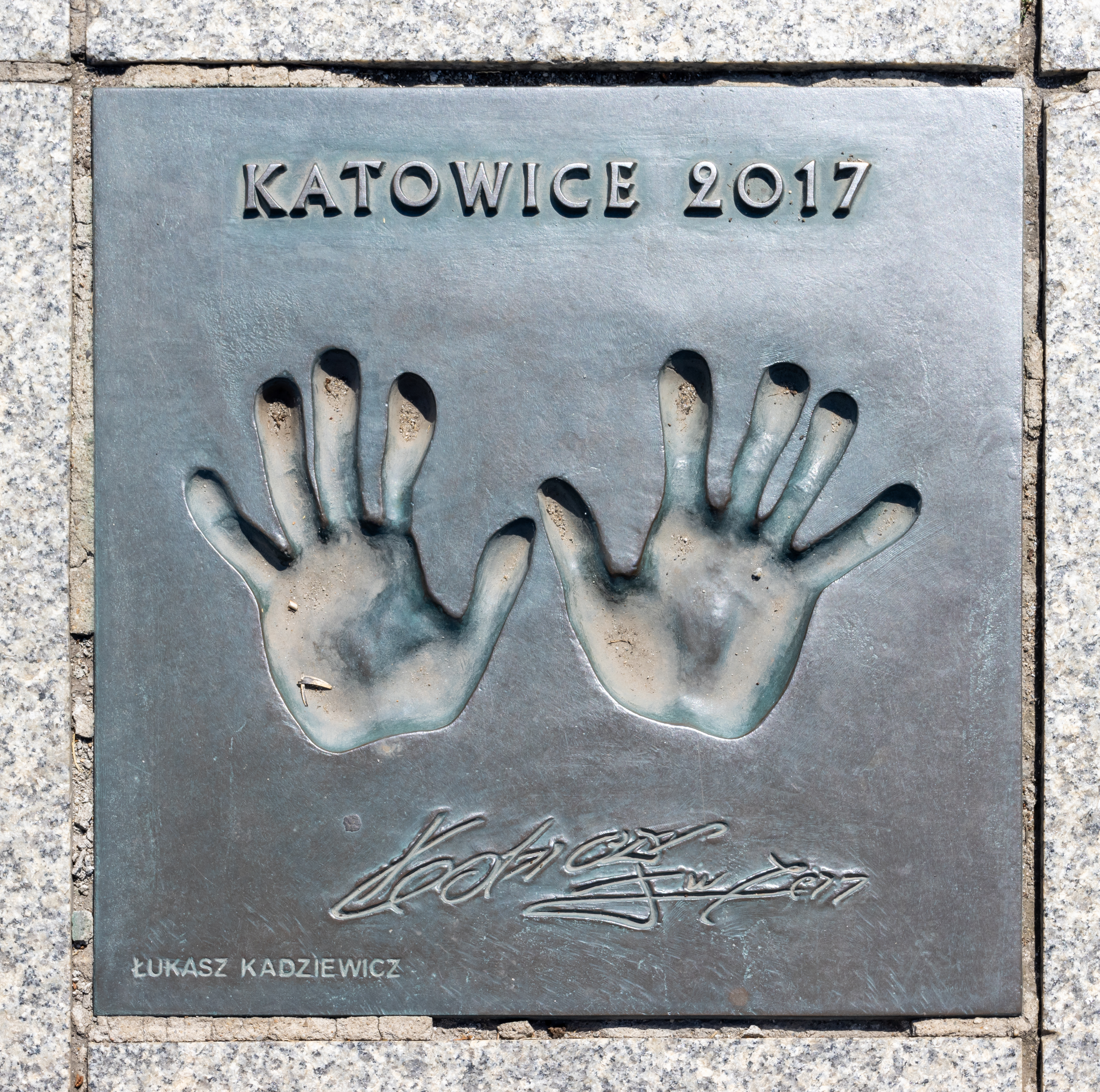
Hand prints and signature at the Avenue of Volleyball Stars, Katowice

Łukasz Kadziewicz (born 20 September 1980) is a Polish former professional volleyball player, a member of the Poland national team in 2001–2009. A participant of the Olympic Games (Athens 2004, Beijing 2008), and a silver medalist at the 2006 World Championship. He worked as a volleyball commentator for Polsat Sport.

== Personal life ==
Łukasz Kadziewicz was born in Dobre Miasto, Poland. He was married to Kamila. Their daughter, Amelia was born on 21 March 2006. Łukasz and Kamila divorced in 2008. He is married, for a second time, to Barbara (née Gołąb).

When Łukasz was a member of the Polish national team he created the "Kadziu Project". He filmed videos that showed how the Polish team prepared for matches and their lifestyle during tournaments (for example the Olympics in Beijing, 2008). When Kadziewicz ended his career in the national team, Krzysztof Ignaczak took up his idea, continuing this work under the name "Igłą Szyte". In 2013, Kadziewicz reactivated the "Kadziu Project", but instead of showing life in the national team, he now films interviews with other volleyball players and talks about his thoughts related to volleyball.

He took part in the 17th season of Polish version of Dancing with the Stars. He was partnered with the professional dancer Agnieszka Kaczorowska.

== Career ==
=== Clubs ===
In 2013, Kadziewicz moved to MKS Cuprum Lubin, which played in 1st league of Polish Volleyball League. Club promoted to PlusLiga and debuted in the match with Asseco Resovia Rzeszów on October 6, 2014. Kadziewicz is the captain of his current club. He decided to end up his career as player in 2015.

== Honours ==
=== Clubs ===
- National championships
  - 2003/2004 Polish Championship, with PZU AZS Olsztyn
  - 2005/2006 Polish Championship, with Jastrzębski Węgiel
  - 2006/2007 Polish Championship, with Jastrzębski Węgiel
  - 2009/2010 Russian Championship, with Lokomotiv Belgorod
  - 2012/2013 Belarusian Championship, with Shakhtar Soligorsk

=== Individual awards ===
- 2005: Polish Championship – Best Middle Blocker
- 2006: Polish Championship – Best Middle Blocker
- 2007: Polish Championship – Best Middle Blocker
- 2008: Polish Championship – Best Middle Blocker

=== State awards ===
- 2006: Gold Cross of Merit
