= Taniec z gwiazdami season 16 =

Taniec z gwiazdami
- Season 16
- Hosted by: Krzysztof Ibisz; Anna Głogowska
- Judges: Andrzej Grabowski; Iwona Pavlović; Beata Tyszkiewicz; Michał Malitowski
- Celebrity winner: Krzysztof Wieszczek
- Professional winner: Agnieszka Kaczorowska
- No. of episodes: 11

Release
- Original network: Polsat
- Original release: 6 March – 22 May 2015

Season chronology
- ← Previous; 15 Next → 17

The 16th season of Taniec z gwiazdami, the Polish edition of Dancing With the Stars, started on 6 March 2015. This is the third season aired on Polsat. Krzysztof Ibisz and Anna Głogowska returned as hosts and Beata Tyszkiewicz, Iwona Pavlović, Michał Malitowski and Andrzej Grabowski returned as judges.

On 22 May, Krzysztof Wieszczek and his partner Agnieszka Kaczorowska were crowned the champions.

== Couples ==
Celebrity	Occupation	Professional partner	Status
Wojciech Brzozowski	Windsurfer	Paulina Janicka	Eliminated 1st on 6 March 2015
Marcin Najman	Boxer, Kickboxer and MMA fighter	Hanna Żudziewicz	Eliminated 2nd on 13 March 2015
Norbi	Singer and radio-television presenter	Nina Tyrka	Eliminated 3rd on 20 March 2015
Kamila Szczawińska	Model	Robert Kochanek	Eliminated 4th on 27 March 2015
Łukasz Garlicki	Actor and theatre director	Magdalena Soszyńska-Michno	Eliminated 5th on 10 April 2015
Grzegorz Łapanowski	Cook and Top Chef judge	Valeriya Zhuravlyova; Agnieszka Kaczorowska (Week 6)	Eliminated 6th on 24 April 2015
Ada Fijał	Actress and singer	Krzysztof Hulboj; Jan Kliment (Week 6)	Eliminated 7th on 24 April 2015
Sylwia Juszczak-Arnesen	Film and television actress	Kamil Kuroczko; Krzysztof Hulboj (Week 6)	Eliminated 8th on 1 May 2015
Ewa Kasprzyk	Film and television actress	Jan Kliment; Kamil Kuroczko (Week 6)	Eliminated 9th on 8 May 2015
Julia Pogrebińska	Pierwsza miłość actress	Rafał Maserak; Tomasz Barański (Week 6)	Third place on 15 May 2015
Tatiana Okupnik	Former Blue Café singer and television presenter	Tomasz Barański; Rafał Maserak (Week 6)	Runners-up on 22 May 2015
Krzysztof Wieszczek	Na Wspólnej actor	Agnieszka Kaczorowska; Valeriya Zhuravlyova (Week 6)	Winners on 22 May 2015

== Scores ==
Couple	Place	1	2	3	4	5	6	7	6+7	8	9	10	11
Krzysztof & Agnieszka	1	35	35	27	33	26+37=63‡	34	33+5=38	72	38†	33+39=72	40+33+40=113‡	39+39+40=118‡
Tatiana & Tomasz	2	39†	40†	37	39†	36+37=73	40†	38+3=41	81	35+39=74	38+38=76	38+40+36=114†	39+40+40=119†
Julia & Rafał	3	33	36	39†	38	32+38=70	37	40+6=46†	83†	38+37=75†	39+38=77†	40+36+38=114†	
Ewa & Jan	4	27	27	25	26	31+37=68	32	25+1=26‡	58‡	30+32=62‡	30+29=59‡		
Sylwia & Kamil	5	26	31	31	28	35+37=72	35	35+4=39	74	34+35=69			
Ada & Krzysztof	6	25	27	30	30	39+38=77†	34	34+2=36	70				
Grzegorz & Valeriya	7	27	37	30	27	28+38=66	29‡	29	58‡				
Łukasz & Magdalena	8	34	28	29	34	32+38=70							
Kamila & Robert	9	27	31	27	25‡								
Norbi & Nina	10	13‡	27	20‡									
Marcin & Hanna	11	28	26‡										
Wojciech & Paulina	12	25											

Red numbers indicate the lowest score for each week.
Green numbers indicate the highest score for each week.
indicates the couple eliminated that week.
indicates the returning couple that finished in the bottom two.
indicates the returning couple that was the last to be called safe.
indicates the couple saved from elimination by immunity
indicates the winning couple.
indicates the runner-up.
indicates the couple in third place.

Notes

Week 1: Tatiana Okupnik scored 39 out of 40 on her first dance (Rumba). It was the highest score ever in Week 1. Agnieszka Sienkiewicz and Anna Wyszkoni also got 39 points in Week 1 in Season 15. Norbi got the lowest score in history of the show, scoring 13 out of 40 for his Cha-cha-cha. It was also the lowest score ever for Cha-cha-cha. Michał Szpak (Week 9 & 10) and Zbigniew Urbański (Week 1) also got 13 points in Season 13. Wojciech & Paulina were eliminated despite being 12 points from the bottom.

Week 2: Tatiana Okupnik received the first perfect score of the season for her Cha-cha-cha. It was the highest score ever in Week 2. Marcin Najman got 26 points for his Rumba, making it the lowest score of the week. Marcin & Hanna were eliminated.

Week 3: All couples danced to songs from movies. Julia Pogrebińska scored 39 out of 40 for her Jive, making it the highest score in this episode. Norbi got 20 points for his Jive, making it the lowest score of the week. Norbi & Nina were eliminated.

Week 4: Tatiana Okupnik scored 39 out of 40 for her Jive, making it the highest score in this episode. Kamila Szczawińska got 25 points for her Rumba, making it the lowest score of the week. Kamila & Robert were eliminated.

Week 5: All couples danced to national style. Ada Fijał scored 39 out of 40 for her Viennese Waltz, making it the highest score in this episode. Krzysztof Wieszczek got 26 points for his Cha-cha-cha, making it the lowest score of the week. There were also two team dances. The teams were chosen by the winner and runner-up couples in 4th episode. Tatiana's Team received 37 out of 40 for their Taniec Góralski. Julia's Team received 38 out of 40 for their Krakowiak. Łukasz & Magdalena were eliminated despite being 6 points from the bottom.

Week 6: Tatiana Okupnik received her second perfect score for the Quickstep. Grzegorz Łapanowski got 29 points for his Foxtrot, making it the lowest score of the week. There was no elimination.

Week 7: Julia Pogrebińska received her first perfect score for her Paso Doble. Ewa Kasprzyk got 25 points for her Charleston, making it the lowest score of the week. There was also Rock and Roll marathon. Julia Pogrebińska scored 6 out of 6 in the marathon. Grzegorz & Valeriya were eliminated despite being 4 points from the bottom. Ada & Krzysztof were also eliminated despite being 10 points from the bottom.

Week 8: Tatiana Okupnik scored 39 out of 40 for her Rumba, making it the highest score in this episode. Ewa Kasprzyk got 30 points for her Broadway, making it the lowest score of the week. Sylwia & Kamil were eliminated despite being 7 points from the bottom.

Week 9: Krzysztof Wieszczek scored 39 out of 40 for his Waltz, making it the highest score in this episode. Julia Pogrebińska also scored 39 out of 40 for her Freestyle. Ewa Kasprzyk got 29 points for her Paso Doble, making it the lowest score of the week. Ewa & Jan were eliminated.

Week 10: Julia Pogrebińska received her second perfect score for the Tango. Tatiana Okupnik received her third perfect score for Contemporary. Krzysztof Wieszczek received his 1st and 2nd perfect score for the Foxtrot and Medley. Krzysztof Wieszczek got 33 points for his Jive, making it the lowest score of the week. Julia & Rafał were eliminated despite being 1 point from the bottom.

Week 11: Both couples had to perform three dances: their favorite dance, judges's choice dance and a Showdance. Tatiana Okupnik received her 4th and 5th perfect score for the Samba and Showdance. Krzysztof Wieszczek received his 3rd perfect score for the Viennese Waltz. Krzysztof & Agnieszka won the competition. This is the 10th time the winner was not on the first place according to the judges' scoreboard. Krzysztof Wieszczek became the 5th man in history to win the program since Kacper Kuszewski won Season 13 of the show.

== Average score chart ==
This table only counts for dances scored on a traditional 40-points scale.

Rank by average	Place	Couple	Total points	Number of dances	Average
1	2	Tatiana & Tomasz	689	18	38.3
2	3	Julia & Rafał	559	15	37.3
3	1	Krzysztof & Agnieszka	601	17	35.4
4	5	Sylwia & Kamil	327	10	32.7
5	8	Łukasz & Magdalena	195	6	32.5
6	6	Ada & Krzysztof	257	8	32.1
7	7	Grzegorz & Valeriya	245	8	30.6
8	4	Ewa & Jan	351	12	29.3
9	9	Kamila & Robert	110	4	27.5
10	11	Marcin & Hanna	54	2	27.0
11	12	Wojciech & Paulina	25	1	25.0
12	10	Norbi & Nina	60	3	20.0

== Highest and lowest scoring performances ==
The best and worst performances in each dance according to the judges' 40-point scale are as follows:

Dance	Best dancer(s)	Highest score	Worst dancer(s)	Lowest score
Samba	Tatiana Okupnik	40	Ada Fijał	25
Jive	Julia Pogrebińska; Tatiana Okupnik	39	Norbi	20
Tango	Julia Pogrebińska	40	Ewa Kasprzyk	27
Cha-cha-cha	Tatiana Okupnik	40	Norbi	13
Contemporary	Tatiana Okupnik	40	Sylwia Juszczak-Arnesen	31
Quickstep	Tatiana Okupnik	40	Wojciech Brzozowski	25
Foxtrot	Krzysztof Wieszczek	40	Ewa Kasprzyk	25
Salsa	Łukasz Garlicki	32	Sylwia Juszczak-Arnesen	26
Viennese Waltz	Krzysztof Wieszczek	40	Kamila Szczawińska	27
Paso Doble	Julia Pogrebińska	40	Kamila Szczawińska; Krzysztof Wieszczek	27
Waltz	Krzysztof Wieszczek	39	Grzegorz Łapanowski	30
Rumba	Tatiana Okupnik; Krzysztof Wieszczek	39	Kamila Szczawińska	25
American Smooth	Julia Pogrebińska	36		
Jazz	Krzysztof Wieszczek	38	Kamila Szczawińska	31
Swing	Sylwia Juszczak-Arnesen	35	Norbi	27
Charleston	Julia Pogrebińska	38	Ewa Kasprzyk	25
Uncommon styles	Julia Pogrebińska (Dancehall)	38	Ewa Kasprzyk (Broadway)	30
Team Dance	Julia Pogrebińska; Grzegorz Łapanowski; Łukasz Garlicki; Ada Fijał	38	Tatiana Okupnik; Ewa Kasprzyk; Krzysztof Wieszczek; Sylwia Juszczak-Arnesen	37
Rock and Roll Marathon	Julia Pogrebińska	6	Ewa Kasprzyk	1
Freestyle	Julia Pogrebińska	39	Ewa Kasprzyk	30
Medley	Krzysztof Wieszczek (Tango, Cha-cha-cha, Rumba)	40	Tatiana Okupnik (Cha-cha-cha, Viennese Waltz, Jive)	36
Showdance	Tatiana Okupnik	40	Krzysztof Wieszczek	39

== Couples' highest and lowest scoring dances ==
According to the traditional 40-point scale:

Couples	Highest scoring dance(s)	Lowest scoring dance(s)
Krzysztof & Agnieszka	Foxtrot, Medley, Viennese Waltz (40)	Cha-cha-cha (26)
Tatiana & Tomasz	Cha-cha-cha, Quickstep, Contemporary, Showdance, Samba (40)	Hip-hop (35)
Julia & Rafał	Paso Doble, Tango (40)	Cha-cha-cha (32)
Ewa & Jan	Team Dance (37)	Foxtrot, Charleston (25)
Sylwia & Kamil	Team Dance (37)	Salsa (26)
Ada & Krzysztof	Viennese Waltz (39)	Samba (25)
Grzegorz & Valeriya	Team Dance (38)	Jive, Salsa (27)
Łukasz & Magdalena	Team Dance (38)	Jive (28)
Kamila & Robert	Jazz (31)	Rumba (25)
Norbi & Nina	Swing (27)	Cha-cha-cha (13)
Marcin & Hanna	Viennese Waltz (28)	Rumba (26)
Wojciech & Paulina	Quickstep (25)	Quickstep (25)

== Weekly scores ==
Unless indicated otherwise, individual judges scores in the charts below (given in parentheses) are listed in this order from left to right: Andrzej Grabowski, Iwona Pavlović, Beata Tyszkiewicz and Michał Malitowski.

=== Week 1: Season Premiere ===
Running order

Couple	Score	Dance	Music	Result
Ada & Krzysztof	25 (7,5,8,5)	Samba	"La Bamba"—Ritchie Valens	Last to be called safe
Grzegorz & Valeriya	27 (8,5,8,6)	Jive	"Shake It Off"—Taylor Swift	Safe
Ewa & Jan	27 (8,4,9,6)	Tango	"Por una Cabeza"—Carlos Gardel	Safe
Norbi & Nina	13 (5,2,3,3)	Cha-cha-cha	"Kobiety są gorące"—Norbi	Safe
Julia & Rafał	33 (9,8,8,8)	Contemporary	"Chandelier"—Sia	Safe
Wojciech & Paulina	25 (7,6,6,6)	Quickstep	"Nie stało się nic"—Wilki	Eliminated
Krzysztof & Agnieszka	35 (10,8,10,7)	Foxtrot	"Cheek to Cheek"—Fred Astaire	Safe
Sylwia & Kamil	26 (8,5,8,5)	Salsa	"María"—Ricky Martin	Safe
Marcin & Hanna	28 (7,6,8,7)	Viennese Waltz	"Za szkłem"—Bracia	Safe
Kamila & Robert	27 (9,3,10,5)	Paso Doble	"Dernière danse"—Indila	Safe
Łukasz & Magdalena	34 (10,7,10,7)	Waltz	"Can You Feel the Love Tonight"—Elton John	Safe
Tatiana & Tomasz	39 (10,10,10,9)	Rumba	"It Must Have Been Love"—Roxette	Safe

=== Week 2: Personal Stories ===
Individual judges scores in the charts below (given in parentheses) are listed in this order from left to right: Andrzej Grabowski, Iwona Pavlović, Beata Tyszkiewicz and Robert Kupisz.

Running order

Couple	Score	Dance	Music	Result
Julia & Rafał	36 (10,8,10,8)	American Smooth	"Feeling Good"—Nina Simone	Safe
Ewa & Jan	27 (9,4,8,6)	Cha-cha-cha	"Sway"—Dean Martin	Safe
Marcin & Hanna	26 (9,3,8,6)	Rumba	"You're My Heart, You're My Soul"—Modern Talking	Eliminated
Kamila & Robert	31 (9,7,8,7)	Jazz	"Use Somebody"—Kings of Leon	Safe
Łukasz & Magdalena	28 (9,5,8,6)	Jive	"Rehab"—Amy Winehouse	Safe
Ada & Krzysztof	27 (8,5,9,5)	Cha-cha-cha	"Get Lucky"—Daft Punk featuring Pharrell Williams	Safe
Grzegorz & Valeriya	37 (10,8,10,9)	Cha-cha-cha	"Cosmic Girl"—Jamiroquai	Safe
Sylwia & Kamil	31 (9,6,8,8)	Contemporary	"Stay with Me"—Sam Smith	Last to be called safe
Norbi & Nina	27 (8,5,9,5)	Swing	"Jak nie my to kto"—Mrozu & Tomson	Safe
Tatiana & Tomasz	40 (10,10,10,10)	Cha-cha-cha	"Lady (Hear Me Tonight)"—Modjo	Safe
Krzysztof & Agnieszka	35 (10,9,9,7)	Rumba	"November Rain"—Guns N' Roses	Safe

=== Week 3: Movie Week ===
Running order

Couple	Score	Dance	Music	Movie	Result
Krzysztof & Agnieszka	27 (8,5,8,6)	Paso Doble	"Battle Without Honor or Humanity"—Tomoyasu Hotei "Don't Let Me Be Misunderstood"—The Animals	Kill Bill	Safe
Kamila & Robert	27 (9,5,8,5)	Viennese Waltz	"Noce i dnie"—Waldemar Kazanecki	Nights and Days	Safe
Norbi & Nina	20 (7,2,7,4)	Jive	"Mah Nà Mah Nà"—Piero Umiliani	The Muppets	Eliminated
Sylwia & Kamil	31 (9,7,9,6)	Jive	"You Never Can Tell"—Chuck Berry	Pulp Fiction	Safe
Ewa & Jan	25 (8,3,9,5)	Foxtrot	"As Time Goes By"—Dooley Wilson	Casablanca	Safe
Łukasz & Magdalena	29 (8,7,9,5)	Cha-cha-cha	"Oh, Pretty Woman"—Roy Orbison	Pretty Woman	Last to be called safe
Ada & Krzysztof	30 (9,6,9,6)	Rumba	"Skyfall"—Adele	Skyfall	Safe
Tatiana & Tomasz	37 (10,9,10,8)	Paso Doble	"Cancion del Mariachi"—Antonio Banderas	Desperado	Safe
Grzegorz & Valeriya	30 (9,6,9,6)	Waltz	"Dumka na dwa serca"—Edyta Górniak & Mieczysław Szcześniak	With Fire and Sword	Safe
Julia & Rafał	39 (10,10,10,9)	Jive	"Everybody Needs Somebody to Love"—Blues Brothers	The Blues Brothers	Safe

=== Week 4: Pro Dancers ===
Running order

Couple	Score	Dance	Music	Result
Tatiana & Tomasz	39 (10,10,10,9)	Jive	"All About That Bass"—Meghan Trainor	Winner
Grzegorz & Valeriya	27 (9,5,7,6)	Salsa	"Bailando"—Enrique Iglesias featuring Descemer Bueno, Gente De Zona	Last to be called safe
Krzysztof & Agnieszka	33 (9,8,9,7)	Contemporary	"Say You Love Me"—Jessie Ware	Safe
Ada & Krzysztof	30 (9,7,7,7)	Quickstep	"I'm Still Standing"—Elton John	Safe
Sylwia & Kamil	28 (8,6,8,6)	Cha-cha-cha	"I Wanna Dance with Somebody (Who Loves Me)"—Whitney Houston	Safe
Kamila & Robert	25 (8,4,8,5)	Rumba	"Thinking Out Loud"—Ed Sheeran	Eliminated
Julia & Rafał	38 (10,9,10,9)	Charleston	"Entrance of the Gladiators"—Julius Fučík	Runner-up
Łukasz & Magdalena	34 (10,7,9,8)	Tango	"Wstaję"—Grzegorz Hyży & TABB	Safe
Ewa & Jan	26 (8,4,9,5)	Rumba	"Woman in Love"—Barbra Streisand	Safe

=== Week 5: Around the World ===
The teams were chosen by the winner and runner-up couples in 4th episode – Tatiana & Tomasz and Julia & Rafał.

Running order

Couple	Score	Dance	Country	Music	Result
Łukasz & Magdalena	32 (10,7,9,6)	Salsa	Mexico	"La Cucaracha"—Gipsy Kings	Eliminated
Julia & Rafał	32 (9,8,9,6)	Cha-cha-cha	Balkans	"Bałkanica"—Piersi	Safe
Ada & Krzysztof	39 (10,10,10,9)	Viennese Waltz	Austria	"The Blue Danube"—Johann Strauss II	Safe
Grzegorz & Valeriya	28 (9,5,9,5)	Samba	Turkey	"Şımarık"—Tarkan	Last to be called safe
Tatiana & Tomasz	36 (10,9,10,7)	Tango	France	"Et si tu n'existais pas"—Joe Dassin	Safe
Krzysztof & Agnieszka	26 (8,6,8,4)	Cha-cha-cha	Russia	"Belye rozy"—Yuri Shatunov	Safe
Ewa & Jan	31 (10,5,9,7)	Quickstep	Czech Republic	"Malovaný džbánku"—Helena Vondráčková	Safe
Sylwia & Kamil	35 (10,8,9,8)	Foxtrot	Italy	"L'Italiano"—Toto Cutugno	Safe
Julia & Rafał; Grzegorz & Valeriya; Łukasz & Magdalena; Ada & Krzysztof	38 (10,10,10,8)	Krakowiak (Team Czerstwe Precle)	Poland	"Albośmy to jacy tacy"	
Tatiana & Tomasz; Ewa & Jan; Krzysztof & Agnieszka; Sylwia & Kamil	37 (10,8,10,9)	Taniec góralski (Team Okupki)	Poland	"Hej, bystra woda"	

=== Week 6: Partners Switch – Up ===
Running order

Couple	Score	Dance	Music	Result
Julia & Tomasz	37 (10,9,10,8)	Samba	"Whenever, Wherever"—Shakira	Safe
Ada & Jan	34 (10,8,9,7)	Jive	"Wake Me Up Before You Go-Go"—Wham!	Bottom two
Krzysztof & Valeriya	34 (10,8,9,7)	Waltz	"Jej portret"—Bogusław Mec	Safe
Sylwia & Krzysztof	35 (10,7,10,8)	Rumba	"I Want to Know What Love Is"—Foreigner	Bottom two
Grzegorz & Agnieszka	29 (9,5,9,6)	Foxtrot	"Can't Take My Eyes Off You"—Frankie Valli	Safe
Ewa & Kamil	32 (9,6,10,7)	Paso Doble	"Les Toreadors"—Georges Bizet from Carmen	Safe
Tatiana & Rafał	40 (10,10,10,10)	Quickstep	"Valerie"—Mark Ronson featuring Amy Winehouse	Safe

=== Week 7: Marathon Week ===
Running order

Couple	Score	Dance	Music	Result
Sylwia & Kamil	35 (10,8,10,7)	Quickstep	"Umbrella"—The Baseballs	Safe
Grzegorz & Valeriya	29 (9,5,9,6)	Rumba	"Killing Me Softly with His Song"—Roberta Flack	1st Eliminated
Ewa & Jan	25 (8,4,8,5)	Charleston	"Puttin' on the Ritz"—Fred Astaire	Last to be called safe
Tatiana & Tomasz	38 (10,10,10,8)	Viennese Waltz	"Ostatni"—Edyta Bartosiewicz	Safe
Julia & Rafał	40 (10,10,10,10)	Paso Doble	"Co mi Panie dasz?"—Bajm	Safe
Ada & Krzysztof	34 (10,7,9,8)	Contemporary	"Apologize"—OneRepublic	2nd Eliminated
Krzysztof & Agnieszka	33 (10,7,8,8)	Tango	"El Tango de Roxanne"—from Moulin Rouge!	Safe
Julia & Rafał; Krzysztof & Agnieszka; Sylwia & Kamil; Tatiana & Tomasz; Ada & Krzysztof; Ewa & Jan	6; 5; 4; 3; 2; 1	Rock and Roll	"Rock and Roll Music"—The Beatles	

=== Week 8: New Dance Styles ===
Running order

Couple	Score	Dance	Music	Result
Ewa & Jan	30 (9,6,9,6)	Broadway	"Willkommen"—from Cabaret	Last to be called safe
Ewa & Jan	32 (9,7,9,7)	Cha-cha-cha	"Oye Como Va"—Tito Puente	Last to be called safe
Tatiana & Tomasz	35 (10,7,10,8)	Hip-hop	"U Can't Touch This"—MC Hammer	Safe
Tatiana & Tomasz	39 (10,10,10,9)	Rumba	"Fields of Gold"—Sting	Safe
Sylwia & Kamil	34 (10,8,9,7)	Disco	"I'm So Excited"—The Pointer Sisters	Eliminated
Sylwia & Kamil	35 (10,8,10,7)	Swing	"My Baby Just Cares for Me"—Nina Simone	Eliminated
Krzysztof & Agnieszka	38 (10,9,10,9)	Jazz	"Try"—Pink	Safe (Immunity)
Julia & Rafał	38 (10,9,10,9)	Dancehall	"Get Busy"—Sean Paul	Safe
Julia & Rafał	37 (10,9,10,8)	Foxtrot	"L-O-V-E"—Nat King Cole	Safe

=== Week 9: Dynamic Duos ===
Running order

Couple	Score	Dance	Music	As	Result
Krzysztof & Agnieszka	33 (10,8,9,6)	Freestyle	"Deszcze niespokojne"—Edmund Fetting	Janek & Marusia from "Czterej pancerni i pies"	Last to be called safe
Krzysztof & Agnieszka	39 (10,9,10,10)	Waltz	"Jej portret"—Bogusław Mec	—	Last to be called safe
Julia & Rafał	39 (10,10,10,9)	Freestyle	"Love (Theme From Romeo & Juliet)"—André Rieu	Romeo & Juliet from "Romeo and Juliet"	Safe
Julia & Rafał	38 (10,9,10,9)	Samba	"Whenever, Wherever"—Shakira	—	Safe
Ewa & Jan	30 (8,6,10,6)	Freestyle	"(Meet) The Flintstones"—The B-52's	Fred & Wilma from "The Flintstones"	Eliminated
Ewa & Jan	29 (8,5,10,6)	Paso Doble	"Les Toreadors"—Georges Bizet from Carmen	—	Eliminated
Tatiana & Tomasz	38 (10,9,10,9)	Freestyle	"To nie ja!"—Edyta Górniak	Adam & Eve	Safe
Tatiana & Tomasz	38 (10,9,10,9)	Quickstep	"Valerie"—Mark Ronson featuring Amy Winehouse	—	Safe

=== Week 10: Trio Challenge (Semifinal) ===
Running order

Couple (Trio Dance Partner)	Score	Dance	Music	Result
Krzysztof & Agnieszka (Nina Tyrka)	40 (10,10,10,10)	Foxtrot	"I Wanna Be Loved by You"—Marilyn Monroe	Safe
Krzysztof & Agnieszka (Nina Tyrka)	33 (9,8,9,7)	Jive	"Dach"—Tabb & Sound'n'Grace	Safe
Krzysztof & Agnieszka (Nina Tyrka)	40 (10,10,10,10)	Tango; Cha-cha-cha; Rumba	"Santa Maria (Del Buen Ayre)"—Gotan Project "Counting Stars"—OneRepublic "Bésame Mucho"—Lucho Gatica	Safe
Julia & Rafał (Robert Kochanek)	40 (10,10,10,10)	Tango	"I've Seen That Face Before (Libertango)"—Grace Jones	Eliminated
Julia & Rafał (Robert Kochanek)	36 (9,9,10,8)	Quickstep	"Walking on Sunshine"—Katrina and the Waves	Eliminated
Julia & Rafał (Robert Kochanek)	38 (10,10,10,8)	Jive; Foxtrot; Cha-cha-cha	"Wake Me Up Before You Go-Go"—Wham! "Fever"—Peggy Lee "Blurred Lines"—Robin Thicke featuring T.I. and Pharrell Williams	Eliminated
Tatiana & Tomasz (Krzysztof Hulboj)	38 (10,9,10,9)	Paso Doble	"España cañí"—André Rieu	Last to be called safe
Tatiana & Tomasz (Krzysztof Hulboj)	40 (10,10,10,10)	Contemporary	"Rolling in the Deep"—Adele	Last to be called safe
Tatiana & Tomasz (Krzysztof Hulboj)	36 (10,8,10,8)	Cha-cha-cha; Viennese Waltz; Jive	"Waiting for Tonight"—Jennifer Lopez "Iris"—Goo Goo Dolls "Happy"—Pharrell Williams	Last to be called safe

=== Week 11: Season Finale ===
Running order

Couple	Score	Dance	Music	Result
Tatiana & Tomasz	39 (10,10,10,9)	Tango	"Et si tu n'existais pas"—Joe Dassin	Runners-up
Tatiana & Tomasz	40 (10,10,10,10)	Showdance	"She's Like The Wind"—Patrick Swayze featuring Wendy Fraser "(I've Had) The Time of My Life"—Bill Medley & Jennifer Warnes	Runners-up
Tatiana & Tomasz	40 (10,10,10,10)	Samba	"Conga"—Miami Sound Machine	Runners-up
Krzysztof & Agnieszka	39 (10,9,10,10)	Rumba	"November Rain"—Guns N' Roses	Winners
Krzysztof & Agnieszka	39 (10,10,10,9)	Showdance	"Forrest Gump Theme"—Alan Silvestri	Winners
Krzysztof & Agnieszka	40 (10,10,10,10)	Viennese Waltz	"When a Man Loves a Woman"—Percy Sledge	Winners

Other Dances

Couple	Dance	Music
Wojciech & Paulina; Marcin & Janja; Norbi & Nina	Quickstep; Viennese Waltz; Swing	"Nie stało się nic"—Wilki "Za szkłem"—Bracia "Jak nie my to kto"—Mrozu & Tomson
Kamila & Robert; Łukasz & Magdalena; Grzegorz & Valeriya; Ada & Krzysztof	Rumba; Cha-Cha-Cha; Salsa; Contemporary	"Thinking Out Loud"—Ed Sheeran "Oh, Pretty Woman"—Roy Orbison "Bailando"—Enrique Iglesias featuring Descemer Bueno, Gente De Zona "Apologize"—OneRepublic
Sylwia & Kamil; Ewa & Jan; Julia & Rafał	Quickstep; Rumba; Jive	"Umbrella"—The Baseballs "Woman in Love"—Barbra Streisand "Everybody Needs Somebody to Love"—Blues Brothers
Stefano Terrazzino, Aneta Zając & Agnieszka Sienkiewicz (Seasons 14 and 15 champions)	Showdance	"Say Something"—A Great Big World ft. Christina Aguilera "Pirates of the Caribbean Theme"—from Pirates of the Caribbean

== Dance chart ==
The celebrities and professional partners danced one of these routines for each corresponding week:

- Week 1 (Season Premiere): Cha-cha-cha, Waltz, Rumba, Quickstep, Jive, Tango, Foxtrot, Paso Doble, Samba, Salsa, Viennese Waltz, Contemporary
- Week 2 (Personal Story Night): One unlearned dance (introducing Jazz, Swing, American Smooth)
- Week 3 (Movie Night): One unlearned dance
- Week 4 (Pro Dancers Night): One unlearned dance (introducing Charleston)
- Week 5 (Around the World Night): One unlearned dance and Team Dance Freestyle
- Week 6 (Switch-Up Night): One unlearned dance
- Week 7 (Marathon Night): One unlearned dance and Rock and Roll marathon
- Week 8 (New Dance Styles Special): One repeated dance and one unlearned uncommon dance (Broadway, Dancehall, Hip-hop, Disco)
- Week 9 (Dynamic Duos Night): One repeated dance from week 6 and Freestyle
- Week 10 (Semifinal: Trio Challenge): One unlearned dance (trio dances), one repeated dance and improvised medley
- Week 11 (Season Finale): Judges' choice, Showdance and unlearned dance.

Couple	1	2	3	4	5		6	7		8		9		10			11		
Krzysztof & Agnieszka	Foxtrot	Rumba	Paso Doble	Contemporary	Cha-cha-cha	Taniec Góralski (Team Okupki)	Waltz (Krzysztof & Valeriya)	Tango	Rock and Roll; Marathon	Jazz	- (Immunity)	Freestyle	Waltz	Foxtrot	Jive	Tango; Cha-cha-cha; Rumba	Rumba	Showdance	Viennese Waltz
Tatiana & Tomasz	Rumba	Cha-cha-cha	Paso Doble	Jive	Tango	Taniec Góralski (Team Okupki)	Quickstep (Tatiana & Rafał)	Viennese Waltz	Rock and Roll; Marathon	Hip-hop	Rumba	Freestyle	Quickstep	Paso Doble	Contemporary	Cha-cha-cha; Viennese Waltz; Jive	Tango	Showdance	Samba
Julia & Rafał	Contemporary	American Smooth	Jive	Charleston	Cha-cha-cha	Krakowiak (Team Czerstwe Precle)	Samba (Julia & Tomasz)	Paso Doble	Rock and Roll; Marathon	Dancehall	Foxtrot	Freestyle	Samba	Tango	Quickstep	Jive; Foxtrot; Cha-cha-cha			Jive
Ewa & Jan	Tango	Cha-cha-cha	Foxtrot	Rumba	Quickstep	Taniec Góralski (Team Okupki)	Paso Doble (Ewa & Kamil)	Charleston	Rock and Roll; Marathon	Broadway	Cha-cha-cha	Freestyle	Paso Doble						Rumba
Sylwia & Kamil	Salsa	Contemporary	Jive	Cha-cha-cha	Foxtrot	Taniec Góralski (Team Okupki)	Rumba (Sylwia & Krzysztof)	Quickstep	Rock and Roll; Marathon	Disco	Swing								Quickstep
Ada & Krzysztof	Samba	Cha-cha-cha	Rumba	Quickstep	Viennese Waltz	Krakowiak (Team Czerstwe Precle)	Jive (Ada & Jan)	Contemporary	Rock and Roll; Marathon										Contemporary
Grzegorz & Valeriya	Jive	Cha-cha-cha	Waltz	Salsa	Samba	Krakowiak (Team Czerstwe Precle)	Foxtrot (Grzegorz & Agnieszka)	Rumba											Salsa
Łukasz & Magdalena	Waltz	Jive	Cha-cha-cha	Tango	Salsa	Krakowiak (Team Czerstwe Precle)													Cha-cha-cha
Kamila & Robert	Paso Doble	Jazz	Viennese Waltz	Rumba															Rumba
Norbi & Nina	Cha-cha-cha	Swing	Jive																Swing
Marcin & Hanna	Viennese Waltz	Rumba																	Viennese Waltz
Wojciech & Paulina	Quickstep																		Quickstep

Highest scoring dance
Lowest scoring dance
Performed, but not scored

== Call-out order ==
Order	Week 1	Week 2	Week 3	Week 4	Week 5	Week 6+7	Week 8	Week 9	Week 10	Week 11
1	Krzysztof & Agnieszka	Tatiana & Tomasz	Julia & Rafał	Tatiana & Tomasz	Tatiana & Tomasz	Julia & Rafał	Krzysztof & Agnieszka	Julia & Rafał	Krzysztof & Agnieszka	Krzysztof & Agnieszka
2	Norbi & Nina	Krzysztof & Agnieszka	Ada & Krzysztof	Julia & Rafał	Ewa & Jan	Krzysztof & Agnieszka	Julia & Rafał	Tatiana & Tomasz	Tatiana & Tomasz	Tatiana & Tomasz
3	Julia & Rafał	Kamila & Robert	Tatiana & Tomasz	Krzysztof & Agnieszka	Ada & Krzysztof	Tatiana & Tomasz	Tatiana & Tomasz	Krzysztof & Agnieszka	Julia & Rafał	
4	Ewa & Jan	Ewa & Jan	Sylwia & Kamil	Łukasz & Magdalena	Julia & Rafał	Sylwia & Kamil	Ewa & Jan	Ewa & Jan		
5	Tatiana & Tomasz	Julia & Rafał	Grzegorz & Valeriya	Ada & Krzysztof	Sylwia & Kamil	Ewa & Jan	Sylwia & Kamil			
6	Grzegorz & Valeriya	Grzegorz & Valeriya	Kamila & Robert	Ewa & Jan	Krzysztof & Agnieszka	Ada & Krzysztof				
7	Kamila & Robert	Ada & Krzysztof	Ewa & Jan	Sylwia & Kamil	Grzegorz & Valeriya	Grzegorz & Valeriya				
8	Łukasz & Magdalena	Norbi & Nina	Krzysztof & Agnieszka	Grzegorz & Valeriya	Łukasz & Magdalena					
9	Marcin & Hanna	Łukasz & Magdalena	Łukasz & Magdalena	Kamila & Robert						
10	Sylwia & Kamil	Sylwia & Kamil	Norbi & Nina							
11	Ada & Krzysztof	Marcin & Hanna								
12	Wojciech & Paulina									

This couple came in first place with the judges.
This couple came in last place with the judges.
This couple came in last place with the judges and was eliminated.
This couple was eliminated.
This couple was saved from elimination by immunity.
This couple won the competition.
This couple came in second in the competition.
This couple came in third in the competition.

== Guest performances ==
Date	Artist(s)	Song(s)	Dancers
6 March 2015	Tomasz Szymuś's Orchestra	"Feel This Moment"	All professional dancers
13 March 2015	Małgorzata Bernatowicz	"Sway"	Ewa Kasprzyk & Jan Kliment
20 March 2015	Tomasz Szymuś's Orchestra	"Mam tę moc"	Caro Dance and Anna Głogowska
20 March 2015	Paulla	"Skyfall"	Ada Fijał & Krzysztof Hulboj
27 March 2015	Grzegorz Hyży	"Wstaję"	Łukasz Garlicki & Magdalena Soszyńska-Michno
27 March 2015	Grzegorz Hyży	"Pusty dom"	—
10 April 2015	Adam Asanov	"Bałkanica"	Julia Pogrebińska & Rafał Maserak
10 April 2015	Tomasz Szymuś	"Et si tu n'existais pas"	Tatiana Okupnik & Tomasz Barański
10 April 2015	Stefano Terrazzino	"L'Italiano"	Sylwia Juszczak-Arnesen & Kamil Kuroczko
17 April 2015	Tomasz Szymuś's Orchestra	"Uptown Funk"	All professional dancers and celebrities
17 April 2015	Sławomir Uniatowski	"Can't Take My Eyes Off You"	Grzegorz Łapanowski & Agnieszka Kaczorowska
17 April 2015	Doda	"If I Could Turn Back Time"	VOLT dance group
17 April 2015	Doda	"Riotka"	VOLT dance group
24 April 2015	Tomasz Szymuś's Orchestra		Team UDS and Anna Głogowska
24 April 2015	Tomasz Szymuś's Orchestra		Team UDS
1 May 2015	Tomasz Szymuś's Orchestra	"Mast kalandar" from Heyy Babyy	All professional dancers and celebrities
8 May 2015	Tomasz Szymuś's Orchestra	"Diamonds Are a Girl's Best Friend"; TBA; TBA; TBA	Formation LOTOS-Jantar
8 May 2015	Marek Kaliszuk	"Jej portret"	Krzysztof Wieszczek & Agnieszka Kaczorowska
8 May 2015	Danzel	"Valerie"	Tatiana Okupnik & Tomasz Barański
8 May 2015	Danzel	"Pump It Up!"	VOLT dance group
15 May 2015	Dawid Kwiatkowski	"Call Me Maybe"	Dawid Kwiatkowski & Janja Lesar
15 May 2015	Dawid Kwiatkowski	"Walking on Sunshine"	Julia Pogrebińska & Rafał Maserak
15 May 2015	Sound'n'Grace	"Dach"	Krzysztof Wieszczek & Agnieszka Kaczorowska
15 May 2015	Kasia Cerekwicka	"Rolling in the Deep"	Tatiana Okupnik & Tomasz Barański
15 May 2015	Kasia Cerekwicka	"Między słowami"	—
22 May 2015	Cleo	"My Słowianie"	VOLT dance group
22 May 2015	Tomasz Szymuś's Orchestra	"Nie stało się nic"	Wojciech Brzozowski & Paulina Janicka
22 May 2015	Tomasz Szymuś's Orchestra	"Za szkłem"	Marcin Najman & Janja Lesar
22 May 2015	Tomasz Szymuś's Orchestra	"Jak nie my to kto"	Norbert 'Norbi' Dudziuk & Nina Tyrka
22 May 2015	Edyta Górniak	"Listen"	—
22 May 2015	Sławomir Uniatowski	"Thinking Out Loud"	Kamila Szczawińska & Robert Kochanek
22 May 2015	Sławomir Uniatowski	"Oh, Pretty Woman"	Łukasz Garlicki & Magdalena Soszyńska-Michno
22 May 2015	Sławomir Uniatowski	"Bailando"	Grzegorz Łapanowski & Valeriya Zhuravlyova
22 May 2015	Sławomir Uniatowski	"Apologize"	Ada Fijał & Krzysztof Hulboj
22 May 2015	Tomasz Szymuś's Orchestra	"Umbrella"	Sylwia Juszczak-Arnesen & Kamil Kuroczko
22 May 2015	Tomasz Szymuś's Orchestra	"Woman in Love"	Ewa Kasprzyk & Jan Kliment
22 May 2015	Tomasz Szymuś's Orchestra	"Everybody Needs Somebody to Love"	Julia Pogrebińska & Rafał Maserak
22 May 2015	Aneta Zając & Stefano Terrazzino	"Say Something"	VOLT dance group
22 May 2015	Agnieszka Sienkiewicz & Stefano Terrazzino	"Pirates of the Caribbean Theme"	VOLT dance group

== Rating figures ==
Date	Episode	Official rating 4+	Share 4+	Official rating 16–49	Share 16–49
6 March 2015	1	3 513 198	22.25%	—N/a	—N/a
13 March 2015	2	3 313 965	21.25%	—N/a	—N/a
20 March 2015	3	3 291 148	21.23%	—N/a	—N/a
27 March 2015	4	3 280 674	20.96%	—N/a	—N/a
10 April 2015	5	3 146 447	20.64%	—N/a	—N/a
17 April 2015	6	3 284 017	20.96%	—N/a	—N/a
24 April 2015	7	3 107 330	21.56%	—N/a	—N/a
1 May 2015	8	2 963 385	19.98%	—N/a	—N/a
8 May 2015	9	2 975 085	21.07%	—N/a	—N/a
15 May 2015	10	2 993 132	21.05%	—N/a	—N/a
22 May 2015	11	3 620 176	25.26%	1 091 913	19.72%
Average	Spring 2015	3 234 655	21.50%	879 229	15.01%
