= Bronisław Cieślak =

Polish actor and politician (1943–2021)

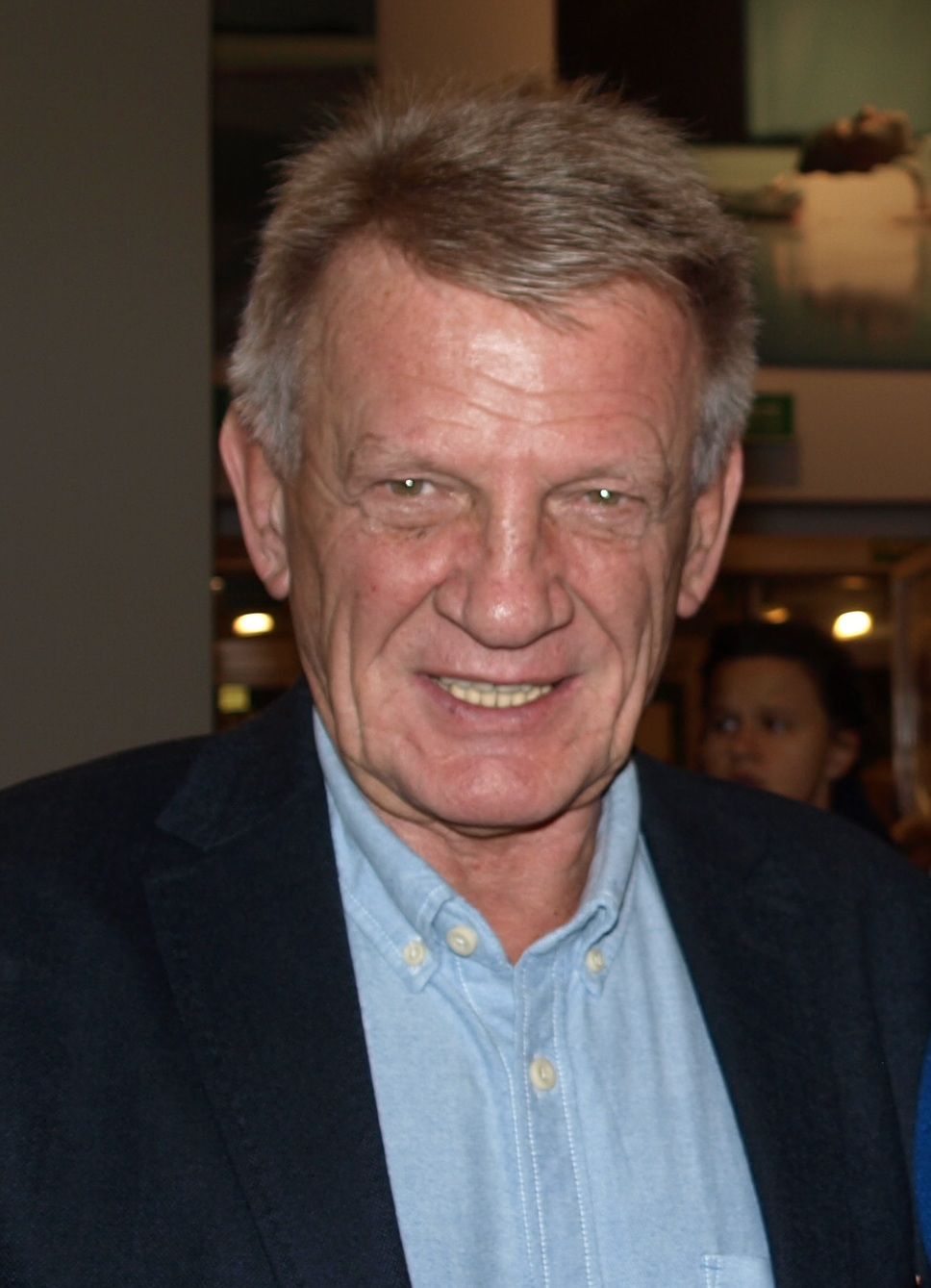
- Cieślak pictured in 2014
- Born: Bronisław Cieślak; 8 October 1943; Kraków, Poland
- Died: 2 May 2021 (aged 77); Kraków, Poland
- Occupations: Actor, journalist, politician
- Years active: 1976–2021
- Political party: Democratic Left Alliance (SLD)
- Spouse: Anna
- Children: 3
- Relatives: Anna Cieślak (niece)

Bronisław Emil Cieślak (8 October 1943 – 2 May 2021) was a Polish actor, journalist, media presenter and politician. He was born in Kraków.

He was best known for his role as Sławomir Borewicz, the main hero of a popular Polish TV series 07 zgłoś się (filmed in the 1970s and 1980s).

He was a deputy to Polish parliament (Sejm) from 1997 to 2005 as a member of the Democratic Left Alliance party.

== Honours ==
- Silver Medal for Merit to Culture – Gloria Artis
