= Shigeru Umebayashi =

Japanese composer (born 1951)

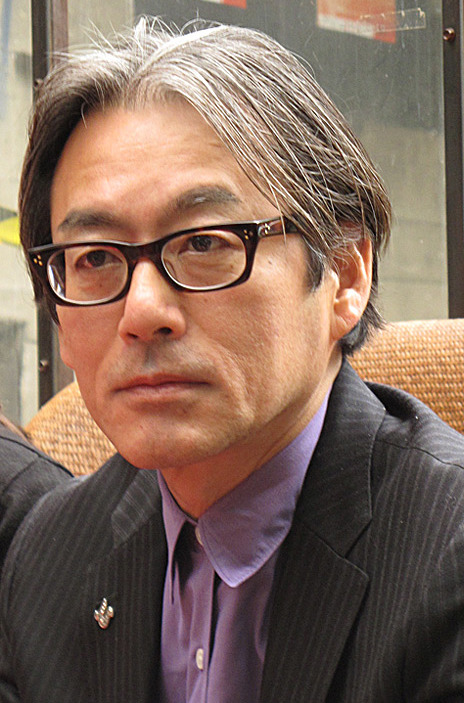

Background information
- Born: Shigeru Umebayashi; February 19, 1951 (age 75); Kitakyushu, Fukuoka, Japan
- Genres: Rock, film scores
- Occupations: Composer, musician
- Years active: 1984–present
- Website: shigeru-umebayashi.com

Shigeru Umebayashi (梅林茂, Umebayashi Shigeru; [ɯmebajaɕi ɕiɡeɾɯ]) (born February 19, 1951) is a Japanese composer.

Once the leader and bass player of Japan's new wave rock band EX, Umebayashi began scoring films in 1985 when the band broke up. He has more than 30 Japanese and Chinese film scores to his credit and is perhaps best known in the West for "Yumeji's Theme" (originally from Seijun Suzuki's Yumeji), included in director Wong Kar-wai's In the Mood for Love (2000). Umebayashi scored most of Wong Kar-wai's follow-up film, 2046 (2004), and House of Flying Daggers.

== Discography ==
=== 1980s ===
- Itsuka Darekaga Korosareru (1984)
- Tomoyo Shizukani Nemure (1985)
- Sorekara (1985)
- Sorobanzuku (1986)
- Shinshi Domei (1986)
- Kyohu no Yacchan (1987)
- Getting Blue in Color (1988)

=== 1990s ===
- Hong Kong Paradise (1990)
- Tekken (1990)
- Yumeji (1991)
- Ote (1991)
- Goaisatsu (1991)
- Arihureta Ai ni Kansuru Chosa (1992)
- Byoin he Iko 2 Yamai ha Kikara (1992)
- Nemuranai Machi Shinjuku Zame (1993)
- Izakaya Yurei (1994)
- Zero Woman (1995)
- Kumokiri Nizaemon (1995)
- Boxer Joe (1995)
- Kitanai Yatsu (1995)
- Hashirana Akan Yoake Made (1995)
- The Christ of Nanjing (1995)
- Shin Gokudo Kisha (1996)
- Izakaya Yurei 2 (1996)
- Ichigo Domei (1997)
- Isana no Umi (1997)
- Watashitachi ga Sukidatta Koto (1997)
- G4 Option Zero (1997)
- Fuyajo (1998)
- Belle Epoch (1998)

=== 2000s ===
- 2000 A.D. (2000)
- Shojo (2000)
- In the Mood for Love (2000)
- Midnight Fly (2001)
- Hikari no Ame (2001)
- Onmyoji (2001)
- Zhou Yu's Train (2002)
- Onmyoji II (2003)
- Floating Land Scape (2003)
- House of Flying Daggers (2004)
- 2046 (2004)
- Hibi (2004)
- Fearless (2006)
- Daisy (2006)
- Curse of the Golden Flower (2006)
- Hannibal Rising (2007)
- Absurdistan (2008)
- Incendiary (2008)
- Tears for Sale (2008)
- The Real Shaolin (2008)
- Murderer (2009)
- A Single Man (2009)

=== 2010s ===
- True Legend (2010)
- Days of Grace (2011)
- Trishna (2011)
- The Grandmaster (2013)
- Rise of the Legend (2014)
- The Bride (2015)
- Crouching Tiger, Hidden Dragon: Sword of Destiny (2016)
- The Wasted Times (2016)

=== 2020s ===
- Ghost of Tsushima (2020)
- Hero (2022)
- In the Belly of a Tiger (2024)

== Accolades ==
- 2023 – Lifetime Achievement Award at the 18th Rome Film Festival.

== See also ==
- List of film score composers
