= Maiden Vows =

2010 film by Filip Bajon

Maiden Vows (Polish original title: Śluby Panieńskie and USA title: War of Love) is a 2010 Polish historical drama directed by Filip Bajon. The film is an adaptation of Aleksander Fredro's play of the same title from 1832. The film is set in the Austrian Partition and was shot in Kotuń and Nowa Sucha from August 26 to September 30, 2010.

The film is set in the nineteenth century, but the film has anachronistic contemporary inserts (e.g. car, cell phones, modern press).

== Plot ==
1825, a small manor house in the south of Poland. Majętny Radost (Robert Więckiewicz) intends to get his nephew Gustaw (Maciej Stuhr) with the beautiful Aniela (Anna Cieślak) - the daughter of Dobrójska (Edyta Olszówka) living next door. The parties quickly agree on the marriage contract. The problem is that Gucio spends the nights at the "Under the Golden Parrot" tavern, seduces women, drinks, dances and never marries.

Also, Aniela, who is influenced by her cousin Klara (Marta Żmuda Trzebiatowska), is far from thinking about marriage. Klara, an ardent opponent of men, is constantly mocking the intrusive romantic Albin (Borys Szyc) who is in love with her. This temperamental, intelligent, brilliant woman, defiant and blunt, wants to decide her own fate. Therefore, he plays with Albin's love and rebels openly against common morals. Realizing that the family also wants to see her and Albina on the wedding carpet, he convinces Angela to make maiden vows. Aniela and Klara swear an oath: I promise unwavering stability for women, hate the masculine race, never be a wife.

However, girls' weddings cannot be kept secret. When Gustav finds out about them, the spirit of perversity awakens in him. He decides to get everyone involved in a clever intrigue. He wants to make Aniela confess to him and Klara appreciate Albin's affection.

== Cast ==
- Robert Więckiewicz as Radost
- Maciej Stuhr as Gustaw
- Anna Cieślak as Aniela
- Edyta Olszówka as Dobrójska
- Marta Żmuda Trzebiatowska as Klara
- Borys Szyc as Albin
- Andrzej Grabowski as Klara's father
- Daniel Olbrychski as nobleman
- Marian Opania as nobleman
- Lech Ordon as nobleman
- Marian Dziędziel as nobleman
- Jerzy Braszka as nobleman
- Michał Piela as Albina's farmhand
- Wiktor Zborowski as Jan
- Stefan Szmidt as Radost's valet
- Henryk Rajfer as Cadyk
- Jerzy Rogalski as Albina's servant
- Dariusz Kuchta as Huzar
- Jan Nowicki
