= Ada Fijał =

Polish actress and singer (born 1976)

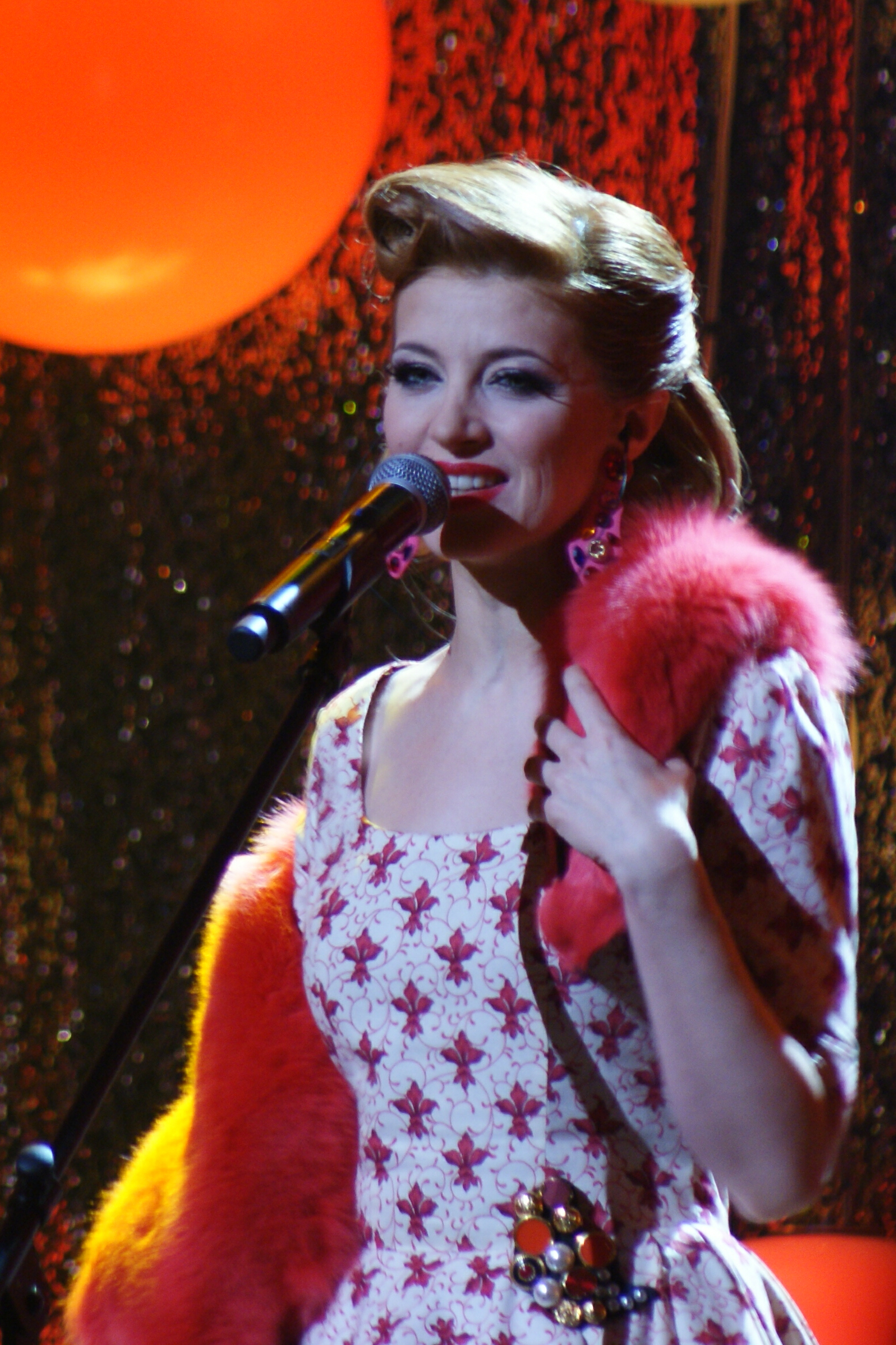
- Ada Fijał in 2011
- Born: 20 October 1976 (age 49); Kraków, Poland
- Occupations: Actor; Singer
- Years active: 2008 – present
- Known for: Dancing with the Stars

Ada Fijał (born 20 October 1976) is a Polish television actor and singer. She was unsuccessful in a bid to represent Poland in the Eurovision Song Contest in 2011. She appeared in the Polish version of Dancing with the Stars.

== Life ==
Fijał was born in 1976 in Kraków. She first qualified in dentistry at Jagiellonian University Medical College in Kraków before training in acting and performing.

In 2008 she joined the Polish soap "Barwy szczęścia" (Colours of Happiness) and she and the soap were going strong in 2019.

In 2011 she was a contestant to represent Poland in the Eurovision Song Contest singing "Hot like Fire". She noted that she was not a singer. She came 6th.

Fijał appeared in the 16th season of Taniec z Gwiazdami, the Polish version of "Dancing with the Stars". She was paired with Krzysztof Hulboj and they finished in 6th place. Their highest score was 39 out of 40 for their Viennese Waltz.

In 2019 she appeared in the Polish version of Playboy magazine. Fijal said it was her idea for her to be clothed. She also appeared in the Polish television series "Slad". She played the part of a forensic scientist.
