= Anna Cieślak =

Polish actress (born 1980)

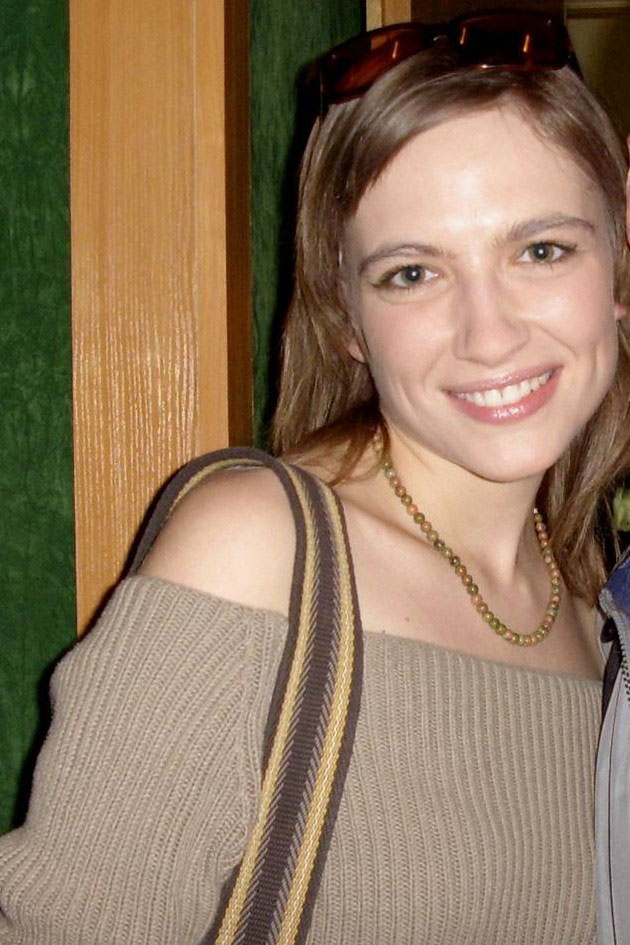
- Cieślak in 2006
- Born: 17 September 1980 (age 45); Szczecin, Poland
- Education: AST National Academy of Theatre Arts
- Occupation: Actress
- Years active: 2002–present
- Spouse: Edward Miszczak (m. 2021)
- Relatives: Bronisław Cieślak (uncle)

Anna Cieślak (Polish pronunciation: [ˈan.na ˈt͡ɕɛ.ɕlak]; born 17 September 1980) is a Polish actress.

== Biography ==
Cieślak was born in Szczecin to father Jacek and mother Bożena. Her uncle, Bronisław Cieślak, was also an actor. She graduated from the AST National Academy of Theatre Arts in 2004. Upon graduating, she made her stage debut at the Juliusz Słowacki Theatre. In 2015, she was a contestant on the 17th season of Dancing with the Stars: Taniec z gwiazdami, but later withdrew due to injury.

She married Edward Miszczak at the Church of St. Anne in Kraków on 21 August 2021. Through her marriage, she has two stepsons.

== Filmography ==
=== Film ===
Year	Title	Role	Notes	Ref.
2005	Your Name Is Justine	Mariola		
2007	Dlaczego nie!	Małgosia		
2008	Jak żyć?	Ewa		
2009	General Nil	Maria Fieldorf		
2009	Copernicus' Star	Anna	Voice role	
2010	Pixels	Alicja		
2010	Maiden Vows	Aniela		
2011	Mars Needs Moms	Ki	Voice role; Polish dub	
2013	Frozen	Anna	Voice role; Polish dub	
2015	The Little Prince	Rose	Voice role; Polish dub	
2016	Finding Dory	Destiny	Voice role; Polish dub	
2019	Frozen 2	Anna	Voice role; Polish dub	
2022	Apokawixa	Aga's mother		
TBA	Sami w domu	Klementyna		

=== Television ===
Year	Title	Role	Notes	Ref.
2004	Pensjonat pod Różą	Ewelina	1 episode	
2004–2008	Glina	Julia Gajewska	25 episodes	
2005	Karol: A Man Who Became Pope	Tesia Kluger	Television film	
2005–2006	Egzamin z życia	Joanna Wierzyńska	27 episodes	
2006–2007	Na dobre i na złe	Dr. Alicja Siedlecka	22 episodes	
2008	Days of Honor	Sister Róza	9 episodes	
2010	Ludzie Chudego	Sylwia Łukaszewicz	22 episodes	
2011	Rezydencja	Barbara Kochanowska	Main role	
2012	Hotel 52	Magda	1 episode	
2012	Komisarz Alex	Julia Krawczyk	1 episode	
2013–2021	Father Matthew	Magdalena Kozłowska; Wanda Rzemyk; Emilia Krupa	3 episodes	
2014	True Law	Laura Podolska	1 episode	
2014	O mnie się nie martw	Rudzka	1 episode	
2015–2024	Na Wspólnej	Joanna Berg	827 episodes	
2020–2022	Angel of Death	Monika Wolnicka	21 episodes	
2021	Osiecka	Hanka Olszewska	1 episode	
2021	Kayko and Kokosh	Mgiełka	Voice role; 1 episode	
2022–2023	Mój agent	Ewa Waszczyk	12 episodes	
2023	A Girl and an Astronaut	Karolina Borowska	6 episodes	
2023	Rafi	Karolina Kolbus	9 episodes	

=== Video games ===
Year	Title	Role	Notes	Ref.
2013	The Last of Us	Ellie	Polish version	
2015	The Witcher 3: Wild Hunt	Ciri of Cintra	Polish version	
2020	The Last of Us Part II	Ellie	Polish version	
