= Abel Korzeniowski =

Polish composer (born 1972)

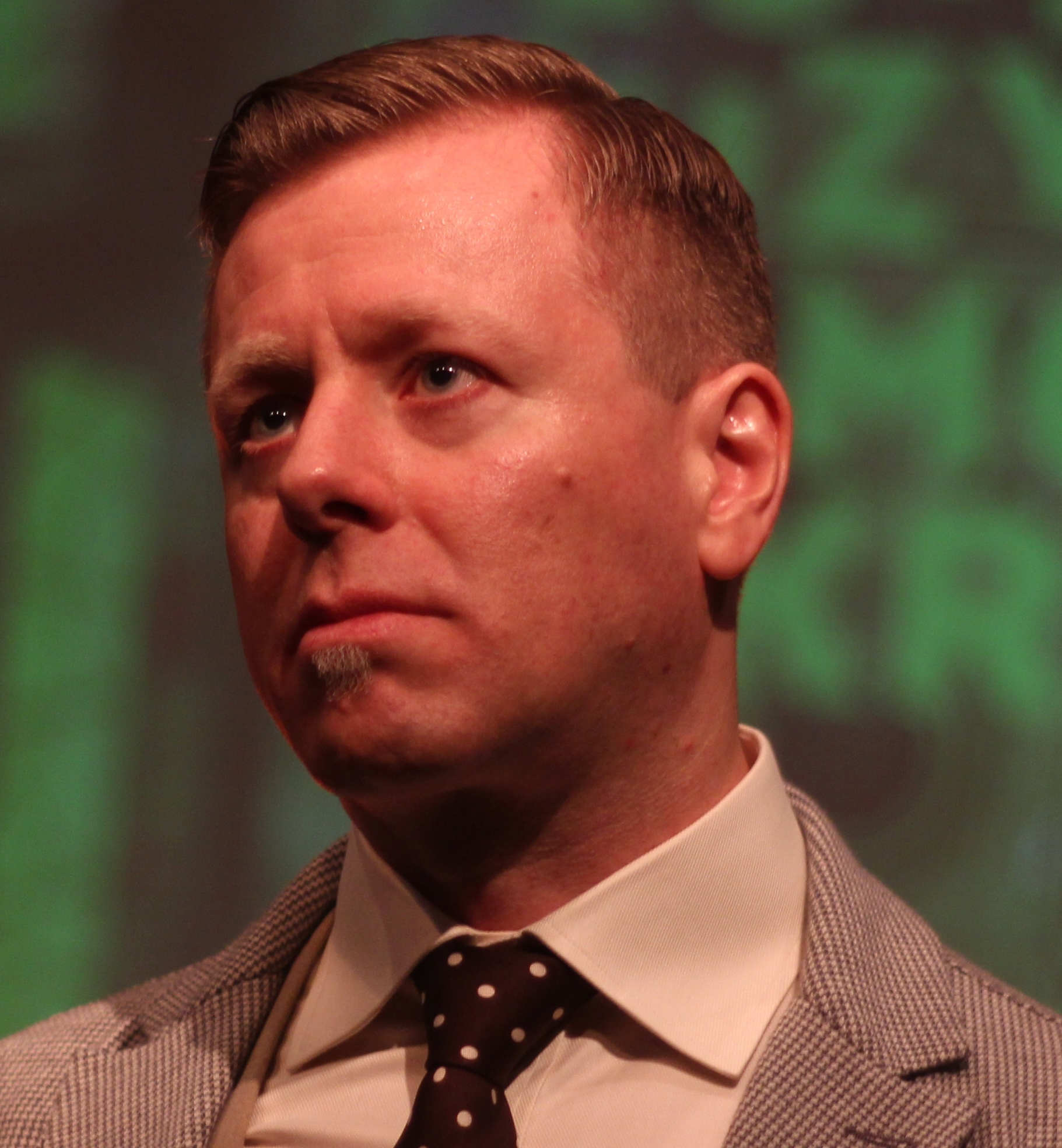
- Korzeniowski at Film Music Festival in Kraków, 2013

Background information
- Born: 18 July 1972 (age 54); Kraków, Poland
- Genres: Film rock; classical rock
- Occupations: Composer, conductor
- Years active: 1997–present
- Website: www.abelkorzeniowski.com

Abel Korzeniowski (Polish pronunciation: [ˈabɛl koʐɛˈɲɔfski]; born 18 July 1972) is a Polish composer of film and theatre scores.

== Early life and education ==
Korzeniowski was born in Kraków. He had contact with music from early childhood: his mother Barbara plays the cello and both his brothers Antoni and Andrzej are musicians. He graduated from the Academy of Music in Kraków majoring in cello and composer studies under the supervision of Krzysztof Penderecki.

== Career ==
Korzeniowski won acclaim as the composer of music for films and theatre plays. In 2000, he received his first major individual prize – Golden Lions for Best Film Score at the Gdynia Film Festival for his music to Jerzy Stuhr’s Duże Zwierzę (The Big Animal).

Korzeniowski is a composer of film scores for several Polish films: Big Animal, Tomorrow's Weather, An Angel in Krakow, as well as Hollywood productions: Battle for Terra, Pu-239, Tickling Leo, A Single Man and W.E..

He composed the music for the adaptation of François Villon's 15th century work Le Testament. The play was first performed in Toruń in 2002 and was directed by Marta Stebnicka. In 2004, he composed a score for Fritz Lang's 1927 silent film Metropolis for the New Horizons Film Festival, a major Polish festival. The film was shown with music performed live in Cieszyn in 2004.

He won a San Diego Film Critics Society Award in 2009 for the Best score in A Single Man and was nominated for a 2009 Golden Globe in the best original score category for the same film. In 2012, he was nominated for Best Original Score for the film W.E., at the 69th Golden Globe Awards.

In 2012, Korzeniowski arranged Patricia Kaas’s album, Kaas chante Piaf, which was recorded as a tribute to Edith Piaf.

Since 2017, Korzeniowski has been a member of the Academy of Motion Picture Arts and Sciences.

== Filmography ==
=== Film and television ===
Year	Title	Director	Studio	Notes
2000	The Big Animal	Jerzy Stuhr	Oscilloscope; Milestone Films	—N/a
2002	An Angel in Krakow	Artur Wieçek	Beres i Baron Media Production; Studio Filmowe L&L	—N/a
2003	Tomorrow's Weather	Jerzy Stuhr	Studio Filmowe Zebra	—N/a
1927	Metropolis	Fritz Lang	UFA; Parufamet	New score 2004
2007	Pu-239	Scott Z. Burns	Beacon Pictures; HBO Films	—N/a
2007	Battle for Terra	Aristomenis Tsirbas	Snoot Toons; IM Global; Lionsgate; Roadside Attractions	—N/a
2008	What We Take from Each Other	Scott Z. Burns	60Frames Entertainment	Short film
2008	Confessions of a Go-Go Girl	Grant Harvey	—N/a	—N/a
2009	Tickling Leo	Jeremy Davidson	—N/a	—N/a
2009	A Single Man	Tom Ford	Artina Films; Depth of Field; Fade to Black; The Weinstein Company; IM Global	—N/a
2011	Copernicus' Star	Zdzislaw Kudla; Andrzej Orzechowski	Studio Filmów Rysunkowych; Wytwórnia Filmów Dukumentalnych I Fabularnych; Bank Spóldzielczy w Skoczowie; Kino Swiat	—N/a
2012	W.E.	Madonna Louise Ciccone	Semtex Films; IM Global; StudioCanal; The Weinstein Company	—N/a
2013	Escape from Tomorrow	Randy Moore	Mankurt Media; Producers Distribution Agency; FilmBuff; Cinedigm	—N/a
2013	Romeo & Juliet	Carlo Carlei	Amber Entertainment; Echo Lake Entertainment; Swarovski Entertainment; Icon Productions; Entertainment Film Distributors; Relativity Media	—N/a
2014–16	Penny Dreadful	John Logan	Desert Wolf Productions; Neal Street Productions; Showtime Networks	TV series
2015	A Grain of Truth	Borys Lankosz	—N/a	—N/a
2016	Nocturnal Animals	Tom Ford	Fade to Black Productions; Artina Films; Focus Features; Universal Pictures	—N/a
2018	The Nun	Corin Hardy	New Line Cinema; Atomic Monster; The Safran Company; Warner Bros. Pictures	—N/a
2020	The Courier	Dominic Cooke	42; FilmNation Entertainment; SunnyMarch; Lionsgate; Roadside Attractions	—N/a
2022	Till	Chinonye Chukwu	Orion Pictures; Eon Productions; Frederick Zollo Productions; Whoop, Inc. United Artists Releasing; Universal Pictures	—N/a
2022	Emily	Frances O'Connor	Embankment Films; Ingenious Media; Tempo Productions; Arenamedia; Warner Bros. Pictures	—N/a
2024	The Watchers	Ishana Night Shyamalan	New Line Cinema; Blinding Edge Pictures; Inimitable Pictures; Warner Bros. Pictures	—N/a
2025	Good Boy	Jan Komasa	Recorded Picture Company; Skopia Film	—N/a

== Discography ==
=== Albums ===
- Music for drama (2005)
- Kaas chante Piaf (2012)

== Awards and nominations ==
Year	Association	Category	Work	Result	Ref.
2000	Golden Lions Award	Best Music for Film	The Big Animal	Nominated	—N/a
2001	Golden Ducks Award	Best Film Composer	—N/a	Nominated	—N/a
2002	Ludwig Award	Best Music for Theater Play	Kafka	Won	—N/a
2002	Jancio Wodnik Award	Best Music	An Angel in Krakow	Won	—N/a
2005	Golden Knight Award	Best Composer	Tomorrow's Weather	Won	—N/a
2009	San Diego Film Critics Society	Best Score	A Single Man	Won	—N/a
2009	Golden Globe Awards	Best Original Score	A Single Man	Nominated	—N/a
2009	International Film Music Critics Association (IFMCA)	Best Original Score for a Drama Film	A Single Man	Won	
2010	World Soundtrack Awards	Best Original Film Score of the Year	A Single Man	Nominated	—N/a
2010	AFT Awards	Best Original Score	A Single Man	Won	
2010	The International Cinephile Society (ICS)	Best Original Score	A Single Man	Won	
2010	World Soundtrack Award	Public Choice	A Single Man	Won	
2010	World Soundtrack Award	Discovery of the Year	A Single Man	Won	
2011	CUE Awards	Best Dramatic Score	W.E. ("Dance For Me, Wallis")	Won	—N/a
2011	CUE Awards	Best Cue on Soundtrack	W.E. ("Dance For Me, Wallis")	Won	—N/a
2011	International Film Music Critics Association (IFMCA)	Best Original Score for a Drama Film	W.E.	Nominated	—N/a
2012	Golden Globe Awards	Best Original Score	W.E.	Nominated	—N/a
2013	International Film Music Critics Association (IFMCA)	Film Score of the Year	Romeo & Juliet	Won	
2013	International Film Music Critics Association (IFMCA)	Best Original Score for a Drama Film	Romeo & Juliet	Won	
2013	International Film Music Critics Association (IFMCA)	Film Composer of the Year	Romeo & Juliet	Won	
2013	International Film Music Critics Association (IFMCA)	Film Composer of the Year	Escape from Tomorrow	Won	
2015	International Film Music Critics Association (IFMCA)	Best Original Score for a Television Series	Penny Dreadful	Nominated	—N/a
2015	British Academy Television Craft Awards (BAFTA)	Best Original Television Music	Penny Dreadful	Won	
2016	Anthony Asquith Award	Best Original Score	Nocturnal Animals	Nominated	—N/a
