= Copernicus' Star =

- Poster
- Directed by: Zdzisław Kudła; Andrzej Orzechowski
- Written by: Zdzisław Kudła; Andrzej Orzechowski
- Produced by: Romana Miś
- Starring: Piotr Adamczyk; Jerzy Stuhr; Anna Cieślak; Jan Peszek; Piotr Fronczewski; Olgierd Łukaszewicz
- Edited by: Irena Hussar
- Music by: Abel Korzeniowski
- Production company: Studio Filmów Rysunkowych
- Distributed by: Kino Świat
- Release date: 22 October 2009
- Running time: 90 minutes
- Country: Poland
- Language: Polish

Copernicus' Star (Polish: Gwiazda Kopernika) is a Polish-language children's animated film, directed and written by Zdzisław Kudła and Andrzej Orzechowski. It was produced by Studio Filmów Rysunkowych in Bielsko-Biała, Poland, and released on 2 October 2009. The main cast included Piotr Adamczyk, Jerzy Stuhr, Anna Cieślak, Jan Peszek, Piotr Fronczewski, and Olgierd Łukaszewicz. The story follows Nicholas, an astronomy student as he makes the world-changing discovery. It was based on the life of Nicholas Copernicus, a 15th- and 16th-century Renaissance scientist, and the author of the heliocentric model of the universe.

== Plot ==
Nicholas Copernicus, son of a merchant, is a smart curious child that lives in the 15-century Toruń. When he is ten years old, Paul van de Volder, a Dutch astrologer, visits his house and foretells him a brilliant future. With the help of his father, the boy begins to take an interest in the stars hoping to find some answers. When his father dies Nicolaus does not lose faith. Some time later he starts to study at the Jagiellonian University in Kraków. It is here that he meets Paul van de Volder again. The battle for Nicolaus’s soul begins. On the one side there is the charlatan astrologer Van de Volder, on the other, Albert of Brudzewo and the other professors at the University. The young Nicolaus discovers the secrets of the sky. Astrology and astronomy are in conflict. Searching for the answers, Nicolaus is led to an astounding discovery. Uncertain of his findings, he goes to Rome and Bologna, where his further studies confirm his theory. However, before he publishes it, he has to face his antagonist one last time.

== Cast ==
- Piotr Adamczyk as Nicholas Copernicus
- Jerzy Stuhr as Paul van de Volder,
- Anna Cieślak as Anna
- Jan Peszek as professor Novarra
- Piotr Fronczewski as Albert of Brudzew
- Małgorzata Zajączkowska as Barbara, Nicholas's mother
- Olgierd Łukaszewicz
- Andrzej Grabowski
- Piotr Piecha
- Krzysztof Gosztyła
- Robert Mazurkiewicz
- Grażyna Bułka
- Michał Piela
- Kazimierz Czapla
- Lucyna Sypniewska
- Grzegorz Drojewski
- Joanna Pach
- Barbara Zielińska
- Paweł Ciołkosz
- Michał Głowacki

== Production ==
Copernicus' Star was written and directed by Zdzisław Kudła and Andrzej Orzechowski, with Kudła also being the executive producer and art director, while Romana Miś was the producer. The music was done by Abel Korzeniowski, sound by Tomasz Dukszta, and editing by Irena Hussar. Illustrator Janusz Stanny developed the initial concept of the art design. The film was produced by Studio Filmów Rysunkowych in Bielsko-Biała, Poland, and was its first feature production since 1986 Bolek and Lolek in the Wild West. The film was animated predominantly in traditional 2D technique, with some 3D computer-generated elements. The production lasted two years, with over 70 animators and illustrators working on the project, and over 450,000 drawings being made, making it one of the largest 2D-animated productions in Poland at the time. The main cast included Piotr Adamczyk, Jerzy Stuhr, Anna Cieślak, Jan Peszek, Piotr Fronczewski, and Olgierd Łukaszewicz. In total, the production included 23 actors, including members of the Polish Theatre in Bielsko-Biała. The film was distributed by Kino Świat, and released in cinemas in Poland on 22 October 2009. The date was chosen as it coincided with the International Year of Astronomy.

== Accolades ==
Accolades received by Copernicus' Star
Award	Year	Category	Result	Ref.
International Film Festival for Children and Youth in Armenia	2010	Animated Feature Film	Won	
Se-Ma-For Film Festival	2011	People's Choice	Won	
Tehran International Animation Festival	2011	The CIFEJ Award	Won	
