= Imperfect (disambiguation) =

The imperfect, or past imperfective, is a verb form in linguistics.

Imperfect or imperfection or imperfectionist may also refer to:

== Film and TV ==
- Imperfect (2012 film), a 2012 Singaporean film
- Imperfect (2019 film), a 2019 Indonesian film
- I'mPerfect (film), a 2025 Filipino film
- An Imperfection, a 2015 Sri Lankan Canadian film
- "Imperfection" (Star Trek: Voyager), a TV episode
- The Imperfects, a 2022 TV series
- Imperfect the Series, a 2021 Indonesian TV series
- Imperfect the Series 2, a 2022 Indonesian TV series

== Music ==
- Imperfectly, a 1992 album by singer-songwriter Ani DiFranco
- Imperfection, 2004 album by Real Life
- "Imperfect", song by Joi Cardwell
- "Imperfection", 2008 song by Glenn Hughes from First Underground Nuclear Kitchen
- "Imperfection" (Evanescence song) from Synthesis
- "Imperfection", 2015 song by Tinchy Stryder featuring vocals by Fuse ODG
- "Imperfection", song by Skillet from Collide
- "Imperfection", song by Gentleman from Aloe Blacc discography
- "Imperfections" (song), song by Celine Dion from Courage
- "Imperfections", song by Josh Osho from L.i.f.e
- "Imperfections", a song by Pop Smoke from Shoot for the Stars, Aim for the Moon
- The Imperfectionists, the backing band for Ian Stephen

== Literature ==
- The Imperfectionists, 2010 novel by Tom Rachman
- "The Imperfectionist", a 2013 poem by Steve Shrader; see 2013 in poetry

== Other uses ==
- the imperfective aspect in linguistics
- Imperfect group, a group with no nontrivial perfect quotients
- The Imperfects, a group of supervillains from Marvel Nemesis: Rise of the Imperfects

== See also ==
- Perfect (disambiguation)
- Perfection (disambiguation)
- Perfectionism (disambiguation)
- Perfectly Imperfect (disambiguation)
