= The Voice Kids (Polish TV series) series 1 =

Polish reality talent show

The Voice Kids
- Series 1
- Hosted by: Tomasz Kammel; Barbara Kurdej-Szatan; Adam Zdrójkowski (V Reporter)
- Judges: Tomson & Baron; Edyta Górniak; Dawid Kwiatkowski
- Winner: Roksana Węgiel

Release
- Original network: TVP2
- Original release: January 1 – February 24, 2018

Series chronology
- Next → Series 2

The Voice Kids is a Polish reality talent show that premiered on January 1, 2018 on the TVP 2 television network. The Voice Kids is part of the international syndication The Voice based on the reality singing competition launched in the Netherlands as The Voice Kids, created by Dutch television producer John de Mol. The coaches are Tomson & Baron, Edyta Górniak and Dawid Kwiatkowski. The season was won by then 13-year-old Roksana Węgiel from Jasło. This marked Edyta Górniak's first and only win as a coach.

== Coaches ==
Coaches gallery

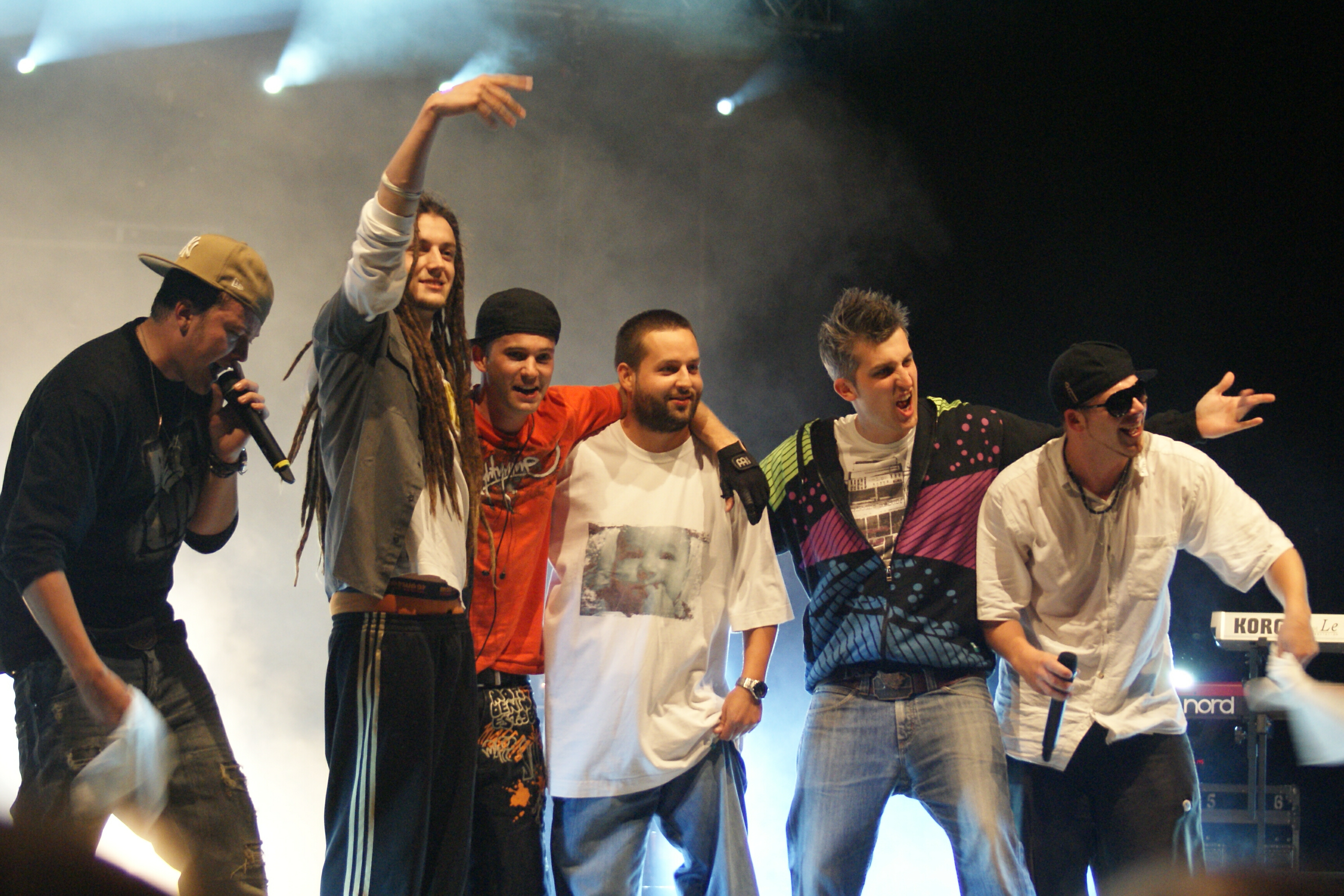
Tomson & Baron

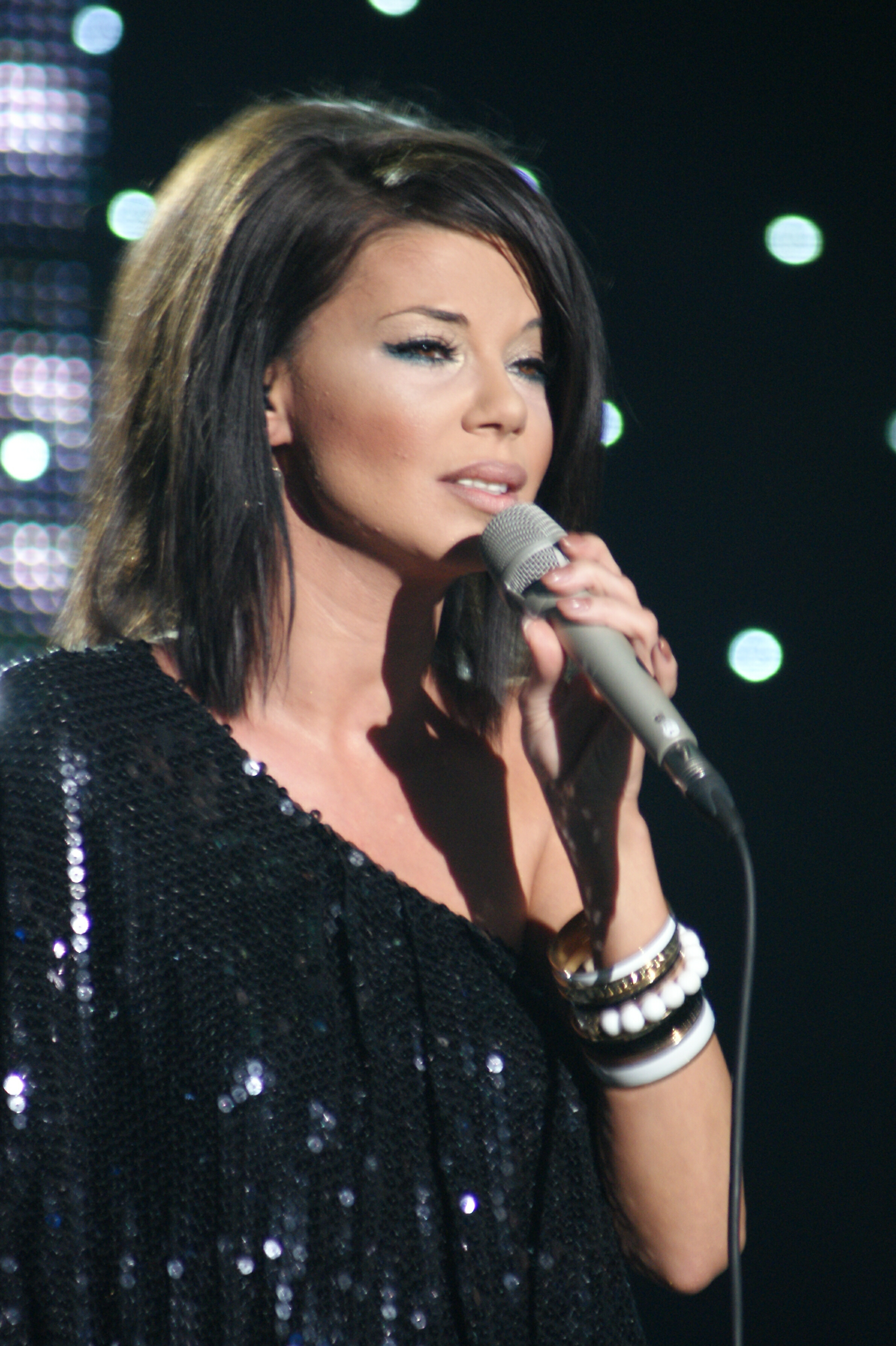
Edyta Górniak

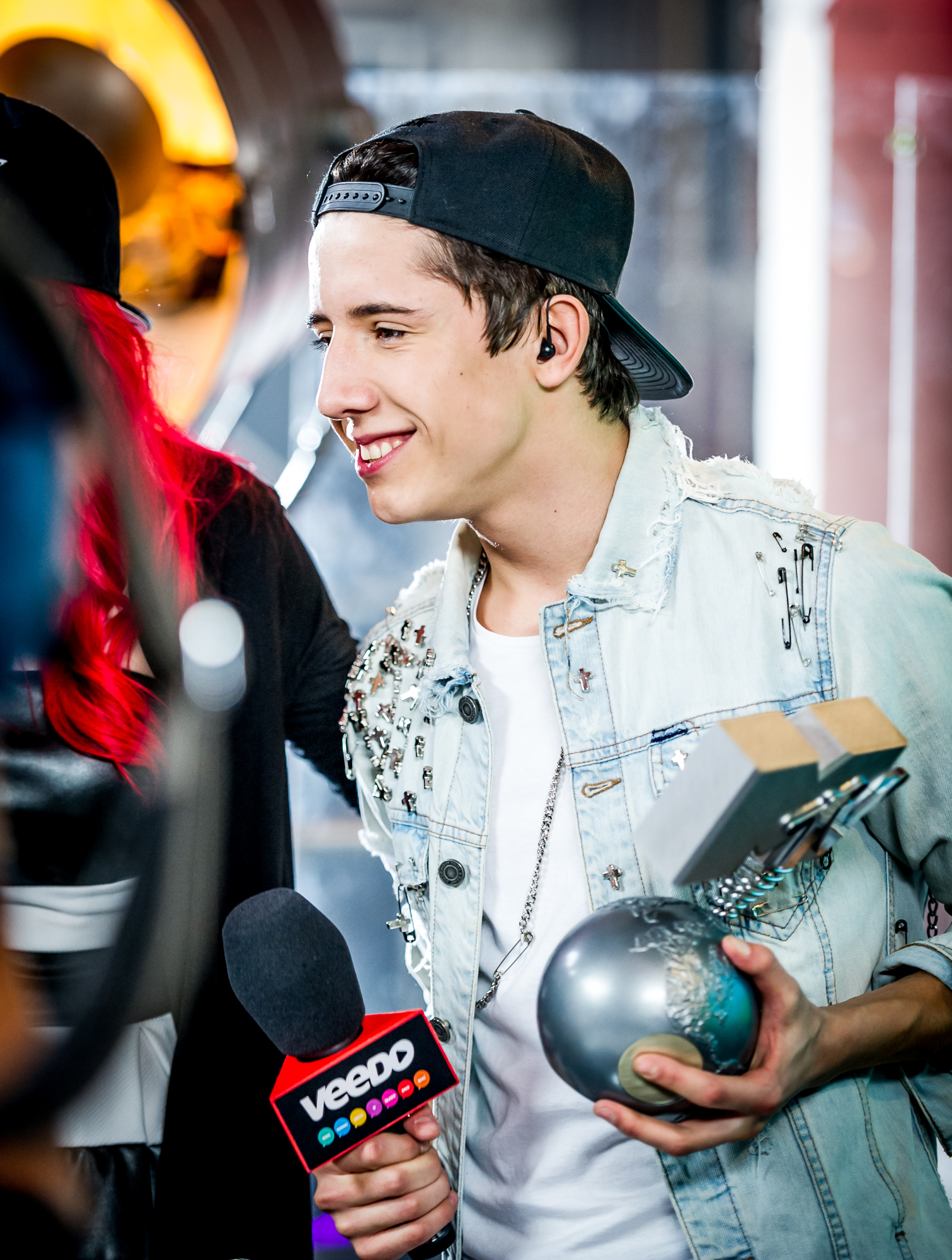
Dawid Kwiatkowski

== Teams ==
Colour key

- Winner
- Runner-up
- Third Place
- Winner of the online plebiscite
- Eliminated in the Final
- Eliminated in the Sing-offs
- Eliminated in the Battle rounds

Coaches	Top 54 Artists							
Dawid Kwiatkowski								
Dawid Kwiatkowski	Antek Scardina	Nela Zawadzka	Kuba Szmajkowski	Amelia Janiak	Michał Makowski	Maks Więckowski	Wiktor Chmiel	Remek Janicki
Dawid Kwiatkowski	Agnieszka Nowakowska	Ania Jensen	Gabrysia Borys	Natasza Kotlarska	Olga Jagieło			
Dawid Kwiatkowski	Zuzia Janik	Wiktoria Granas	Marcelina Szlachcic	Michał Gołębiowski				
Dawid Kwiatkowski	Karolina Szczurowska	Milena Grigorian						
Tomson & Baron								
Tomson & Baron	Zuzia Jabłońska	Amelia Andryszczyk	Oliwia Kopiec	Tytus Brzeziński	Wiktoria Tracz	Eryk Waszczuk	Kamil Kilian	Staś Szymański
Tomson & Baron	Michalina Porszke	Julia Wasielewska	Maria Galińska	Julia Jasińska	Aleksandra Brzuszkiewicz			
Tomson & Baron	Michalina Włodarczyk	Emilka Piątkowska	Natalia Święczkowska	Jakub Krajkowsk				
Tomson & Baron	Oktawia Bernaś	Karolina Fryt						
Edyta Górniak								
Edyta Górniak	Roksana Węgiel	Mateusz Gędek	Natalia Zastępa	Olivia Klinke	Bartosz Peszuk	Piotr Sieczka	Krystian Gontarz	Wiktor Andrysiak
Edyta Górniak	Antek Karaś	Nailah Vitha	Alicja Dziurdziak	Swietłana Boguska				
Edyta Górniak	Emilia Chlewicka	Tomasz Gregorczyk	Milena Szypuła	Gabrysia Piotrowska	Gabriela Kurzac			
Edyta Górniak	Karolina Wójtowicz	Daria Adachowska						

== Blind auditions ==
Color key

✔	Coach hit his/her "I WANT YOU" button
	Artist defaulted to this coach's team
	Artist elected to join this coach's team
	Artist eliminated with no coach pressing his or her "I WANT YOU" button

=== Episode 1 (1 January) ===
The coaches performed "Wake Up" at the start of the show.

Order	Artist	Age	Song	Coach's and contestant's choices		
Order	Artist	Age	Song	Dawid	Tomson & Baron	Edyta
1	Nela Zawadzka	10	Meluzyna	✔	✔	✔
2	Mateusz Gędek	13	Your Song	✔	✔	✔
3	Amelia Andryszczyk	14	There's Nothing Holdin' Me Back	✔	✔	✔
4	Remek Janicki	13	Płoną góry, płoną lasy	✔		
5	Gabriela Kurzac	14	When We Were Young	✔	—	✔
6	Natasza Kotlarska	9	Pół kroku stąd	✔	✔	✔

=== Episode 2 (1 January) ===
Order	Artist	Age	Song	Coach's and contestant's choices		
Order	Artist	Age	Song	Dawid	Tomson & Baron	Edyta
1	Tytus Brzeziński	12	Uptown Funk	✔	✔	—
2	Nailah Vitha	14	Dłoń	—	—	✔
3	Gabrysia Borys	11	Shake It Off	✔	—	—
4	Lena Wlazłowska	12	Pożyczony	—	—	—
5	Anna Jensen	15	Counting Stars	✔	—	✔
6	Zuzia Jabłońska	14	7 Years	✔	✔	✔

=== Episode 3 (6 January) ===
Order	Artist	Age	Song	Coach's and contestant's choices		
Order	Artist	Age	Song	Dawid	Tomson & Baron	Edyta
1	Michalina Włodarczyk	14	Sweet Creature	✔	✔	✔
2	Ola Piotrowska	9	I Want You Back	—	—	—
3	Staś Szymański	12	One Way or Another (Teenage Kicks)	—	✔	✔
4	Olga Jagieło	13	If I Were a Boy	✔	—	—
5	Michał Gołębiowski	12	Radość najpiękniejszych lat	✔	—	✔
6	Daria Adachowska	14	If I Ain't Got You	✔	✔	✔
7	Julia Wasielewska	14	Tam gdzie ty	✔	✔	✔

=== Episode 4 (6 January) ===
Order	Artist	Age	Song	Coach's and contestant's choices		
Order	Artist	Age	Song	Dawid	Tomson & Baron	Edyta
1	Natalia Święczkowska	13	When We Were Young	✔	✔	✔
2	Bartek Peszuk	13	You Raise Me Up	—	✔	✔
3	Gabrysia Zatorska	14	Chcę zatrzymać ten czas	—	—	—
4	Kamil Kilian	13	Walks Like Rihanna	✔	—	—
5	Natalia Zastępa	14	Titanium	✔	✔	✔
6	Zuzia Janik	11	Unconditionally	✔	✔	✔

=== Episode 5 (13 January) ===
Order	Artist	Age	Song	Coach's and contestant's choices		
Order	Artist	Age	Song	Dawid	Tomson & Baron	Edyta
1	Amelia Janiak	14	If I Ain't Got You	✔	—	—
2	Wiktor Andrysiak	13	If I Were Sorry	✔	—	✔
3	Marysia Galińska	15	Tamta dziewczyna	—	✔	—
4	Wiktoria Guzek	13	2 Bajki	—	—	—
5	Julia Jasińska	13	Only Girl (In the World)	✔	✔	—
6	Wiktor Chmiel	13	Troublemaker	—	—	✔
7	Roksana Węgiel	12	Halo	✔	✔	✔

=== Episode 6 (13 January) ===
Order	Artist	Age	Song	Coach's and contestant's choices		
Order	Artist	Age	Song	Dawid	Tomson & Baron	Edyta
1	Aleksandra Brzuszkiewicz	11	You Are So Beautiful	—	✔	—
2	Michał Makowski	15	All of Me	✔	✔	✔
3	Wiktoria Granas	15	Set Fire to the Rain	✔	—	✔
4	Alicja Dziurdziak	13	Pożyczony	✔	—	✔
5	Kalina Kwiatkowska	11	Crazy	—	—	—
6	Krystian Gontarz	11	Nic do stracenia	—	✔	✔
7	Oliwia Kopiec	11	Mam tę moc	✔	✔	✔

=== Episode 7 (20 January) ===
Order	Artist	Age	Song	Coach's and contestant's choices		
Order	Artist	Age	Song	Dawid	Tomson & Baron	Edyta
1	Wiktoria Tracz	14	Rock & Rollin' Love	—	✔	✔
2	Swietłana Boguska	10	Opowiadaj mi tak	✔	✔	✔
3	Zosia Jakubiak	14	Stand By Me	—	—	—
4	Agnieszka Nowakowska	14	Faith	✔	✔	✔
5	Piotr Sieczka	15	Sugar	✔	—	—
6	Emilia Piątkowska	14	Radość najpiękniejszych lat	✔	✔	✔
7	Kuba Szmajkowski	15	There's Nothing Holdin' Me Back	✔	✔	✔

=== Episode 8 (20 January) ===
Order	Artist	Age	Song	Coach's and contestant's choices		
Order	Artist	Age	Song	Dawid	Tomson & Baron	Edyta
1	Michalina Porszke	14	I Have Nothing	✔	✔	✔
2	Oskar Gomółka	10	The Winner Takes It All	✔	✔	—
3	Emilia Chlewicka	14	Runnin' Lose It All	—	✔	✔
4	Tomasz Gregorczyk	14	Love Yourself	✔	✔	✔
5	Marcelina Szlachcic	14	Kaktus	✔	✔	✔
6	Antoni i Aleksander Parzychowscy	13	7 years	—	—	—
7	Antek Scardina	15	Can't Stop the Feeling!	✔	✔	✔

=== Episode 9 (27 January) ===
Order	Artist	Age	Song	Coach's and contestant's choices		
Order	Artist	Age	Song	Dawid	Tomson & Baron	Edyta
1	Milena Szypuła	12	Stand By Me	—	—	✔
2	Karolina Szczurowska	15	One Last Time	✔	—	✔
3	Maks Więckowski	12	Love Yourself	✔	✔	✔
4	Jakub Krajkowski	12	Za szkłem	✔	—	—
5	Zuzanna Mańkowska	14	The Scientist	—	—	—
6	Oktawia Bernaś	14	If I Were Sorry	✔	✔	✔
7	Gabriela Piotrowska	9	Kołysanka dla okruszka	✔	✔	✔

=== Episode 10 (27 January) ===
Order	Artist	Age	Song	Coach's and contestant's choices		
Order	Artist	Age	Song	Dawid	Tomson & Baron	Edyta
1	Olivia Klinke	12	Cicho	✔	✔	✔
2	Milena Grigorian	12	All About That Bass	✔	—	—
3	Karolina Wójtowicz	15	Young and Beautiful	✔	—	✔
4	Aurelia Duraj	11	Empire State of Mind	—	—	—
5	Antek Karaś	10	Aleksander Puszkin	✔	—	✔
6	Karolina Fryt	14	Love Is All Around	✔	✔	—
7	Eryk Waszczuk	11	When a Man Loves a Woman	✔	✔	✔

== The Battle Rounds ==
Color key

Artist won the Battle and advances to the Sing offs
Artist lost the Battle and was eliminated

=== Episode 11: Team Tomson & Baron (3 February) ===
The Tomson & Baron's group performed "Krąg Życia" at the start of the show.

Episode	Coach	Order	Winner(s)	Song	Losers	
Episode 11 (3 February)	Tomson & Baron	1	Michalina Porszke	Can't Feel My Face	Julia Wasielewska	Karolina Fryt
Episode 11 (3 February)	Tomson & Baron	2	Tytus Brzeziński	Dni, których nie znamy	Krystian Gontarz	Maks Więckowski
Episode 11 (3 February)	Tomson & Baron	3	Amelia Andryszczyk	Attention	Oktawia Bernaś	Michalina Włodarczyk
Episode 11 (3 February)	Tomson & Baron	4	Oliwia Kopiec	Tej historii bieg	Julia Jasińska	Aleksandra Brzuszkiewicz
Episode 11 (3 February)	Tomson & Baron	5	Wiktoria Tracz	Cryin'	Marysia Galińska	Staś Szymański
Episode 11 (3 February)	Tomson & Baron	6	Zuzia Jabłońska	I Was Here	Natalia Święczkowska	Emilia Piątkowska

Sing offs

Episode	Coach	Order	Artist	Song	Result
Episode 11 (3 February)	Tomson & Baron	1	Michalina Porszke	I Have Nothing	Eliminated
Episode 11 (3 February)	Tomson & Baron	2	Tytus Brzeziński	Uptown Funk	Eliminated
Episode 11 (3 February)	Tomson & Baron	3	Amelia Andryszczyk	There's Nothing Holdin' Me Back	Advanced
Episode 11 (3 February)	Tomson & Baron	4	Oliwia Kopiec	Mam tę moc	Advanced
Episode 11 (3 February)	Tomson & Baron	5	Wiktoria Tracz	Rock & Rollin' Love	Eliminated
Episode 11 (3 February)	Tomson & Baron	6	Zuzia Jabłońska	7 Years	Advanced

=== Episode 12: Team Edyta Górniak (10 February) ===
The Edyta's group performed "Earth Song" at the start of the show.

Episode	Coach	Order	Winner(s)	Song	Losers	
Episode 12 (10 February)	Edyta Górniak	1	Olivia Klinke	Lustro	Eryk Waszczuk	Emilia Chlewicka
Episode 12 (10 February)	Edyta Górniak	2	Bartosz Peszuk	Chained To The Rhythm	Karolina Wójtowicz	Nailah Vitha
Episode 12 (10 February)	Edyta Górniak	3	Natalia Zastępa	La La La	Tomasz Gregorczyk	Daria Adachowska
Episode 12 (10 February)	Edyta Górniak	4	Antek Karaś	Kasztany	Gabrysia Piotrowska	Swietłana Boguska
Episode 12 (10 February)	Edyta Górniak	5	Mateusz Gędek	Świecie nasz	Wiktor Chmiel	Milena Szypuła
Episode 12 (10 February)	Edyta Górniak	6	Roksana Węgiel	Wrecking Ball	Gabriela Kurzac	Alicja Dziurdziak

Sing offs

Episode	Coach	Order	Artist	Song	Result
Episode 12 (10 February)	Edyta Górniak	1	Antek Karaś	Aleksander Puszkin	Eliminated
Episode 12 (10 February)	Edyta Górniak	2	Olivia Klinke	Cicho	Eliminated
Episode 12 (10 February)	Edyta Górniak	3	Bartosz Peszuk	You Raise Me Up	Eliminated
Episode 12 (10 February)	Edyta Górniak	4	Natalia Zastępa	Titanium	Advanced
Episode 12 (10 February)	Edyta Górniak	5	Mateusz Gędek	Your Song	Advanced
Episode 12 (10 February)	Edyta Górniak	6	Roksana Węgiel	Halo	Advanced

=== Episode 13: Team Dawid Kwiatkowski (17 February) ===
The Dawid's group performed "Nie mów nie" at the start of the show.

Episode	Coach	Order	Winner(s)	Song	Losers	
Episode 13 (17 February)	Dawid Kwiatkowski	1	Nela Zawadzka	Girlfriend	Zuzia Janik	Natasza Kotlarska
Episode 13 (17 February)	Dawid Kwiatkowski	2	Amelia Janiak	Duchy tych co mieszkali tu	Kamil Kilian	Jakub Krajkowski
Episode 13 (17 February)	Dawid Kwiatkowski	3	Agnieszka Nowakowska	The Shoop Shoop Song	Wiktoria Granas	Ania Jensen
Episode 13 (17 February)	Dawid Kwiatkowski	4	Michał Makowski	Lubię wracać tam gdzie byłem	Olga Jagieło	Piotr Sieczka
Episode 13 (17 February)	Dawid Kwiatkowski	5	Kuba Szmajkowski	I Know What You Did Last Summer	Marcelina Szlachcic	Gabrysia Borys
Episode 13 (17 February)	Dawid Kwiatkowski	6	Antek Scardina	I'm Still Standing	Karolina Szczurowska	Milena Grigorian
Episode 13 (17 February)	Dawid Kwiatkowski	7	Remek Janicki	Prefect		

Sing offs

Episode	Coach	Order	Artist	Song	Result
Episode 13 (17 February)	Dawid Kwiatkowski	1	Nela Zawadzka	Meluzyna	Advanced
Episode 13 (17 February)	Dawid Kwiatkowski	2	Amelia Janiak	If I Ain't Got You	Eliminated
Episode 13 (17 February)	Dawid Kwiatkowski	3	Agnieszka Nowakowska	Faith	Eliminated
Episode 13 (17 February)	Dawid Kwiatkowski	4	Michał Makowski	All of Me	Eliminated
Episode 13 (17 February)	Dawid Kwiatkowski	5	Kuba Szmajkowski	There's Nothing Holdin' Me Back	Advanced
Episode 13 (17 February)	Dawid Kwiatkowski	6	Antek Scardina	Can't Stop the Feeling!	Advanced
Episode 13 (17 February)	Dawid Kwiatkowski	7	Remek Janicki	Perfect	Advanced

== Episode 14 Finale (24 February) ==
Color key

Artist was chosen by his/her coach
Artist was eliminated by his/her coach

=== Round 1 ===
The Final 9 and coaches performed "Wake Up" at the start of the show.

Order	Coach	Artist	Song	Result
1	Dawid Kwiatkowski	Kuba Szmajkowski	Feeling Good	Eliminated
2	Dawid Kwiatkowski	Nela Zawadzka	Co Mi Panie Dasz	Eliminated
3	Dawid Kwiatkowski	Antek Scardina	When I Was Your Man	Dawid's Choice
1	Edyta Górniak	Natalia Zastępa	Niech Żyje Bal	Eliminated
2	Edyta Górniak	Mateusz Gędek	Perfect	Eliminated
3	Edyta Górniak	Roksana Węgiel	Purple Rain	Edyta's Choice
1	Tomson & Baron	Amelia Andryszczyk	Za Późno	Eliminated
2	Tomson & Baron	Oliwia Kopiec	Mamma Knows Best	Eliminated
3	Tomson & Baron	Zuzia Jabłońska	Believer	Tomson & Baron Choice

=== Round 2 ===
Each contestant performed a cover song and their original song.

Coach	Artist	Order	Cover song	Order	Original song	Result
Dawid Kwiatkowski	Antek Scardina	1	Who's Lovin You	4	Cztery Strony Świata	Third Place
Tomson & Baron	Zuzia Jabłońska	2	Nieznajomy	6	Sami	Runner-Up
Edyta Górniak	Roksana Węgiel	3	To Nie Ja	5	Żyj	Winner

== Elimination chart ==
Artist's info

- Artist from Team Edyta Górniak
- Artist from Team Tomson & Baron
- Artist from Team Dawid Kwiatkowski

Result details

- Winner
- Runner-up
- Third Place
- Artist was saved by the public
- Artist was saved by his/her coach
- Artist was eliminated by his/her coach

Sing-offs and Live show results per week
Artist	The Sing-offs			Live shows	
Artist	Episode 11	Episode 12	Episode 13	Finals	
Artist	Episode 11	Episode 12	Episode 13	Round 1	Round 2
Roksana Węgiel	—N/a	Safe	—N/a	Safe	Winner
Zuzia Jabłońska	Safe	—N/a		Safe	Runner-up
Antek Scardina	—N/a		Safe	Safe	Third Place
Amelia Andryszczyk	Safe	—N/a		Eliminated (Finals)	—N/a
Oliwia Kopiec	Safe	—N/a		Eliminated (Finals)	—N/a
Mateusz Gędek	—N/a	Safe	—N/a	Eliminated (Finals)	—N/a
Natalia Zastępa	—N/a	Safe	—N/a	Eliminated (Finals)	—N/a
Nela Zawadzka	—N/a		Safe	Eliminated (Finals)	—N/a
Kuba Szmajkowski	—N/a		Safe	Eliminated (Finals)	—N/a
Agnieszka Nowakowska	—N/a		Eliminated (week 3)	—N/a	
Amelia Janiak	—N/a		Eliminated (week 3)	—N/a	
Michał Makowski	—N/a		Eliminated (week 3)	—N/a	
Olivia Klinke	—N/a	Eliminated (week 2)	—N/a		
Bartosz Peszuk	—N/a	Eliminated (week 2)	—N/a		
Antek Karaś	—N/a	Eliminated (week 2)	—N/a		
Michalina Porszke	Eliminated (week 1)	—N/a			
Wiktoria Tracz	Eliminated (week 1)	—N/a			
Tytus Brzeziński	Eliminated (week 1)	—N/a			
Remek Janicki	—N/a		Safe	—N/a	

=== Teams ===
Color key
Artist's info

- Team Dawid
- Team Edyta
- Team Tomson & Baron

Results details

- Winner
- Runner-up
- Third Place
- Eliminated

Artist	Battles	Sing Offs	Finale Part 1	Finale Part 2
Antek Scardina	Coach's choice	Coach's choice	Coach's choice	Third Place
Kuba Szmajkowski	Coach's choice	Coach's choice	Eliminated	
Nela Zawadzka	Coach's choice	Coach's choice	Eliminated	
Agnieszka Nowakowska	Coach's choice	Eliminated		
Amelia Janiak	Coach's choice	Eliminated		
Michał Makowski	Coach's choice	Eliminated		
Remek Janicki	Coach's choice	Coach's choice	Eliminated	
Roksana Węgiel	Coach's choice	Coach's choice	Coach's choice	Winner
Natalia Zastępa	Coach's choice	Coach's choice	Eliminated	
Mateusz Gędek	Coach's choice	Coach's choice	Eliminated	
Olivia Klinke	Coach's choice	Eliminated		
Antek Karaś	Coach's choice	Eliminated		
Bartosz Peszuk	Coach's choice	Eliminated		
Zuzia Jabłońska	Coach's choice	Coach's choice	Coach's choice	Runner-up
Amelia Andryszczyk	Coach's choice	Coach's choice	Eliminated	
Oliwia Kopiec	Coach's choice	Coach's choice	Eliminated	
Wiktoria Tracz	Coach's choice	Eliminated		
Tytus Brzeziński	Coach's choice	Eliminated		
Michalina Porszke	Coach's choice	Eliminated		

== Ratings ==
Episode		Original airdate	Production	Time slot	Viewers (in millions)
1	"The Blind Auditions 1"	January 1, 2018	1	Monday 8:00 p.m.	4.16
2	"The Blind Auditions 2"	January 1, 2018	2	Monday 9:00 p.m.	3.55
3	"The Blind Auditions 3"	January 6, 2018	3	Saturday 8:00 p.m.	4.11
4	"The Blind Auditions 4"	January 6, 2018	4	Saturday 9:00 p.m.	2.94
5	"The Blind Auditions 5"	January 13, 2018	5	Saturday 8:00 p.m.	3.83
6	"The Blind Auditions 6"	January 13, 2018	6	Saturday 9:00 p.m.	3.80
7	"The Blind Auditions 7"	January 20, 2018	7	Saturday 8:00 p.m.	4.08
8	"The Blind Auditions 8"	January 20, 2018	8	Saturday 9:00 p.m.	4.08
9	"The Blind Auditions 9"	January 27, 2018	9	Saturday 8:00 p.m.	4.27
10	"The Blind Auditions 10"	January 27, 2018	10	Saturday 9:00 p.m.	4.20
11	"The Battles 1"	February 3, 2018	11	Saturday 8:00 p.m.	5.25
12	"The Sing Offs 1"	February 3, 2018	12	Saturday 9:00 p.m.	5.25
13	"The Battles 2"	February 10, 2018	13	Saturday 8:00 p.m.	4.95
14	"The Sing Offs 2"	February 10, 2018	14	Saturday 9:00 p.m.	4.95
15	"The Battles 3"	February 17, 2018	15	Saturday 8:00 p.m.	5.24
16	"The Sing Offs 3"	February 17, 2018	16	Saturday 9:00 p.m.	5.24
17	"Finale"	February 24, 2018	17	Saturday 8:00 p.m.	5.36
18	"Live Finale Results"	February 24, 2018	18	Saturday 10:00 p.m.	3.69
