= Umami (disambiguation) =

Umami is one of the five basic tastes.

Umami may also refer to:

- Umami (film), a 2022 French-Japanese film
- Umami (Ewa Farna album), a 2021 studio album by Ewa Farna
- Umami (Hanabie. album), a 2026 studio album by Hanabie.
- DJ Umami, a Filipina American DJ
- Ridha Umami (born 2000), an Indonesian footballer
