= Perfection (disambiguation) =

Perfection is a philosophical concept related to idealism.

Perfection may also refer to:

== Film and television ==
- The Perfection, a 2018 American film
- Perfection (game show), a 2011–2015 British quiz show
- Perfection, a fictional locale in the Tremors franchise

== Music ==
- Perfection, an 1840 operetta by Stanisław Moniuszko

=== Albums ===
- Perfection (album), an album by the Murray, Allen & Carrington Power Trio
- Perfection, by Foesum, 1996
- Perfection (Sandra Bernhard EP) or the title song, 2008
- Perfection (Super Junior-M EP) or the title song, 2011

=== Songs ===
- "Perfection" (song), by Dannii Minogue and Soul Seekerz, 2005
- "Perfection", by Badfinger from Straight Up, 1971
- "Perfection", by Clint Mansell from Black Swan: Original Motion Picture Soundtrack, 2010
- "Perfection", by Oh Land from Oh Land, 2011
- "Perfection", by Oli London, 2019

== Novels ==
- Perfection (novel) by Vincenzo Latronico, shortlised for the 2025 International Booker Prize.

== Other uses ==
- Perfection (board game), a Hasbro board game
- Perfection (comics), a Marvel Comics character
- Perfection (law), a concept in property law
- Perfection Pass, Baffin Island, Nunavut, Canada
- Perfection Racing, a Danish auto racing team
- Christian perfection, a Christian doctrine

== See also ==
- Perfect (disambiguation)
- Perfectionism (disambiguation)
- Imperfect (disambiguation), including imperfection
