= Perfectibilism =

Perfectibilism or perfectibilists may refer to:

- Perfectionism (philosophy)
- Bund der Perfektibilisten, original name of the secret society of the Illuminati
