= Overachievement =

Instance of individuals who perform better or achieve more success than expected

Overachievement refers to performance or success beyond what is expected, often through intensive effort. In education, the term is applied to students whose performance is considered higher than expected from their measured intelligence, while underachievement refers to performance below such expectations. The distinction remains controversial. Perfectionism is also discussed in relation to overachievement. In workplaces, overachievers may pursue demanding projects and high standards but excessive striving can involve unrealistic expectations, long working hours, communication difficulties and burnout.

== In educational settings ==
=== Primary and secondary school ===
In educational settings, an overachiever is a student whose performance is considered higher than expected from measured intelligence, while an underachiever performs below expectations. The distinction remains controversial and the terms are not generally used by educators or psychologists.

- Both are labels which implicitly affect teacher behavior. This frequently leads the labels to become self-fulfilling prophecies.
- The labels are based on a static and incomplete understanding of the nature of intelligence. The ability to concentrate and to work in a dedicated manner cannot be separated from a person's "native" or "raw" intelligence in any meaningfully testable way.

A review of Alexandra Robbins's book describes an overachievement culture in some middle- and upper-class schools in which students may become preoccupied with success and experience physical strain. Perfectionism may also contribute to overachievement when self-worth becomes tied to success and achievement is driven by a desire to avoid failure.

=== Colleges and universities ===
Among college and university students, maladaptive perfectionism may involve setting unrealistically high personal standards and experiencing lower self-esteem when those standards are not met. Clinical psychologist Marilyn Sorenson similarly links low self-esteem with attempts to build self-worth through overachievement.

== In the workplace ==
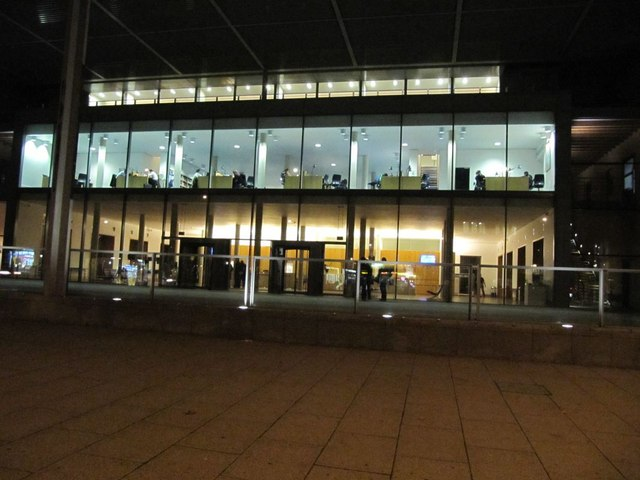
In the workplace, overachievers tend to stay late so that they can get ahead.

In workplaces, overachievers are often described as highly driven employees who take on demanding projects and pursue very high standards. Such behaviour may also involve unrealistic expectations, excessive working hours, risk-taking, poor communication and burnout. Managers may therefore need to balance the benefits of strong performance with the physical and psychological strain associated with sustained overachievement. Overachievers can still be valuable contributors to an organization when managed appropriately.

A 2004 Los Angeles Times report described methamphetamine use as a growing workplace problem and noted its use among workers in highly productive economies such as Japan and South Korea. The report also stated that the California Bar Association found methamphetamine addiction among one in four lawyers who voluntarily entered drug rehabilitation programs.

== Figurative usages of term ==
The term "overachievement" is occasionally applied in other contexts; for example, a country with an unsustainably high per capita income might be described as "overachieving". In sports, players or teams that significantly exceed the general preseason expectations for them are called "overachievers." Promotional materials and reviews for consumer products sometimes refer to products as "overachievers."

== See also ==
- Discrimination of excellence
- John Henryism
- Minority stress
- Model minority
- Perfectionism (psychology)
- Teacher's pet
