= Jakub Molęda =

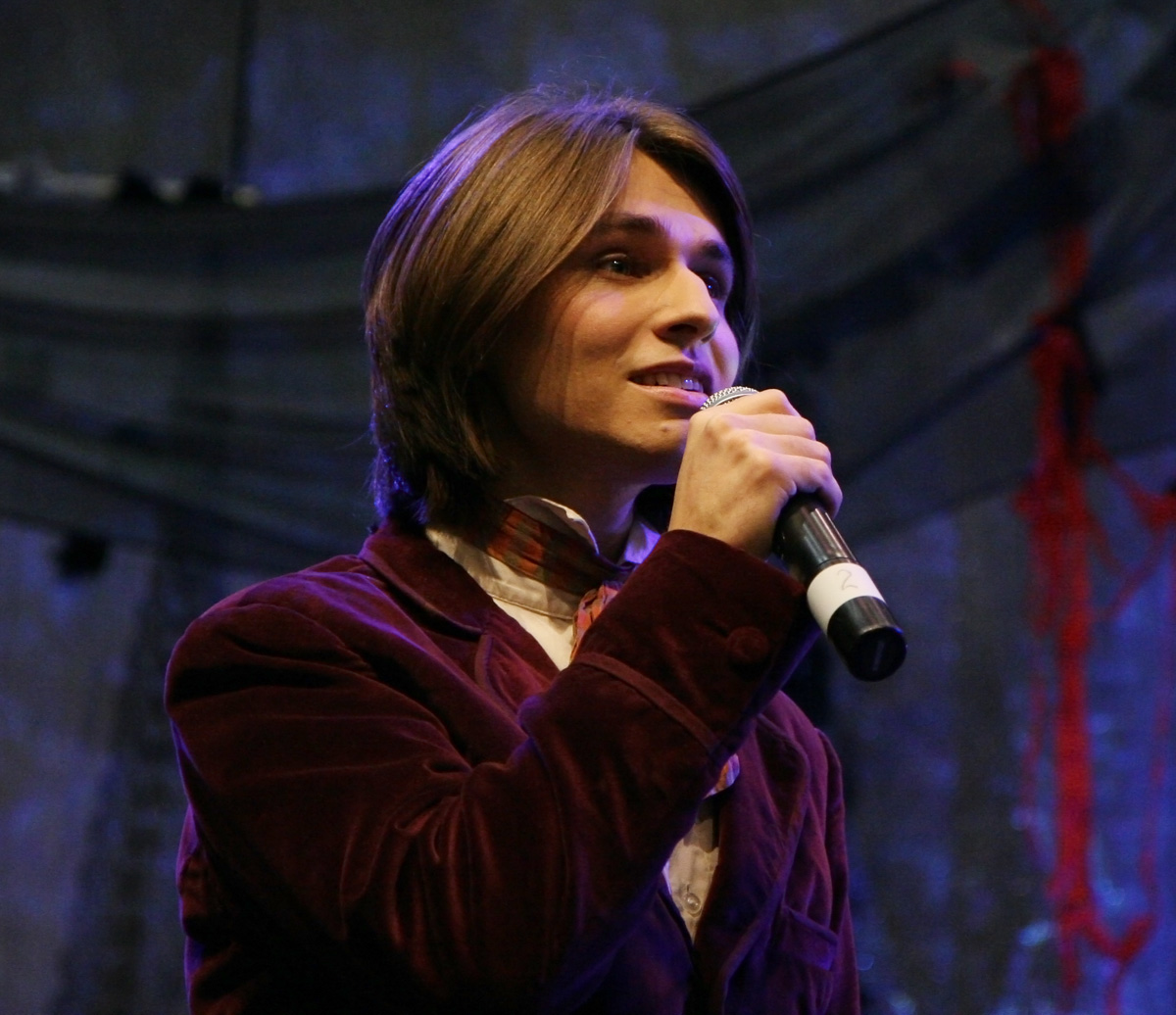
Molęda performing in a musical in Warsaw.

Jakub "Kuba" Molęda (born 3 April 1984 in Olkusz, Poland) is a Polish singer, composer and theatre actor.

He graduated from the vocalist studies program at University of Music in Katowice and studied musical education at Świętokrzyska Academy in Kielce.

At age of 7 he debuted in musical program broadcast by TVP. Molęda competed in many children's music festival contests in Poland. In 1997, he was awarded with the Złoty Aplauz (Golden Applause) Award.

He was a vocalist of the pop-rock band L.O.27, and in 1997 recorded with them first album Mogę wszystko. In 1998, he performed with the band at National Festival of Polish Song in Opole.

He has also voiced characters in Polish translations of animated films, notably the guitarist dog Bodi in the 2016 animated film Rock Dog and the lion Kovu in The Lion King II: Simba's Pride. In both cases, he provided both the singing and speaking voice.

== Discography ==
- 1997 – Mogę wszystko – Album recorded with L.O.27
- 1997 – Kolędy Molędy – Single recorded with Maciej Molęda
- 1998 – Kubuś Puchatek – Piosenki ze Stumilowego Lasu – song "Już zawsze na zawsze" recorded with Janusz Panasewicz
- 1999 – Przyjaciele – Album recorded with L.O.27
- 1999 – Zatrzymaj się – single recorded with Maciej Molęda
- 2007 – 2xM – Album by the Mollęda team
- 2008 – Camp Rock soundtrack Polish version of "This Is Me" ("Oto ja") recorded with Ewa Farna
- 2008 – Camp Rock soundtrack Polish version of "Wouldn't Change a Thing" ("Nie zmieniajmy nic") recorded with Ewa Farna
