= Thomas Hurka =

Canadian philosopher (born 1952)

- Born: August 10, 1952 (age 74); Toronto, Ontario

Philosophical work
- Era: Contemporary philosophy
- Region: Western philosophy
- School: Analytic philosophy
- Main interests: Moral philosophy
- Notable ideas: Perfectionism
- Website: thomashurka.com

Thomas Michael Hurka (born August 10, 1952) is a Canadian philosopher who holds the Jackman Distinguished Chair in Philosophical Studies at the University of Toronto. From 1978 to 2002, he taught at the University of Calgary. He has published on metaethics, normative theory, political philosophy, and applied ethics.

== Education and career ==
Thomas Hurka was born in Toronto, Ontario, on August 10, 1952, to Anthony Emmanuel Hurka (a manager) and Edith Dita née Heller (a social worker), both of whom were from Czechoslovakia. His mother fled to London as a Jewish refugee in 1939.

After graduating from the University of Toronto Schools, Hurka received a BA (honors) from the University of Toronto in 1975 and then a BPhil from Corpus Christi College, Oxford, in 1977. His 1980 DPhil from Oxford University was obtained with a thesis on "perfectionist ethics" that was supervised by R. M. Hare.

Hurka was elected a fellow of the Royal Society of Canada in 2001.

== Philosophical work ==
Hurka has published works on a number of topics, including goodness, virtue, and ethics. His philosophy focuses on the "well-rounded life". He has said that goods, which come in four basic categories—pleasure, knowledge, achievement, and virtue—matter more the less of them a person has. According to this theory, it is more appropriate to seek a balanced variety of goods instead of devoting oneself to one kind only. Hurka's conception of virtue is different from the view that an agent ought to maximize their own good, which requires being virtuous. Instead, he stresses that "agents ought to maximize the good of all, which requires conventionally right action, and as a side effect can maximize their own good".

Hurka has also studied the ethics of fighting global warming. He has maintained that if we reject the notion that individuals should only pursue their own self-interest, then we can assign ethical standing to a wider range of beings besides ourselves. This is significant in addressing global warming, because it morally pushes towards strategies of avoiding instead of adapting to climate change.

== Bibliography ==
- Principles: Short Essays on Ethics (1993)
- Perfectionism (1993)
- Virtue, Vice, and Value (2001)
- Drawing Morals: Essays in Ethical Theory (2011)
- The Best Things in Life: A Guide to What Really Matters (2011)
- British Ethical Theorists from Sidgwick to Ewing (2014)
