= Imperfect the Series 2 =

- Genre: Comedy; Drama
- Created by: Chand Parwez Servia; Fiaz Servia; Raza Servia; Ernest Prakasa
- Based on: Imperfect: A Journey to Self-Acceptance by Meira Anastasia
- Screenplay by: Ernest Prakasa; Sigit Sulistyo; Erwin Wu
- Directed by: Naya Anindita
- Creative director: Ernest Prakasa
- Starring: Kiky Saputri; Aci Resti; Zsa Zsa Utari; Neneng Wulandari; Riafinola Ifani Sari; Abun Sungkar; Ari Irham; Reza Rahadian; Ernest Prakasa; Fanny Ghassan; Uus; Bintang Emon; Arie Kriting; Morgan Oey; Oki Rengga; Randhika Djamil; Mamat Alkatiri; Ephy Sekuriti; Cinta Laura; Fadil Jaidi; Lee Jeong-hoon; Melly Goeslaw; Sogi Indra Dhuaja; Sumaisy Djaitov Yanda; Riyuka Bunga
- Composers: Ifa Fachir; Dimas Wibisana
- Country of origin: Indonesia
- Original language: Indonesian
- No. of seasons: 1
- No. of episodes: 16

Production
- Executive producers: Jeff Han; Kaichen Li; Lesley Simpson; Riza; Mithu Nusar; Reza Servia; Dido Servia
- Producers: Chand Parwez Servia; Fiaz Servia; Raza Servia
- Production locations: Jakarta, Indonesia
- Camera setup: Multi-camera
- Running time: 30–45 minutes
- Production company: Starvision Plus

Original release
- Network: WeTV; Iflix
- Release: 30 November 2022 – 19 January 2023

Related
- Imperfect the Series

Imperfect the Series 2 is an Indonesian comedy-drama television series produced by Starvision Plus. It is a sequel to Imperfect the Series, which aired from 30 November 2022 to 19 January 2023 on WeTV and Iflix.

== Plot ==
Dika decided to quit his job out of town and choose to stay at home. Dika wanted to re-launch his career as a photographer. While pursuing his profession, Dika met a woman named Chika.

Meanwhile, Maria was starting to adapt to her new job as a hijab shop assistant. One day, Maria met Bima, someone she had long admired. However, their relationship with Bima was rocky. Then, another man entered Maria's life. This man took an interest in Maria.

Meanwhile, Neeti was busy looking for a new job outside of her role as a makeup artist. Then there was Endah, who had always been infatuated with K-Pop idols.

== Cast ==
- Kiky Saputri as Neeti
- Aci Resti as Prita
- Neneng Wulandari as Endah
- Riafinola Ifani Sari as Ratna
- Abun Sungkar as Adit
- Ari Irham as Bima
- Reza Rahadian as Dika
- Ernest Prakasa as Teddy
- Fanny Ghassani as Michelle
- Uus as Ali
- Bintang Emon as Doni Setiono
- Arie Kriting as Yoseph
- Morgan Oey as Chaesar
- Oki Rengga as Togar
- Randhika Djamil as Cahyo
- Mamat Alkatiri as John
- Ephy Sekuriti as David
- Cinta Laura as Chika Cihuy
- Fadil Jaidi as Berry
- Lee Jeong-hoon as Soo Young
- Melly Goeslaw as Mila
- Sogi Indra Dhuaja as Tommy
- Sumaisy Djaitov Yanda as Ricky

== Production ==
=== Development ===
In September 2022, WeTV announced a new series titled Imperfect the Series 2.

=== Casting ===
Kiky Saputri who played Neeti reprise her role. Cinta Laura was roped to play Chika Cihuy. Reza Rahardian to join the series as Dika. Fanny Ghassani was selected to play Michelle.
