= Perfekt =

Perfekt may refer to:

- Perfekt, one of the German verb tenses
- "Perfekt", song by Die Ärzte from Jazz ist anders

== See also ==
- Perfect (disambiguation)
