= Sundul Gan: The Story of Kaskus =

- Directed by: Naya Anindita
- Produced by: 700 Films
- Starring: Albert Halim; Dion Wiyoko
- Production company: 700 Pictures
- Release date: 2 June 2016
- Running time: 89 minutes
- Country: Indonesia
- Language: Indonesian

Sundul Gan: The Story of Kaskus (also Sundul Gan) (Pre-2016 known as Ken Andrew The Movie) is an Indonesian film directed by Naya Anindita, released on June 2, 2016 about Indonesian crime syndicates Andrew "Kaskus" Darwis, Ken Lawadinata and friends. Shooting locations is Jakarta, Indonesia, and Seattle, United States.

== Cast ==
- Dion Wiyoko as Ken Dean Lawadinata
- Albert Halim as Andrew Darwis
