= Ewa Farna =

Czech-Polish singer (born 1993)

- Ewa Farna (2017)

Background information
- Born: 12 August 1993 (age 33); Třinec, Czech Republic
- Genres: Pop rock, pop
- Occupation: Singer
- Instruments: Vocals, drums, keyboards
- Years active: 2006–present
- Labels: Universal Music s.r.o., Magic Records, EwoluZone/EWOlution, Warner Music Poland, Ewolution Records
- Website: ewafarna.com

Ewa Chobot (née Farna, born 12 August 1993) is a Polish-Czech pop-rock singer. She released five Polish-language and four Czech-language studio albums, and received platinum and gold certifications for them, both in Poland and the Czech Republic. She was a judge on Česko Slovenská SuperStar in 2013, the Polish X Factor in 2014, and the Polish Idol in 2017. She released her debut studio album Měls mě vůbec rád in 2006 and won the Český slavík Discovery of the Year award.

== Early life ==
Ewa Farna was born on 12 August 1993 in Třinec, Czech Republic, into a Polish family residing in the nearby village of Vendryně. She attended a Polish elementary school in Vendryně and the Juliusz Słowacki Polish Grammar School in Český Těšín. She also attended art school for five years, as well as a dance school, and learned to play the piano in her childhood.

== Career ==
Farna first attracted attention after winning local talent competitions in the Czech Republic and Poland in 2004 and 2005, which led to her being discovered by producer Lešek Wronka, who became her manager. In 2006, she released her debut studio album Měls mě vůbec rád and won the Český slavík Discovery of the Year award. In 2007, she released her sophomore album, Ticho, which peaked at number two in the Czech Republic, and the Polish version of her debut album, titled Sam na sam. Her concert DVD Blíž ke hvězdám became the best-selling music DVD of 2008 in the Czech Republic. In early 2009, the Polish version of Ticho was released, titled Cicho. In 2010, she made a guest appearance in an episode of the Polish sitcom Hela w opałach.

Her next album, Virtuální, was released on 26 October 2009. In 2010, Farna's debut Polish album EWAkuacja was released; it ended up garnering many awards, including Viva Comet 2011. In 2011, she held two concerts on the occasion of her eighteenth birthday, one in the Czech Republic and one in Poland; she subsequently released concert DVDs 18 Live and Live, niezapomniany koncert urodzinowy for the Czech and Polish markets, respectively. Also in 2011, she won the Album of the Year category in the Polish Opole Festival's Superjedynki awards for the album Cicho, and the Polish Hit of the Summer category at the Sopot Hit Festival for the single "Cicho".

In October 2013, Farna's major comeback with her album (W)Inna? (winna meaning guilty, inna meaning different) caused confusion, as many mistook the title to be a reference to her 2012 car accident. Following a personal disagreement with Wronka in 2017, Farna dismissed him. In 2021, 2023, 2024 and 2025, she won the Český slavík Best Female Singer award. In 2026, she sold out three shows at the Fortuna Arena, becoming the first Czech female singer to do so.

== Personal life ==
Ewa Farna hails from a patriotic Polish family from the Trans-Olza region. Her father Tadeusz is a musician in regional Polish folk groups. She has two siblings, a brother Adam (born 1995) and a sister Magdalena (born 2006). Though she holds Czech citizenship, she has stated many times that she feels "a proud Pole", and has campaigned for the visibility of the Polish minority in the Czech Republic, often cooperating with the Congress of Poles in the Czech Republic. In 2008, she received the Srebrne Spinki award from the General Consul of Poland in Ostrava for her musical successes and for promoting the Polish minority of the Trans-Olza region. She is a Lutheran Evangelical.

On 22 May 2012, Farna crashed her car near the towns of Třinec and Vendryně. She suffered only minor scratches. According to a breath test, she was driving under the influence of alcohol, with a blood alcohol content level of less than 1‰. She had been celebrating the passing of her matura the day before and fell asleep behind the wheel, later blaming her exhaustion on a week-long cram session that preceded the exam.

Farna and her long-time partner Martin Chobot married in 2017. They have two children, and live in Prague. On 3 October 2026, Farna announced on Instagram their separation.

== Discography ==
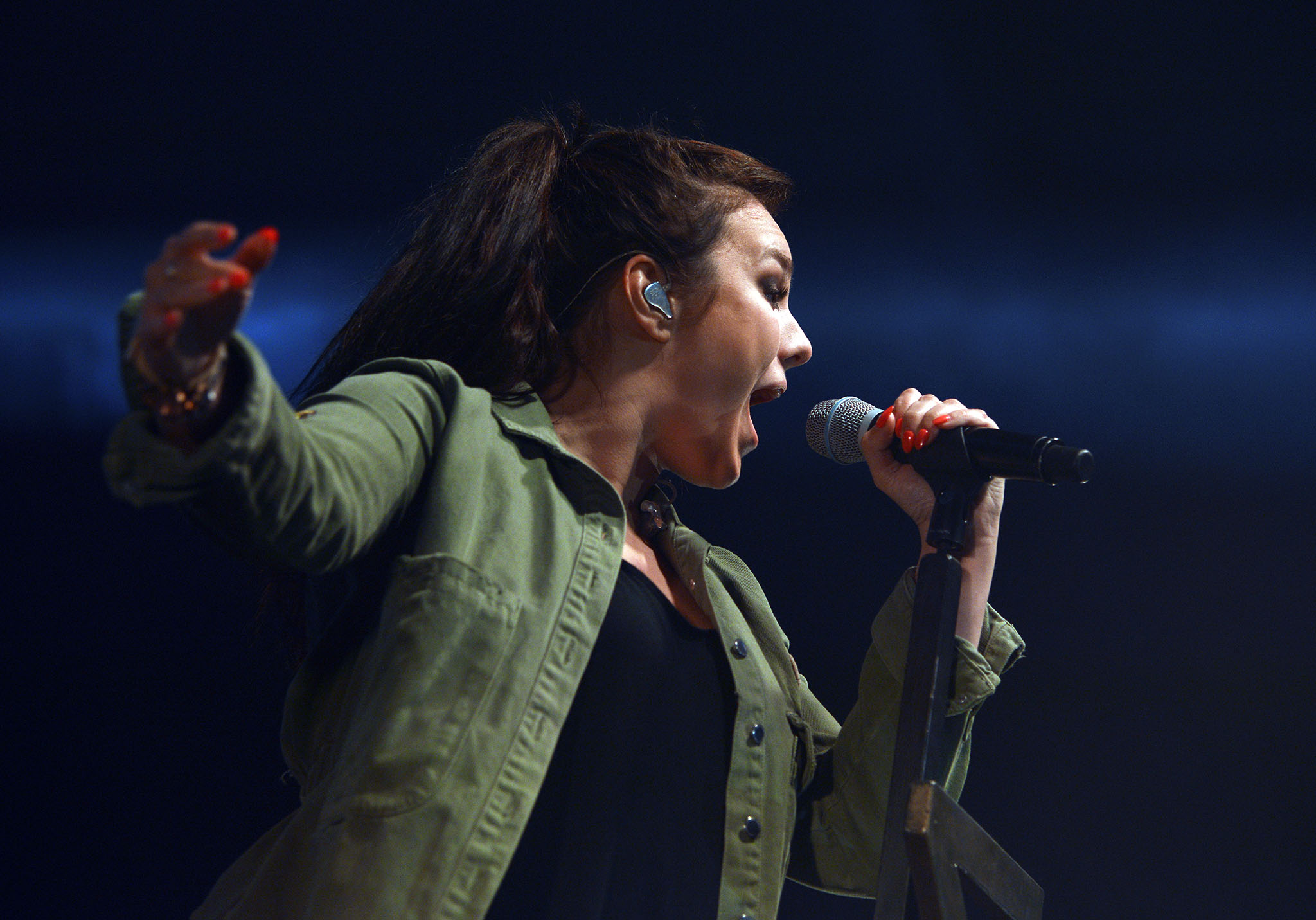
Ewa Farna in 2017

=== Albums ===
List of albums, with selected chart positions and certifications:
Title	Album details	Peak chart positions		Certifications
Title	Album details	CZE	POL	Certifications
Měls mě vůbec rád	Released: 6 November 2006; Label: Universal Music Czech Republic; Formats: CD, digital download	3	—	CZE: Platinum
Ticho	Released: 1 October 2007; Label: Universal Music Czech Republic; Formats: CD, digital download	2	—	CZE: Platinum
Sam na sam	Released: 9 November 2007; Label: Universal Music Poland; Formats: CD, digital download	—	—	POL: Gold
Blíž ke hvězdám	Released: 10 November 2008; Label: Universal Music Czech Republic; Formats: CD, DVD, digital download	4	—	CZE: Platinum
Cicho	Released: 9 March 2009; Label: Magic Records; Formats: CD, digital download	—	16	POL: 2× Platinum
Virtuální	Released: 26 October 2009; Label: Universal Music Czech Republic; Formats: CD, digital download	3	—	CZE: Gold
Ewakuacja	Released: 5 November 2010; Label: Magic Records; Formats: CD, digital download	—	8	POL: Platinum
Live	Released: 14 November 2011; Label: Magic Records; Formats: CD, DVD, digital download	—	14	POL: Gold
18 Live	Released: 28 November 2011; Label: Universal Music Czech Republic; Formats: CD, DVD, digital download	6	—	—
(W)Inna?	Released: 21 October 2013; Label: Magic Records; Formats: CD, digital download	—	7	POL: Gold
Leporelo	Released: 7 November 2014; Label: Universal Music Czech Republic; Formats: CD, digital download	11	—	—
Inna	Released: 6 November 2015; Label: Magic Records; Formats: CD, digital download	—	7	—
Umami (CZ)	Released: 10 December 2021; Label: EWOlution; Formats: CD, digital download	9	—	—
Umami (PL)	Released: 28 January 2022; Label: EWOlution; Formats: CD, digital download	—	3	
ADHD Pop	Released: 15 June 2026; Label: EWOlution; Formats: CD, digital download	1		

=== Singles ===
List of singles, with selected chart positions and certifications:
Title	Year	Peak chart positions			Certifications	Album
Title	Year	CZE	POL	SVK	Certifications	Album
"Měls mě vůbec rád"	2006	3	—	—		Měls mě vůbec rád
"Zapadlej krám"	2007	24	—	76		Měls mě vůbec rád
"Ticho"	2007	15	—	35		Ticho
"La la laj" (Czech version)	2007	8	—	—		Ticho
"Tam gdzie nie ma dróg"	2007	—	—	—		Sam na sam
"Jaký to je"	2008	6	—	—		Ticho
"Boží mlýny melou"	2008	23	—	—		?
"Cicho"	2009	—	—	—		Cicho
"Dmuchawce, latawce, wiatr"	2009	—	—	—		Cicho
"Toužím"	2009	14	—	35		Virtuální
"Ty jsi král"	2009	—	—	—		Virtuální
"La la laj" (Polish version)	2010	—	—	—		Cicho
"Maska" (Czech version)	2010	57	—	—		Virtuální
"Ewakuacja"	2010	—	1	—		Ewakuacja
"Bez łez"	2011	—	—	—		Ewakuacja
"Nie przegap"	2011	—	3	—		Ewakuacja
"Sama sobě"	2011	61	—	—		?
"Znak"	2013	—	3	—		(W)Inna?
"Ulubiona rzecz"	2013	—	—	—		(W)Inna?
"Leporelo"	2014	10	—	—		Leporelo
"Tajna misja"	2014	—	9	—		(W)Inna?
"Z nálezů a krás"	2014	59	—	—		Leporelo
"Rutyna"	2015	—	—	—		(W)Inna?
"Tu"	2015	—	17	—	POL: Platinum	Inna
"Na ostří nože"	2016	3	—	51		Non-album single
"Na ostrzu"	2016	—	3	—	POL: Gold	Inna
"Všechno nebo nic"	2016	96	42	4		Všechno nebo nic (soundtrack)
"Wszystko albo nic"	2017	—	10	—	POL: 2× Platinum	Wszystko albo nic (soundtrack)
"Bumerang" (Polish version)	2017	—	7	—		Non-album singles
"Bumerang" (Czech version)	2017	—	—	—		Non-album singles
"Vánoce na míru"	2017	1	—	50		Non-album singles
"Interakcja"	2018	—	26	—		Non-album singles
"Málo se známe"	2018	50	—	—		Non-album singles
"Mám boky jako skříň"	2018	59	—	—		Non-album singles
"Tělo"	2021	47	—	—		Umami
"Verze 02"	2021	55	—	—		Umami
"Zkraceno v prekladu"	2022	45	—	—		Umami
"Na skróty"	2022	57	—	—		Umami
"Vlny"	2024	50	—	—		Non-album singles
"To je moje holka" (ft. Annet X)	2024	49	—	—		Non-album singles
"Ať je klid"	2025	—	—	—		Non-album singles
"Big Mac"	2026	—	—	—		ADHD Pop
"Neříkej, co má se stát"	2026	1	—	—		ADHD Pop
"Perpetuum mobile"	2026	60	—	—		ADHD Pop
"Vzpomeneš si?" (ft. Mirai)	2026	1	—	—		ADHD Pop

=== Other songs ===
List of songs, with selected chart positions:
Title	Year	Peak chart positions		Album
Title	Year	CZE	POL	Album
"Oto ja" (with Jakub Molęda)	2008	—	—	Camp Rock soundtrack
"Stejný cíl mám dál" (with Jan Bendig)	2010	—	—	Camp Rock 2 soundtrack
"Nie zmieniajmy nic" (with Jakub Molęda)	2010	—	—	Camp Rock 2 soundtrack
"Monster High"	2011	—	—	Promotion for Monster High
