= Young Shanty =

American singer

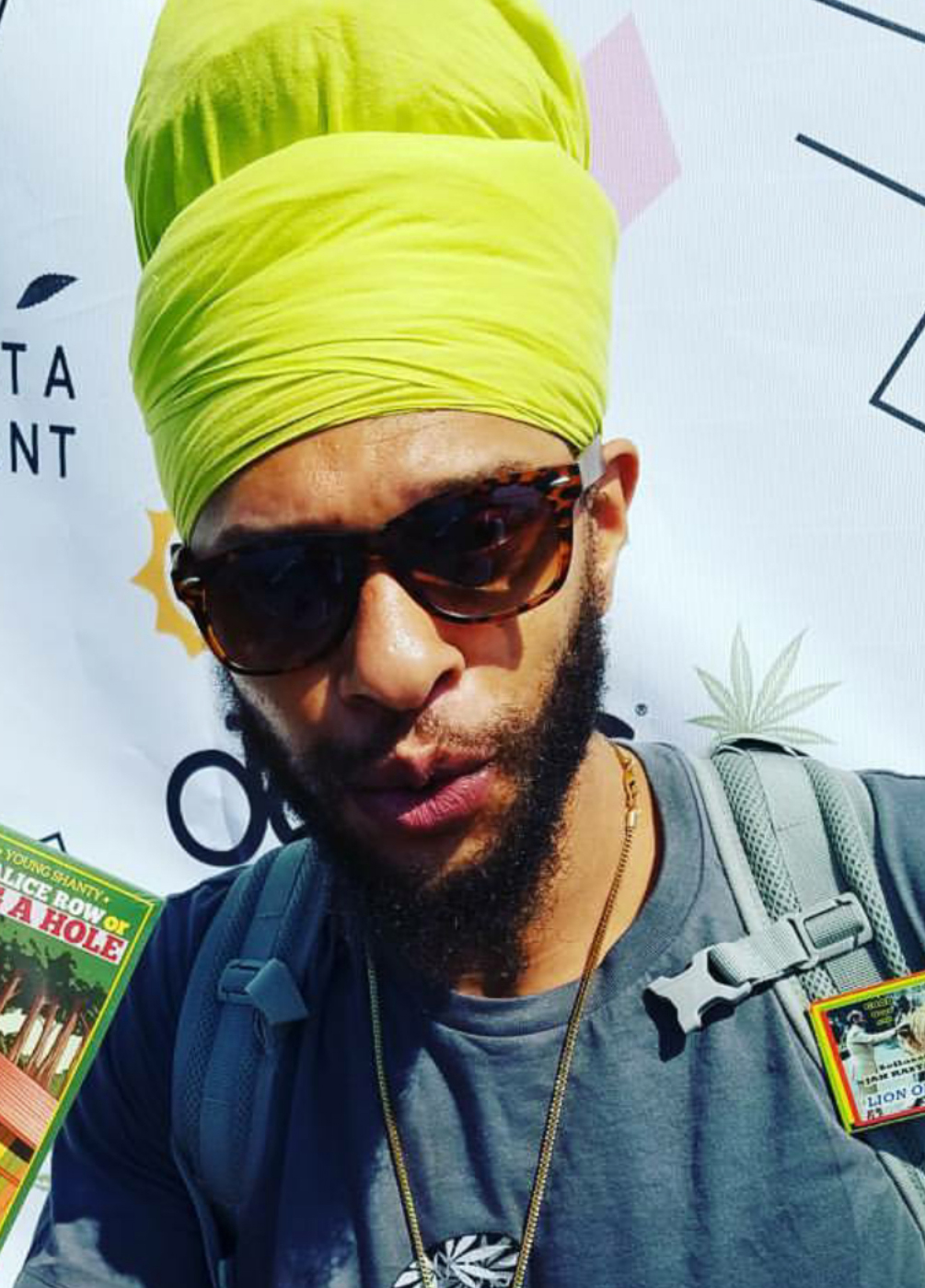

Background information
- Also known as: Young Shanty, Ras Iyahson
- Born: Jason Raymond Cannon; December 16, 1980 (age 45)
- Origin: San Francisco Bay Area, California, U.S.
- Genres: Reggae, dancehall, Roots Reggae,
- Occupations: Musician, Songwriter, Producer
- Instruments: Percussionist, Kette Drum
- Years active: Late 2007 – present
- Labels: Giddimani Records, Chalice Row Unlimited

Jason Raymond Cannon (born December 16, 1980), better known as Young Shanty, is an American reggae and dancehall musician. His album Chalice Row or Dig a Hole debuted at the number one spot and spent three weeks on Billboard's reggae albums charts.

== Music career ==
=== Early years ===
Cannon began his career as the lead singer in a band called Starliner. Together they released an album in 2007 dubbed Lion Fyah. After this venture he embarked on a solo career using the stage name Ras Iyahson and released an album called More Hot in June 2009.

=== Ras Iyahson to Young Shanty ===
In 2012 Cannon changed his name to Young Shanty and embarked on the third phase of his career. In 2016, he released an EP titled Chalice Row or Dig a Hole. In 2017, Young Shanty released a single called "More Weed", which featured Sizzla and Ras Rap. He has appeared on shows in Hawaii and Canada as well as several performances on the West Coast of the United States. Young Shanty shared stages with artists such as Dead Prez, Wu-Tang Clan, Cappadonna, Killah Priest, Kymani Marley, Beenie Man, Inner Circle (band) and Half Pint.

== Billboard debut ==
On April 12, 2017. Young Shanty's EP Chalice Row or Dig a Hole debuted at number 1 and spent three weeks on Billboard's reggae albums charts. This EP was produced by Giddimani Records. It had seven tracks with features from Perfect Giddimani, Teflon and Jahdan Blakkamoore. In August 2016, Chalice Row or Dig a Hole was released on compact disc as a combined effort between Chalice Row Unlimited and Giddimani Records.

== Discography ==
=== Album ===
EP
Title	Release date	Label	Format
More Hot	June 22, 2009	BeatsGalore Records	Digital Distribution, Compact Disc
Up on Mars	January 1, 2014	Chalice Row Records	Digital Distribution, Compact Disc
Chalice Row or Dig a Hole	June 10, 2016	Giddimani Records / Chalice Row Records	Digital Distribution, Compact Disc
Smokers Music Vol 1	June 30, 2017	Chalice Row Records / Giddimani Records	Digital Distribution, Compact Disc
Poor Cant Take No More	November 23, 2018	Giddimani Records / Chalice Row Records	Digital Distribution,
In My Head	April 19, 2019	Chalice Row Records / Giddimani Records	Digital Distribution,

=== Singles ===
Singles
Title	Label	Release year	Format
"Kush n Grabba"	Chalice Row Records	2015	Digital Distribution
"Got Trees"	Giddimani Records	2015	Digital Distribution
"I Try"	Giddimani Records	2016	Digital Distribution
"Last Hit" (feat. Jahdan Blakkamoore)	Giddimani Records	2016	Digital Distribution
"Nugs & Kisses"	Giddimani Records	2017	Digital Distribution
"The Poor Cant Take No More"	Chalice Row Records	2018	Digital Distribution
"Nothing but the High Grade" (Young Shanty & Tikaf)	Chalice Row Records	2019	Digital Distribution
"Stand Out"	Chalice Row Records	2019	Digital Distribution
"Get Up Child"	Chalice Row Records / Giddimani Records	2020	Digital Distribution

=== Various-artists compilations ===
Various-artists compilations
Artist	Title	Song/s	Release date	Label
Various artists	Bay Area Riddim	"Pretty Lady"	2016	Giddimani Records
Various artists	Horn of Africa Riddim	"I Try"	2016	Giddimani Records
Various artists	Reggae Robin Riddim	"Same Lane"	2016	Upsetta Records
Various artists	Nike Ear Riddim	"Keep Working"	2017	Giddimani Records
Various artists	Live Clean Riddim	"Dont Tell Me That"	2021	Rally Up Music
Various artists	Big Chune Riddim	"Spread Love"	2021	Giddimani Records
Various artists	Black Roses Riddim	"Zion"	2021	Chalice Row Records
