= Perfectionism =

Perfectionism may refer to:

- Perfectionism (psychology), a personality trait
- Perfectionism (philosophy), a persistence of will
- Christian perfection, a doctrine taught in Methodism and Quakerism
- Perfectionist movement; see Oneida Community, a Christian sect
- Perfectionist (album), by Natalia Kills
- "Perfectionism", song by Jay Chou from the 2000 album Jay
- Mr. Perfectionist, nickname of Indian actor Amir Khan (born 1965)

== See also ==
- Perfect (disambiguation)
- Perfection (disambiguation)
- Imperfect (disambiguation), including imperfection and imperfectionist
