= DJ Umami =

Filipina-American DJ

Ieanna Cruz, known professionally as DJ Umami, is a Filipina American deejay who has held residencies playing for the Golden State Warriors and the San Francisco Giants. She is known for her sets that focus on regional hits and artists, such as "Blow the Whistle" by Too $hort. DJ Umami is a founding member of The Peaches Crew, an all female-identified group of dee jays from the San Francisco Bay Area. As dee jaying is dominated by men, DJ Umami is noted not only as an accomplished woman in the field but also a cultural influencer in the Bay Area.

== Early life ==
DJ Umami was born and raised in East San Jose, California.

== Career ==
A lifelong music fan, DJ Umami was mentored by Paolo "Cutso" Bello, a fellow dee jay from San Jose. In 2009, Germel Boado (“G-Wrex”) invited DJ Umami to spin at a party; she declined at first until she finally accepted on May 15 that same year. Initially, DJ Umami performed using her first name. However, shortly after her first professional gig, she chose the name "Umami," after a friend suggested that she might like umami, the Japanese spice.

An early break came when DJ Umami spun at the Nike Women's half marathon in San Francisco before 20,000+ people. She also performed at Skylark in San Francisco.

In 2012, DJ Umami started working part-time as a rotating DJ for the Golden State Warriors. Four years later, she left her full-time job in tech sales in order to pursue music full-time. After he left his role with the Warriors, Marco Nicola invited DJ Umami to work weekends for the San Francisco Giants when he took a new role there in 2019. The team was looking for a high energy DJ post-COVID-19. DJ Umami became a resident DJ for the Giants, where she performs sets in right center field at Oracle Park during home games. She is known for playing Bay Area favorites, such as Blow The Whistle by Too $hort, and not traditional ballpark songs, like "Take Me Out to the Ballgame," in order to generate energy in the park.

In addition to her work for the San Francisco Giants, DJ Umami has opened for musicians Questlove and Anderson.Paak.

=== The Peaches Crew ===
DJ Umami is a founding member of The Peaches Crew, a multi-ethnic and multi-racial all-women's DJ group based in the San Francisco Bay Area. The group was formally established in 2009.

== Personal life ==
DJ Umami's parents immigrated to the United States from the Philippines, and her parents have helped her raise her two sons in Oakland.
