= Imperfect the Series =

- Genre: Comedy; Drama
- Created by: Chand Parwez Servia; Ernest Prakasa; Fiaz Servia
- Based on: Imperfect: A Journey to Self-Acceptance by Meira Anastasia
- Screenplay by: Ernest Prakasa; Sigit Sulistyo; Erwin Wu
- Directed by: Naya Anindita
- Creative director: Ernest Prakasa
- Starring: Kiky Saputri; Aci Resti; Zsa Zsa Utari; Neneng Wulandari; Dewi Irawan
- Theme music composer: Ifa Fachir; Dimas Wibisana
- Opening theme: "Tak Harus Sempurna" - Kiky Saputri, Aci Resti, Zsa Zsa Utari, Neneng Wulandari
- Ending theme: "Peluk Untuk Pelikmu" - Fiersa Besari
- Composer: Andhika Triyadi
- Country of origin: Indonesia
- Original language: Indonesian
- No. of seasons: 1
- No. of episodes: 12

Production
- Executive producers: Riza; Mithu Nusar; Reza Servia; Dido Servia; Jeff Han; Kaichen Li; Lesley Simpson
- Producers: Chand Parwez Servia; Ernest Prakasa; Fiaz Servia
- Production locations: Jakarta, Indonesia
- Cinematography: Robby Herbi
- Editors: Ryan Purwoko; Dicky Kurniawan
- Camera setup: Single-camera
- Running time: 25–38 minutes
- Production company: Starvision Plus

Original release
- Network: WeTV iflix
- Release: 27 January – 4 March 2021

Related
- Imperfect: Karier, Cinta & Timbangan; Imperfect the Series 2

Imperfect the Series is an Indonesian comedy-drama television series produced by Chand Parwez Servia, Fiaz Servia and Ernest Prakasa under the banner Starvision Plus. The series which aired from 27 January 2021 to 4 March 2021 on WeTV. This series is a spin-off of the boarding house gang story in the 2019 film Imperfect: Karier, Cinta & Timbangan.

== Plot ==
Four girls living in a crowded neighborhood in Jakarta are Maria, Neeti, Endah, and Prita No Limit. Each has their own story and character.

Maria is a girl from Merauke who came all the way to Jakarta to join her older brother, Yosep. Yosep and his friends are Easterners, as we often see them: fierce, loud-talking, and feared.

Maria falls in love with Bima, a young nurse who is the nephew of Mrs. Ratih, their landlady.

Neeti is a celebrity makeup artist who is dating an actor (extra) named Doni. Neti is a typical young Indonesian who is often blinded by love.

She is willing to spend money for her lover. However, unfortunately, their relationship ends. Neti is heartbroken when Doni finds out she was having an affair and is left to marry. This heartbreak leaves her with no desire to live.

Another boarder is Endah, a Sundanese student and a K-Pop fan with a large collection of posters. Endah is a kind child who is vulnerable to bullying and exploitation.

She is also often arranged marriages by her parents, like most village girls. Unfortunately, Endah is arranged marriages with a male boss.

Another boarding house resident is Prita No Limit, who works as a mobile phone credit shop attendant. This outspoken woman tends to be indifferent and manly.

She doesn't like to dress up, enjoys playing games, and doesn't pay much attention to her appearance. However, she cares deeply about her friends and family. She has a slight problem with her younger sister, who is the opposite: beautiful, a TikTok star, and very concerned about her appearance.

== Cast ==
- Kiky Saputri as Neeti
- Aci Resti as Prita
- Neneng Wulandari as Endah
- Dewi Irawan as Ibu Ratih
- Ari Irham as Bima
- Reza Rahadian as Dika
- Ernest Prakasa as Teddy
- Bintang Emon as Doni Setiono
- Arie Kriting as Yoseph
- Morgan Oey as Chaesar
- Adinda Azani as Beby
- Oki Rengga as Togar
- Randhika Djamil as Cahyo
- Mamat Alkatiri as John
- Ephy Sekuriti as David
- Amel Carla as Jeje
- Novita Inong as Mbak Warteg
- Rachman Avri as Rohman van Basten
- Bella Graceva as Riska Meong
- Kezia Aletheia as Laksani Kurniasih
- Uus as Ali
- Denny Gitong as Heri
- Muhammad Rizal Hamidi as Heru
- Mumuk Gomez as Nabila
- Yudha Keling as Adam
- Indra Jegel as Taufik
- Martin Anugrah as Anton
- Awwe as Toni Andrean
- David Nurbianto as Candra
- Topenk as Pelayan kedai kopi
- Badriyah Afiff as Devi
- Reza Chandika as Oji
- Sal Priadi as Gilang
- Heri Horeh as Roy
- Sahil Mulachela as Yudi
- Yasmin Napper as Lulu Ranaya
- Bella Kuku Tanesia as Sonya Jengjot Jelita
- Regina Phoenix as Shaniaduhay
- Afgan Syahreza as Afgan
- Clara Bernadeth as Marsha
- Karina Nadila as Irene
- Devina Aureel as Wiwid
- Arif Alfiansyah as DJ Ambret
- Ardit Erwandha as Ardit Erwandha
- Raditz Kazama as Iwan
- Billy W. Polii as Mansur
- Pamela Bowie as Pacar Ali
- Sadana Agung as Jaya
- Joe Project P as Abah Endah
- Lilis Suganda as Ambu Endah
- Emmie Lemu as Ibu Nabila
- Dede Sunandar as Penghulu
- Teddy Snada as Arief Bangkit Kurnia
- Tenno Ali as Baba Latip
- Arif Brata as Daniel
- Rigen as Andi
- Cut Ashifa as Anin
- Dicky Difie as Respondent
- Azzura Pinkania Imanda as Yona
- Roy Marten as Roy Marten
- Yenni Agung as Ibu Mila
- Putri Nere as Lisa Waromi
- Naya Anindita as Nurse
- Marco ZS as dr. Agus

== Production ==
=== Development ===
This series was hampered during filming due to the COVID-19 pandemic.

=== Casting ===
Kiky Saputri was selected to play female lead, Neeti. Ari Irham was confirmed to play Bima.

== Sequel ==
WeTV announced a sequel in September 2021 titled Imperfect the Series 2, starring Kiky Saputri, Aci Resti and Neneng Wulandari.
