= Perfect (musician) =

Perfect Giddimani
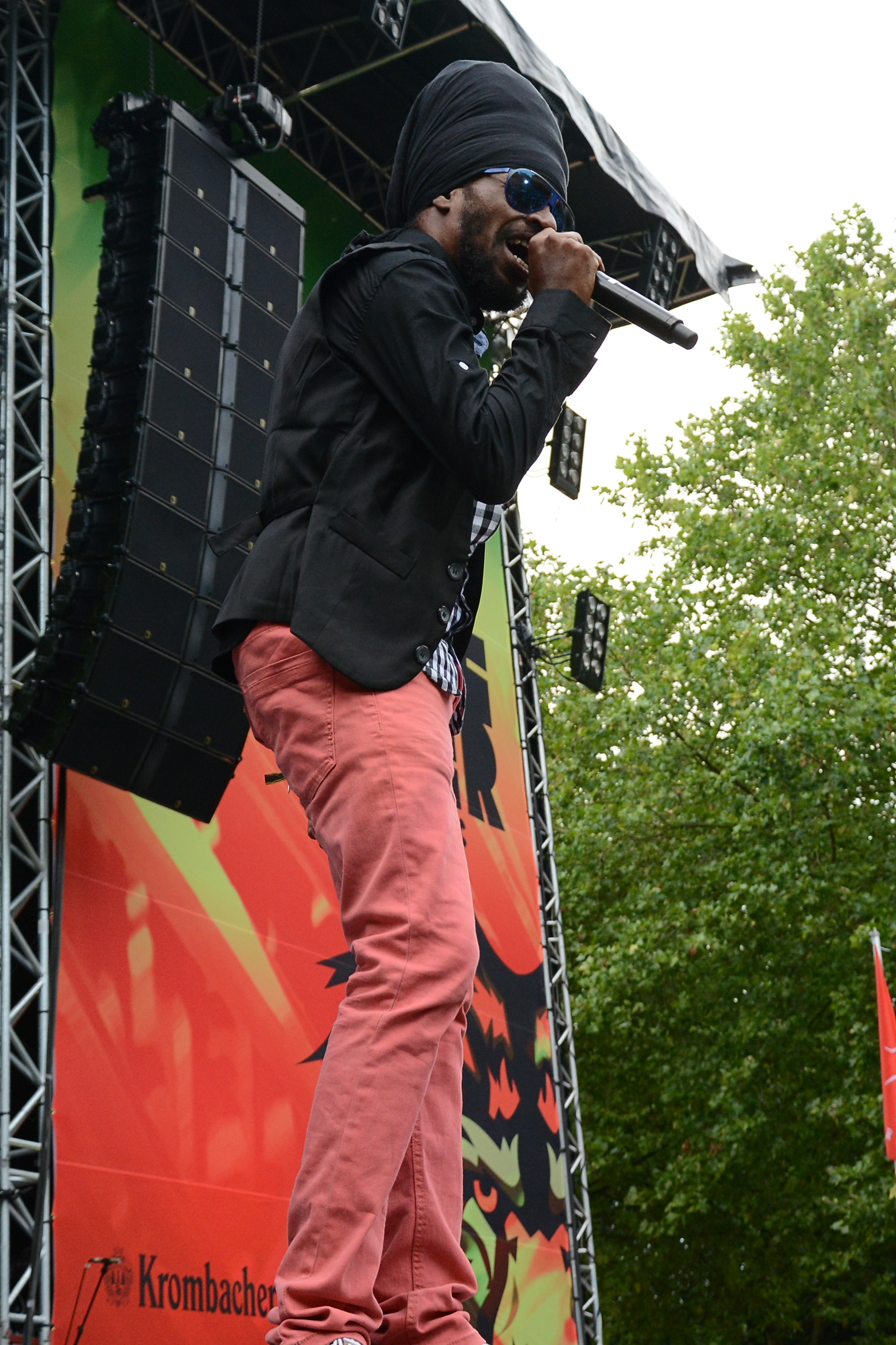
- Perfect Giddimani at Ruhr Reggae Summer 2014 in Mülheim

Background information
- Also known as: Perfect, Mr. Perfect, Little Ninja, Perfect Giddimani
- Born: Greg Rose; 26 March 1980 (age 46)
- Origin: St Ann's Bay/Parish, Jamaica
- Genre: Reggae
- Occupations: Singer, Record producer
- Years active: 2000-present
- Labels: Giddimani Records, VP Records
- Website: https://www.perfectgiddimani.com/

Greg Rose (born 26 March 1980), better known by his stage name Perfect Giddimani, Mr. Perfect or simply Perfect is a Jamaican reggae singer. He has gained worldwide recognition for his reggae hit "Hand Cart Bwoy" which entered the Jamaican charts in 2004 and created a wave of support for local peddlers who ply their wares in the markets and on the streets.

== Biography ==
Perfect (born Greg Rose) is the third child in a family of four children. He grew up in Bamboo, a community located in the parish of St. Ann, Jamaica. Perfect recorded his first tune as Little Ninja, before changing his stage name to Mr. Perfect then subsequently Perfect Giddimani.

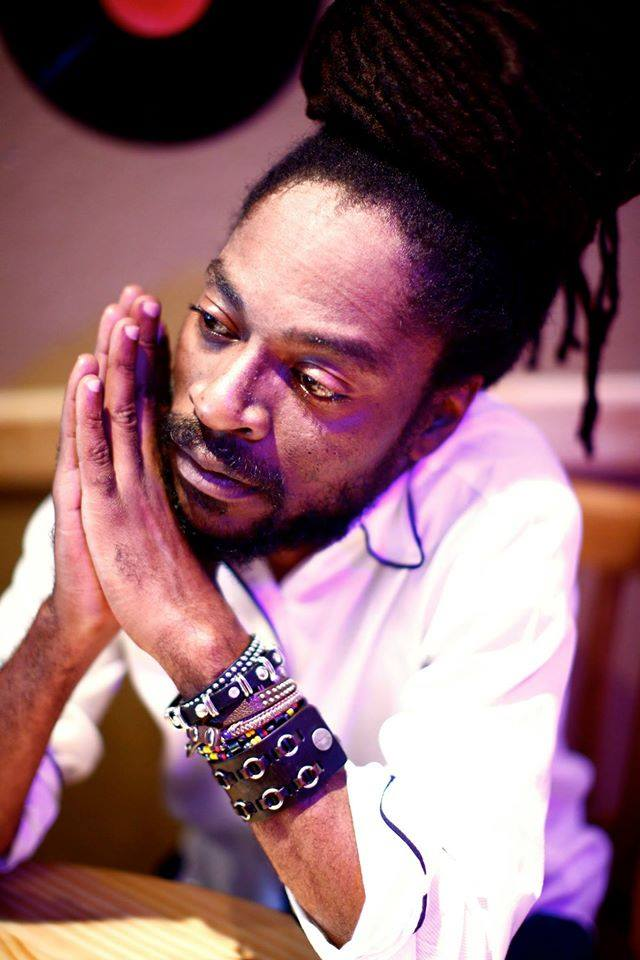
Perfect Giddimani portrait © Taylor Sperring

Perfect Giddimani began deejaying on a sound system called "Trend Setter" which originated in Bamboo where he lived. It was for this sound system that he recorded his first set of dubplates. He attended York Castle High School before relocating to Kingston. The first song that highlighted his name was "Lock Me Up" in 2004 but his break through came with "Hand Cart Bwoy" in 2005. He released his first album Giddimani, the next year. The Austrian record label Irie vibrations released his second album Born Dead With Life, in 2008.

In April 2017, Perfect Giddimani was featured on Young Shanty's EP titled Chalice Row or Dig a Hole which debuted on Billboard's Reggae Album Charts at Number 1. This EP was produced by Giddimani Records, founded in late 2009 by Rose, in collaboration with Chalice Row Unlimited based in California.

On 7 July 2017, Perfect Giddimani released his 11th studio album titled Live My Life Again. This fifteen track album released by Giddimani Records, debuted at number 1 on Billboard's Reggae Albums chart for the week of 2 September 2017. It spent 3 consecutive weeks on the charts going from 1 to 5 then up to 3 as the charts greatest gainer for the week of 16 September 2017. This album also entered the Billboard Independent albums chart peaking at 38.

== Awards and Accomplishments ==
=== Billboard Chart Appearances ===
Year	Artist	Title	Chart Category	Peak position	Role
2017	Perfect Giddimani	"Live My Life Again"	Billboard Reggae	No. 1	Artiste / Producer
2017	Perfect Giddimani	"Live My Life Again"	Billboard Independent Albums	No. 38	Artiste / Producer
2017	Young Shanty	"Chalice Row or Dig a Hole"	Billboard Reggae	No. 1	Producer

== Discography ==
=== Albums ===
Studio Albums
Title	Release date	Label	Format
Giddimani (European Version)	21 July 2006	DHF Records	CD, Digital distribution
Giddimani (US Version)	21 July 2006	DHF Records	CD, Digital Distribution
Born Dead With Life	25 July 2008	Irievibration Records	CD, Digital Distribution
French Connection	27 November 2009	Irievibrations, Tiger Records (9)	CD, Digital Distribution
Karma	2009	Chalice Palace Music	CD, Digital Distribution
Back for the First Time	19 July 2011	Lustre Kings	CD, Digital Distribution
Journey of 1000 Miles	22 May 2012	Dynasty Records (8)	CD, Digital Distribution
Over The Top	10 September 2013	House of Riddim Records	CD, Digital Distribution
Better Off Dread	15 April 2014	Giddimani Records	CD, Digital Distribution
Reggae Farm Work	4 March 2016	Irie Ites	CD, Digital Distribution
Live My Life Again	7 July 2017	Giddimani Records	CD, Digital Distribution

=== Singles ===
Singles
Title	Label	Release year	Format
”Burn Down Babylon"	Builders	2000	7-inch Vinyl
”The Song of the Rastaman"	One Love	2003	7-Inch Vinyl
”She Wants Rasta"	Commissioner	2004	7-Inch Vinyl
”Talk Black Marcus"	Down Sound Records	2004	7-Inch Vinyl
”Rainbow"	Loyal Soldiers Production	2004	7-Inch Vinyl
”Hand Cart Bwoy"	Rebel Muzic	2004	7-Inch Vinyl
”All Fi Dem Self"	Chalice Palace Music	2004	7-Inch Vinyl
”Bush Baby"	Loyal Soldiers Production	2005	7-Inch Vinyl
”Word, Power and Sound"	Grillaras	2005	7-Inch Vinyl
”Till The Soul"	Ball A Fire Muzik	2005	7-Inch Vinyl
”Hit Dem"	Chalice Palace Music & Tiger Records	2005	7-Inch Vinyl
”Lion Awake"	Free Willy	2005	7-Inch Vinyl
”For My Family"	Delperies Records	2005	7-Inch Vinyl
”Nah Vote"	Arrows Records	2005	7-Inch Vinyl
”My Herbs"	Stone Love	2005	7-Inch Vinyl
”For Sure"	Down Sound Records	2005	7-Inch Vinyl
”Dirty Shame"	Purple Skunk Records	2005	7-Inch Vinyl
”Johnny Trim"	Our Promotion	2005	7-Inch Vinyl
”Economical Crises"	Dream Entertainment	2005	7-Inch Vinyl
”Shoulda Neva"	No Doubt Records	2005	7-Inch Vinyl
”Take Me Home"	Irievibrations Records	2005	7-Inch Vinyl
”Mama"	Voice Stream Productions	2006	7-Inch Vinyl
”Free Up"	Down Sound Records	2006	7-Inch Vinyl
”Nah Vote (Remastered)"	Arrows Records	2006	7-Inch Vinyl
”Born & Raise (Perfect & Singing Flasher)"	Yellow Moon Records(2)	2006	7-Inch Vinyl
”When I’m Talking"	Tiger Records	2006	7-Inch Vinyl
”My Words"	Mista Wilks	2006	7-Inch Vinyl
”Love Bird"	Irievibrations Records	2006	7-Inch Vinyl
”Few #2"	Time Travel Productions	2006	7-Inch Vinyl
”Just For Love Sake"	Tiger Records	2006	7-Inch Vinyl
”Love Is What You Need"	Special Delivery Music	2006	7-Inch Vinyl
”Sweet and Black"	Camp Fire Productions	2006	7-Inch Vinyl
”Mama Earth"	Palm of Gold	2006	7-Inch Vinyl
”Nuh Badda Me"	Pure and Clean	2006	7-Inch Vinyl
”Sinting"	Blaque Warriahz Muzik	2006	7-Inch Vinyl
”Love You Girl"	Ice-Berg Records	2006	7-Inch Vinyl
”Jamaica is Paradise"	GT Muzik	2007	7-Inch Vinyl
”Good To Smoke"	Blenders Finest	2007	7-Inch Vinyl
”30 Pieces"	Irievibration Records	2007	7-Inch Vinyl
”Light This Joint"	Irie Ites Records	2007	7-Inch Vinyl
”One Life"	Irie Ites Records	2007	7-Inch Vinyl
”Journey(Perfect & Chezidek)"	Irievibrations Records	2008	7-Inch Vinyl
”Pretty Butterfly"	Stainless Records	2008	7-Inch Vinyl
”Unlock"	Irievibrations Records	2008	7-Inch Vinyl
”Life in Living"	Kings of Kings	2008	7-Inch Vinyl
”Revolution"	Lionart Records	2008	7-Inch Vinyl
”Irie Ites"	Irie Ites Records	2008	7-Inch Vinyl
”No Sorry"	Born Fire Music	2008	7-Inch Vinyl
”Lively Up (Anthony B & Perfect)"	Irievibrations Records	2008	7-Inch Vinyl
”Can’t Touch Me"	African Beat Records	2009	7-Inch Vinyl
”10 Pounds of Ganja"	African Beat Records	2009	7-Inch Vinyl
”Pass it Over"	Weedy G Soundforce	2009	7-Inch Vinyl
”Can’t Get Over This"	Young Veterans	2009	7-Inch Vinyl
”I Smoke A Spliff"	Blenders Finest	2009	7-Inch Vinyl
”Money Can’t Buy Love"	Weedy G Soundforce	2010	7-Inch Vinyl
”Bawl"	Supersonic Sound	2010	7-Inch Vinyl
”Reggae Music"	African Beat Records	2010	7-Inch Vinyl
”Everyone"	In The Streets Records	2011	7-Inch Vinyl
”Cyaan Lock We Off"	Sound Quake	2011	7-Inch Vinyl
”Aba Simba"	80100	2012	7-Inch Vinyl
”Be Hopeful"	Boom Shak Records	2012	7-Inch Vinyl
”Bomboclaat "	Irie Ites Records	2012	7-Inch Vinyl
”Good Personality"	Red Strike Records	2012	7-Inch Vinyl
”Country Cousin "	House of Riddim	2012	Digital Distribution
”T.G.I.F. "	Fireman Crew	2012	Digital Distribution
”Born To Rule"	Skyman Productions	2012	Digital Distribution
”Only Haile Alone "	Oneness Records/Family Music	2012	Digital Distribution
”Roots For Me "	Dynasty Records/VP Records	2012	Digital Distribution
”Herbs For Me"	Greezzly Productions	2012	Digital Distribution
”Champions Anthem"	Superfly Studio	2013	7-Inch Vinyl
”Cyaan Cool"	Ragga Meridional Crew	2013	Digital Distribution
”Bet You've Never Seen This "	KaceOne Entertainment	2013	Digital Distribution
”Save A Little Bit "	Batelier Records/Flavour Production	2013	Digital Distribution
”Weed Is Better Than Liquor"	Lustre Kings Productions	2013	Digital Distribution
”Big Vibez Forward "	Weedy G Soundforce/VPAL Music	2013	Digital Distribution
”Love in My Soul "	Soul Chordz Productions	2013	Digital Distribution
”Laugh"	Undisputed Records/Brimstone	2013	Digital Distribution
”Middle Finger"	Skyman Selecta Productions	2013	Digital Distribution
”Road To Zion "	WeedyG SOundforce/VPAL Music	2013	Digital Distribution
”Dogs and Pussies"	Weedy G Soundforce/VPAL Music	2013	Digital Distribution
”Rockstone Highway"	Giddimani Music	2013	Digital Distribution
”Straight To Mi heart"	Irie Ites Records	2014	7-Inch Vinyl, Digital Distribution
”Smoke Alarm"	Royal Orders Music	2014	7-Inch Vinyl
”Party"	Niyahfyah Records	2014	Digital Distribution
”Party (Electro house Remix) "	Niyahfyah Records	2014	Digital Distribution
”Oh Johnny"	Trainline Records	2014	Digital Distribution
”A Reason "	Jugglerz Records	2014	Digital Distribution
”Hail The King"	May.b Unity	2014	Digital Distribution
”Bad Boy"	House of Riddim	2014	Digital Distribution
”Mama Africa"	HOR/Kathmandu Productions	2014	Digital Distribution
”Dance To This"	Jugglerz Records	2014	Digital Distribution
”No More Crying"	International Highpower Records	2014	Digital Distribution
”Giddimani Again"	Struttingbeats Records	2014	Digital Distribution
”Alien"	Wadadda Muzik	2014	Digital Distribution
”Kutchie Cup"	Wadadda Muzik Ltd.	2014	Digital Distribution
”The System (feat. Pampi Judah)"	Papa Noah Productions	2014	Digital Distribution
”Where It All Began"	Weedy G Soundforce/VPAL Music	2014	Digital Distribution
”Just An Ounce Ounce"	West Coast Studios	2014	Digital Distribution
”Bombaclat"	Bikini Ape	2014	Digital Distribution
”At Di Controls"	Superfly Studio	2014	Digital Distribution
”The People We Are"	Lustre Kings Productions	2014	Digital Distribution
”Don't Be Afraid"	Green Lion Crew	2014	Digital Distribution
”Wet Dem Up"	Fireside Entertainment	2014	Digital Distribution
”Golden Touch"	Pete Music	unknown	7-Inch Vinyl
”So Much"	Taxi	unknown	7-Inch Vinyl
”She Wants Rasta"	Commissioner	unknown	7-Inch Vinyl
”Like To Get You Wet"	Down Sound Records	unknown	7-Inch Vinyl
”Grow Yuh Natty"	Frenz	unknown	7-Inch Vinyl
”Golden Touch"	Vikings Production	unknown	7-Inch Vinyl
”Haile Selassie"	Lion Vibes Sound and Music	unknown	7-Inch Vinyl
”Lock Mi Up"	Intouch Music	unknown	7-Inch Vinyl
”Corner Stone"	MX Productions	unknown	7-Inch Vinyl
”Bobo Nuh Shave"	Star Track Music	unknown	7-Inch Vinyl
”Amerimaka"	Chalice Palace Music	unknown	7-Inch Vinyl
”Do Good"	Studio 55	unknown	7-Inch Vinyl
”Nothing Matter Me"	Soundbank Music	unknown	7-Inch Vinyl
”All I’ve Got"	Yellow Moon Records(2)	unknown	7-Inch Vinyl
”Them A Move Like Nookie"	Heart of Love	unknown	7-Inch Vinyl
”Life Is The Greatest"	Ice-Berg Records	unknown	7-Inch Vinyl
”Junju Claat"	Jam II Records	unknown	7-Inch Vinyl
”Eighty Gangsters"	Addis Records	unknown	7-Inch Vinyl
”R over X Way"	Free Willy	unknown	7-Inch Vinyl
”Thats The Way"	Free Willy	unknown	7-Inch Vinyl
”Ganja Spliff"	Tads International	unknown	7-Inch Vinyl
”Slave Master"	Togetherness Records	unknown	7-Inch Vinyl
”Time Getting Red"	New York Entertainment Movement	unknown	7-Inch Vinyl
”Gone with the Wind"	Studio 55	unknown	7-Inch Vinyl
”High Grade Tree"	Rebel Muzic	unknown	7-Inch Vinyl
”Them Bad Mind"	Kickin Productions	unknown	7-Inch Vinyl
”Mark of the Beast"	Kickin Productions	unknown	7-Inch Vinyl
”Found True Love"	Voice Stream Productions	unknown	7-Inch Vinyl
”Bed Room Fan"	Intouch Music	unknown	7-Inch Vinyl
”Cruising"	The Worthington Project	unknown	7-Inch Vinyl
”World Trade Center"	Ice-Berg Records	unknown	7-Inch Vinyl
”New Day"	Studio 55	unknown	7-Inch Vinyl

=== Mixtapes ===
- 2008: 30 Pieces
- 2009: Dear Mr. President
- 2009: The Perfect Mixtape
- 2011: Giddimani Nah Drop
