= Perfection Pass =

Mountain pass in Nunavut, Canada

- Location within Nunavut

Third Approach
- Location: Nunavut, Canada
- Coordinates: 69°49′03″N 69°07′49″W
- Topo map: NTS 27C15 (untitled)

Perfection Pass is a mountain pass in the central Baffin Mountains, Nunavut, Canada.
