= Cicho =

Studio album by Ewa Farna
- Released: 16 March 2009
- Recorded: 2009
- Genre: Rock-pop
- Label: Universal Music Group

Ewa Farna chronology
Sam na sam (2007)	Cicho (2009)	Virtuální (2009)

Singles from Cicho
- 1. "Cicho" Released: 2009; 2. "Dmuchawce, latawce, wiatr" Released: 2009; 3. "La la laj" Released: February 2010

Cicho is the second Polish language and fourth overall studio album by the pop rock singer Ewa Farna, released on 16 March 2009. It is a Polish version of her album Ticho, which has originally Czech lyrics and charted at #2 on the Czech album chart.

The last song is a cover of Polish singer Urszula's song "Dmuchawce, latawce, wiatr" (music by Romuald Lipko, lyrics by Marek Dutkiewicz). The album reached 16th place on the OLiS chart in Poland.

In February 2010, the album was nominated for the Polish phonographic industry award "Fryderyk" in the category "Pop Album of the Year", while the artist was nominated in the category "New Face of Phonography". On October 13, the album Cicho achieved platinum status in Poland, and then - twice platinum.

== Track list ==
No.	Title	Lyrics	Music	Length
1.	"Cicho" (Fractions)	Marek Dutkiewicz	Kirsten Eg Bruun, Fabian Petersen, Mats Lundgren, Max Lachmann	3:26
2.	"La la laj"	Ewa Farna, Honza Ponocný, Dutkiewicz (Polish)	Honza Ponocný	3:22
3.	"S.O.S! Pomocy!"	Tomáš Choura, Mirosława Szawińska (Polish)	Lešek Wronka	3:55
4.	"Ogień we mnie" (Ponorka)	Farna, Ponocný, Justyna Holm (Polish)	Ponocný	2:19
5.	"Poznasz mnie, bo to ja" (I'm In Love)	Holm	Ari Lehtonen, Herbie Crichlow, Charlie King	3:44
6.	"Nie będziesz sam" (Colour Me Free)	Holm	Bruun, Jarle Kolstad, Per Stappe	3:16
7.	"W niespełnieniu" (Tenkrát)	Petr Šiška, Holm (Polish)	Wronka	4:04
8.	"Już dorośnij!" (Z bláta do louže)	Petra Glosr Cvrkalová, Holm (Polish)	Marcus Tran	3:18
9.	"Kto to jest?" (Wonderful)	Holm	Louise Fält, Farhad Zand, Dimitri Stassos	3:13
10.	"Dokąd nas niesie" (Něco nám přejte)	Jana Rolincová, Szawińska (Polish)	Wronka	3:50
11.	"Śmiej się!" (Směj se)	Farna, Cvrkalová, Szawińska (Polish)	Wronka	3:27
12.	"Dmuchawce, latawce, wiatr"	Dutkiewicz	Romuald Lipko	4:01
