= Umami (Ewa Farna album) =

Studio album by Ewa Farna
- Released: 10 December 2021 (Czech-language); 28 January 2022 (Polish-language)
- Genre: Pop
- Length: 36:30
- Languages: Czech; Polish
- Label: EwoluZone

Ewa Farna chronology
Singles & Specials (2020)	Umami (2021)	ADHD POP (2026)

Umami is the fifth studio album by the Polish-Czech singer Ewa Farna. The Czech version of the album was released on 10 December 2021, while the Polish version of the album was released one month later on 28 January 2022, both through Farna's own label EwoluZone.

Farna collaborated with several producers on the album, including Jan Vávra and Mikołaj Trybulec. The song "Reinkarnační" features a guest appearance by singer Sofian Medjmedj. The album's title comes from Japanese, where the word umami refers to the fifth taste that enhances all other tastes.

== Track list ==
=== Umami (CZ) ===
Umami track listing
No.	Title	Length
1.	"Umami"	1:22
2.	"No ne"	2:33
3.	"Zkraceno v překladu"	2:27
4.	"Tělo"	3:40
5.	"Vařím z vody"	3:01
6.	"Klid"	3:56
7.	"Reinkarnační" (feat. Sofian Medjmedj)	2:56
8.	"Verze 02"	3:41
9.	"Sama doma"	2:56
10.	"Ross & Rachel"	2:47
11.	"Smutná píseň"	3:03
12.	"Umamy (Kořeny a křídla)"	4:04

=== Umami (PL) ===
Umami track listing
No.	Title	Length
1.	"Umami"	1:22
2.	"No nie"	2:33
3.	"Na skróty"	2:27
4.	"Ciało"	3:40
5.	"Mała czarna"	3:01
6.	"Luz"	3:56
7.	"2min" (feat. Sofian Medjmedj)	2:56
8.	"Wersja 2.0"	3:41
9.	"Szalona"	2:56
10.	"Ross i Rachel"	2:47
11.	"Smutna piosenka" (feat. Krzysztof Zalewski)	3:03
12.	"Umamy (Korzenie i skrzydła)"	4:04

== Charts ==
Chart performance for Umami (CZ)
Chart (2021)	Peak position
Czech Albums (ČNS IFPI)	9
