= Perfect Creek =

Stream in Ohio, U.S.

Coordinates: 40°15′25″N 82°50′34″W

Perfect Creek is a stream in the U.S. state of Ohio.

Perfect Creek was named for William Perfect, a pioneer who settled near it in 1807.

== See also ==
- List of rivers of Ohio
