= Imperfect group =

In mathematics, in the area of algebra known as group theory, an imperfect group is a group with no nontrivial perfect quotients. Some of their basic properties were established in (Berrick & Robinson 1993). The study of imperfect groups apparently began in (Robinson 1972).

The class of imperfect groups is closed under extension and quotient groups, but not under subgroups. If G is a group, N, M are normal subgroups with G/N and G/M imperfect, then G/(N∩M) is imperfect, showing that the class of imperfect groups is a formation. The (restricted or unrestricted) direct product of imperfect groups is imperfect.

Every solvable group is imperfect. Finite symmetric groups are also imperfect. The general linear groups PGL(2,q) are imperfect for q an odd prime power. For any group H, the wreath product H wr Sym_{2} of H with the symmetric group on two points is imperfect. In particular, every group can be embedded as a two-step subnormal subgroup of an imperfect group of roughly the same cardinality (2|H|^{2}).
