= Naya Anindita =

Indonesian filmmaker (born 1988)

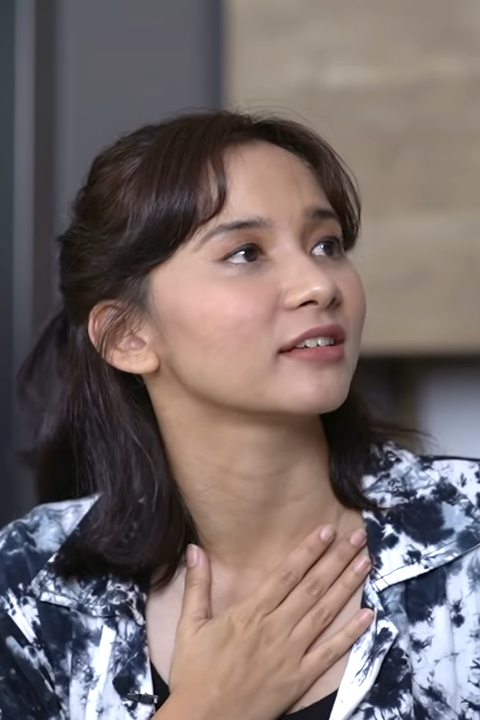
- Anindita in 2021
- Born: 9 November 1988 (age 37); Bandung, West Java, Indonesia
- Occupations: Film director; screenwriter; actress
- Years active: 2010–present

Naya Anindita (born 9 November 1988) is an Indonesian film director, screenwriter, and actress. She rose to prominence for her travelling web series Jalan-Jalan Men! from 2012 to 2019. As a director, she made her directorial debut, biographical drama film Sundul Gan: The Story of Kaskus in 2016.

== Early life ==
Naya Anindita was born on 9 November 1988 in Bandung, West Java, Indonesia. She graduated from Limkokwing University of Creative Technology with a major in Mass Communication. A year later, she attended Curtin University, where she majored in film, television, and advertising. During her studies, she interned as a production assistant at Channel V. After graduating, she worked as an assistant art director at Dentsu.

== Career ==
In 2011, Anindita started her career in the film industry as an assistant director and make-up artist in drama film Euphoria. She then served as a co-host in travel web series Jalan Jalan Men from 2012 to 2019. In 2013, she directed her first short film Anna & Ballerina, following the life of a professional ballet dancer. She was nominated for Iqbal Rais Award for Best Young Director for a Short Film at the 2014 Maya Awards.

In 2016, Anindita made her directorial debut, biographical drama film Sundul Gan: The Story of Kaskus. She directed a road movie Berangkat! a year later, starring Tarra Budiman, Ayushita, Ringgo Agus Rahman, and Tanta Ginting. In 2019, she directed and co-wrote Eggnoid: Love & Time Portal, a film adaptation of a Webtoon of the same name. A year later, she was appointed by director Ernest Prakasa to direct the web series Imperfect the Series, a spinoff of the comedy film Imperfect (2019).

In 2025, she directed a romantic drama film Komang, starring Aurora Ribero and Kiesha Alvaro. It was released during the Eid al-Fitr weekend and garnered a total of 3,002,303 admissions during its theatrical run. She won the Highly Commended Director at the 38th Festival Film Bandung. She directed comedy drama film Tunggu Aku Sukses Nanti in 2026, starring Ardit Erwandha. It marks her second film to release during the Eid al-Fitr weekend. It garnered a million admissions during its first eight days of release.

== Filmography ==
=== Film ===
Year	Title	Director	Writer	Notes
2011	Euphoria	No	No	As an assistant director and make-up artist
2012	Sinema Purnama	No	No	As a co-producer
2013	Anna & Ballerina	Yes	Yes	Short
2016	Sundul Gan: The Story of Kaskus	Yes	No	
2017	Berangkat!	Yes	No	
2019	Eggnoid: Love & Time Portal	Yes	Yes	
2025	Komang	Yes	No	
2026	Tunggu Aku Sukses Nanti	Yes	Yes	

=== Television ===
Year	Title	Director	Writer	Network	Notes
2012–2019	Jalan Jalan Men!	No	No	YouTube	As co-host
2021–2023	Imperfect the Series	Yes	No	WeTV	
2023	Kalau Jodoh Takkan ke Mana	Yes	No	YouTube	Season 2
