= Perfectionism (philosophy) =

Philosophical concept

In ethics and value theory, perfectionism is the persistence of will in obtaining the optimal quality of spiritual, mental, physical, and material being. Thomas Hurka describes perfectionism as follows:

This moral theory starts from an account of the good life, or the intrinsically desirable life. And it characterizes this life in a distinctive way. Certain properties, it says, constitute human nature or are definitive of humanity—they make humans human. The good life, it then says, develops these properties to a high degree or realizes what is central to human nature. Different versions of the theory may disagree about what the relevant properties are and so disagree about the content of the good life. But they share the foundational idea that what is good, ultimately, is the development of human nature.

== History ==
Perfectionism, as a moral theory, has a long history and has been addressed by influential philosophers. Aristotle stated his conception of the good life (eudaimonia). He taught that politics and political structures should promote the good life among individuals; because the polis can best promote the good life, it should be adopted over other forms of social organization.

The philosopher Stanley Cavell develops the concept of moral perfectionism as the idea that there is an unattained but attainable self that one ought to strive to reach. Moral perfectionists believe that the ancient questions such as "Am I living as I am supposed to?" make all the difference in the world and they describe the commitment we ought to have in ways that seem, but are not, impossibly demanding. We do so because it is only in the keeping such an "impossible" view in mind that one can strive for one's "unattained but attainable self."

In his book Cities of Words: Pedagogical Letters on a Register of the Moral Life (2005), based on a lecture course called "Moral Perfectionism" that he first gave at Harvard University in the 1980s, Stanley Cavell characterizes moral perfectionism in general, and what he calls "Emersonian perfectionism," the form of moral perfectionism he embraces and defends, not as a theory of moral philosophy comparable to Immanuel Kant's deontological view that there is a universal moral law (the categorical imperative) by which we can rationally determine whether an action is right or wrong, or John Stuart Mill's utilitarian view that the good action is that which will cause the least harm, or the greatest good for the greatest number. For Cavell, moral perfectionism is an outlook or register of thought, a way of thinking about morality expressed thematically in certain works of philosophy, literature and film. As William Rothman summarizes the idea, Cavell "takes it to be our primary task as human beings—at once our deepest wish, whether or not we know this about ourselves, and our moral obligation—to become more fully human, to realize our humanity in our lives in the world, which always requires the simultaneous acknowledgment of the humanity of others (our acknowledgment of them, and theirs of us)." Cities of Words pairs chapters on major philosophers in the Western tradition, such as Plato, Aristotle, Immanuel Kant, Ralph Waldo Emerson, Friedrich Nietzsche, John Stuart Mill, Sigmund Freud and John Rawls, endorsing Cavell's understanding of moral perfectionism and such artists as William Shakespeare, Henry James, Henrik Ibsen and George Bernard Shaw, with chapters on a film, all but one (A Tale of Winter (1992) by Eric Rohmer) a member of the classical Hollywood genres; what he called "the comedy of remarriage" and "the melodrama of the unknown woman". Cavell's argument is that these films are illustrative of moral perfectionism (and, more specifically, Emersonian perfectionism).The moral questions couples in remarriage comedies like It Happened One Night, The Awful Truth and The Philadelphia Story address in their witty give- and-take, for example, are, as Cavell puts it, "formulated less well by questions concerning what they ought to do, what it would be best or right for them to do, than by the question how they shall live their lives, what kind of persons they aspire to be."^{7}

== Happiness ==
Perfection means more than—or something different from—happiness or pleasure, and perfectionism is distinct from utilitarianism in all its forms. A society devoted to perfectionist principles may not produce happy citizens—far from it. Kant regarded such a society as government paternalism, which he denied for the sake of a "patriotic" state (imperium non paternale, sed patrioticum). While the individual is responsible for living a virtuous life, the state should be limited to the regulation of human coexistence.

Alfred Naquet was of the view that there are no universal parameters of perfection. Individuals and cultures choose those values that, for them, represent the ideal of perfection. For example, one individual may view education as leading perfection, while to another beauty is the highest ideal.

He wrote in this regard:

The true role of collective existence ... is to learn, to discover, to know. Eating, drinking, sleeping, living, in a word, is a mere accessory. In this respect, we are not distinguished from the brute. Knowledge is the goal. If I were condemned to choose between a humanity materially happy, glutted after the manner of a flock of sheep in a field, and a humanity existing in misery, but from which emanated, here and there, some eternal truth, it is on the latter my choice would fall.

From a critical perspective, similar sentiments were expressed by Matthew Arnold in his Culture and Anarchy essays. According to the view he advanced in the 1869 publication, "Culture [...] is a study of perfection". He further wrote that: "[Culture] seeks to do away with classes; to make the best that has been thought and known in the world current everywhere; to make all men live in an atmosphere of sweetness and light [...]".

Moreover, in the preface of that text, he wrote:

The whole scope of the essay is to recommend culture as the great help out of our present difficulties; culture being a pursuit of our total perfection by means of getting to know, on all the matters which most concern us, the best which has been thought and said in the world, and, through this knowledge, turning a stream of fresh and free thought upon our stock notions and habits, which we now follow staunchly but mechanically, vainly imagining that there is a virtue in following them staunchly which makes up for the mischief of following them mechanically.

== See also ==
- Christian perfection
- Perfection
- Perfectionism
- Rationalism
- Utilitarianism
