= An Imperfection =

- Official poster
- Directed by: Rasanga Weerasinghe
- Written by: Rasanga Weerasinghe
- Produced by: Rasanga Weerasinghe; Rama Jabri; Jon Suk; Eranga Hemajith
- Starring: Erin Keller; Jaylee Hamidi; Michael Ian Farrell
- Cinematography: Alex Newton
- Edited by: Amila Akalpa Perera; Rasanga Weerasinghe
- Music by: Jonathan George; Sean Sansoni
- Release dates: 2 September 2015 (Film Forum Goethe Institut); 29 September 2015
- Running time: 88 minutes
- Countries: Canada; Sri Lanka
- Language: English

An Imperfection is a 2015 Sri Lankan Canadian drama, thriller film directed by Rasanga Weerasinghe and co-produced by Rasanga Weerasinghe, Eranga Hemajith, Rama Jabri, and Jon Suk. It stars Erin Keller, Jaylee Hamidi, and Michael Ian Farrell. Music co-composed by Jonathan George and Sean Sansoni.

== Plot ==
A young woman begins dating after a life-changing journey and she instantly connects with a man. Their bliss is cut short when the couple are attacked by a vicious gang, and their imperfections are revealed.

== Cast ==
- Erin Keller as Kamara
- Jaylee Hamidi as Becky
- Michael Ian Farrell as Irish Thug
- Sean Behnsen as Naughty
- Christoph Koniczek as Skinner
- Peter John Berry as Bad
- Chris Mackie as Irish Thug
- Nick Thorp as Vincent

== Production ==
The film was produced with a shoe string budget of C$ 3,000 and shot over six days in Victoria, British Columbia. It was partially improvised: the script was only 55 pages. The filmmakers were inspired by the Guerrilla filmmaking approaches of filmmakers such as Thomas Vinterberg, Gareth Edwards, Joe Swanberg, and John Cassavetes.

== Accolades and screenings ==
An Imperfection was premiered at Goethe-Institut Film Forum (Colombo) in 2015 and the event was moderated by the veteran filmmaker Anomaa Raajakaruna, Boodee Keerthisena and Author Kaushalya Kumarasinghe. Subsequently, it was also premiered in Canada at the Victoria Event Centre (British Columbia) in 2015 with a panel discussion with the cast and the director. An Imperfection was nominated for Best debut film at the Jaffna International Film Festival in 2016. It was also nominated for Best Film on Human Rights category at the International Open Film Festival (IOFF) in 2016. It was later screened at the Fandependent Film Festival.
