= Perfect =

Perfect commonly refers to:

- Perfection; completeness, and excellence
- Perfect (grammar), a grammatical category in some languages

Perfect may also refer to:

== Film and television ==
- Perfect (1985 film), a romantic drama
- Perfect (2018 film), a science fiction thriller
- Perfect (2026 film), an American drama
- "Perfect" (Doctors), a 2004 television episode

== Literature ==
- Perfect (Friend novel), a 2004 novel by Natasha Friend
- Perfect (Hopkins novel), a young adult novel by Ellen Hopkins
- Perfect (Joyce novel), a 2013 novel by Rachel Joyce
- Perfect (Shepard novel), a Pretty Little Liars novel by Sara Shepard
- Perfect, a young adult science fiction novel by Dyan Sheldon

== Music ==
- Perfect interval, in music theory
- Perfect Records, a record label

=== Artists ===
- Perfect (musician) (born 1980), reggae singer
- Perfect (Polish band)
- Perfect (American band), an American alternative rock group

=== Albums ===
- Perfect (Intwine album) (2004)
- Perfect (Half Japanese album) (2016)
- perfecT, an album by Sam Shaber
- Perfect, an album by True Faith or its title track
- Perfect, an album by Benny Hester or its title track

=== EPs ===
- Perfect (Mannequin Pussy EP) (2021)

=== Songs ===
- "Perfect" (Vanessa Amorosi song) (2008)
- "Perfect" (Anne-Marie song) (2018)
- "Perfect" (Carl Brave song) (2025)
- "Perfect" (Rob Cantor song) (2014)
- "Perfect" (Darin song) (2006)
- "Perfect" (Disney song), a song from Disenchanted (2022)
- "Perfect" (Sara Evans song) (2003)
- "Perfect" (Fairground Attraction song) (1988)
- "Perfect" (Hedley song) (2010)
- "Perfect" (One Direction song) (2015)
- "Perfect" (PJ & Duncan song) (1995)
- "Perfect" (Princess Superstar song) (2005)

- "Perfect (Exceeder)", a 2007 mash-up of "Perfect" by Princess Superstar and "Exceeder" Mason

- "Perfect" (Psychic Fever song) (2024)
- "Perfect" (Ed Sheeran song) (2017)
- "Perfect" (Simple Plan song) (2003)
- "Perfect" (The Smashing Pumpkins song) (1998)
- "Perfect" (Topic and Ally Brooke song) (2018)
- "Perfect", the clean version of "Fuckin' Perfect" by Pink (2010)
- "Perfect", a song by Alexandra Burke from Overcome
- "Perfect", a song by John Cale from blackAcetate
- "Perfect", a song by Depeche Mode from Sounds of the Universe
- "Perfect", a song by Flyleaf from Flyleaf
- "Perfect", a song by Selena Gomez from Revival
- "Perfect", a song by the Lightning Seeds from Jollification
- "Perfect", a song by Lights from Songs from Instant Star Four
- "Perfect", a song by Marianas Trench from Masterpiece Theatre
- "Perfect", a song by Christina Milian from Christina Milian
- "Perfect", a song by Alanis Morissette from Jagged Little Pill
- "Perfect", a song by Julia Murney from I'm Not Waiting
- "Perfect", a song by Freya Ridings from Blood Orange
- "Perfect", a song by Stabbing Westward from Stabbing Westward
- "Perfect", a song by The The
- "Perfect", a song by Steve Aoki featuring PnB Rock and 24hrs from Hiroquest 2: Double Helix
- "Perfect", a song by Icewear Vezzo featuring DaBaby from Live From The 6
- "The Perfect", a song by the Killing Tree from The Romance of Helen Trent

== Mathematics ==
- Perfect graph
- Perfect group
- Perfect lattice (same as perfect form)
- Perfect matrix
- Perfect number
- Perfect power
- Perfect set

== People with the surname ==
- Chip Perfect, American businessman and politician
- Christine McVie née Perfect (1943–2022), English musician
- Eddie Perfect (born 1977), Australian musician, comedian, writer and actor
- Hazel Perfect (died 2015), British mathematician

== Other uses ==
- Perfect (server framework), for the Swift programming language
- Perfect Developer, a tool for developing computer programs
- Cathar Perfect, a Cathar priest
- Perfect Creek, Ohio, United States
- Perfect, a cocktail containing equal measures of sweet and dry vermouth
- Perfect flower, one having both male and female reproductive structures
- Perfect, the former name of Japanese racehorse Tokino Minoru

== See also ==
- Perfekt (disambiguation)
