= High Times – The Best of Fools Garden =

High Times The Best of Fools Garden

Greatest hits album by Fools Garden
- Released: 2 October 2009
- Genre: Rock; indie pop; pop rock
- Label: Ladybird Music; BMG Rights Management

Fools Garden chronology
Home (2008)	High Times; The Best of Fools Garden (2009)	Who Is Jo King? (2012)

Singles from High Times – The Best of Fools Garden
- 1. "High Time" Released: 2009

High Times – The Best of Fools Garden is a best-of compilation album by German pop band Fools Garden, released on 2 October 2009 on Fools Garden's own label Ladybird Music and BMG Rights Management.

== Overview ==
The album features 11 tracks taken from the band's back catalogue, 3 newly rerecorded tracks ("Lemon Tree", "Wild Days" and "Suzy") plus one new recording, "High Time".

The compilation doesn't include any song from band's first two albums and omits eight of their later singles, such as "Pieces", "It Can Happen", "Happy", "In the Name", "Closer", "Man of Devotion", "Does Anybody Know?" and "Cold".

A limited edition of the album paired with the live album Best of Unplugged – Live was also released.

== Track listing ==
All songs written by Peter Freudenthaler and Volker Hinkel, except Track 9 by Freudenthaler, Hinkel and Gabriel Holz

1. "Lemon Tree"
2. "Wild Days"
  - Tracks 1–2: original version on the album Dish of the Day
3. "Probably"
4. "Why Did She Go?"
5. "Rainy Day"
  - Tracks 3–5: from the album Go and Ask Peggy for the Principal Thing
6. "Suzy"
  - Track 6: original version on the album For Sale
7. "Dreaming"
  - Track 7: from the album 25 Miles to Kissimmee
8. "Welcome Sun"
9. "Count on Me"
10. "Comedy Song
11. "Life"
  - Tracks 8–11 from the album Ready for the Real Life
12. "I Got a Ticket"
  - Track 12: non-album single
13. "Home"
14. "Million Dollar Baby"
  - Tracks 13–14: from the EP Home
15. "High Time"
  - Track 15: previously unreleased
