= Man of Devotion =

Single by Fools Garden

from the album Ready for the Real Life
- Released: May 2005
- Genre: Indie pop
- Label: Lemonade Music
- Songwriter(s): Volker Hinkel; Peter Freudenthaler
- Producer(s): Volker Hinkel; Fools Garden

Fools Garden singles chronology
"Dreaming (2004 version)" (2004)	"Man of Devotion" (2005)	"Does Anybody Know?" / "Welcome Sun" (2005)

"Man of Devotion" is the second single from the album Ready for the Real Life by German pop band Fools Garden.

Volkswagen used "Man of Devotion" in a commercial for Volkswagen Polo.

== Track listing ==
1. Man of Devotion (radio version)
2. Daihaminkay (call this world remix)
3. Man of Devotion (the rain house demotape)

Original version of "Daihaminkay" on the album Ready for the Real Life.

== Musicians ==
- Peter Freudenthaler – vocals
- Volker Hinkel – guitar
- Gabriel Holz – guitar
- Dirk Blümlein – bass
- Claus Müller – drums
