= Dish of the Day =

Dish of the Day may refer to:

- Dish of the Day (cow), served in the novel The Restaurant at the End of the Universe by Douglas Adams
- Dish of the Day (album), a studio album by the German pop group, Fools Garden
- "Dish of the Day" (Fresh Fields), a 1984 television episode
- plat du jour, the French expression
