= Volker Hinkel =

German rock musician

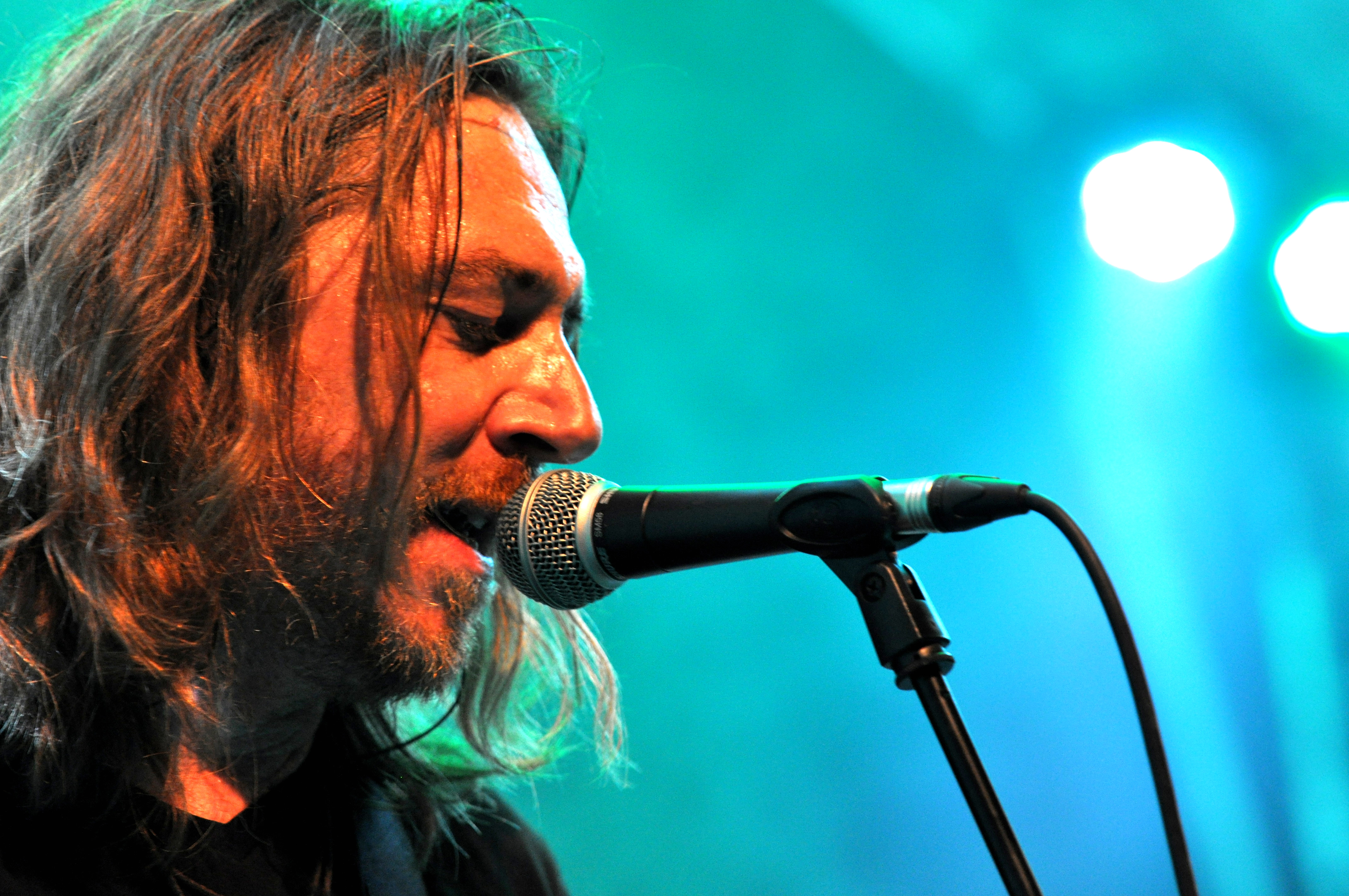
- Born: 21 June 1965 (age 61); Calw, Baden-Württemberg, West Germany
- Other name: The Laird of John O'Groats
- Occupations: Musician; songwriter; executive producer; sound engineer
- Musical career
- Genres: Britpop; pop rock; rock and roll; alternative rock; synth pop; electronic rock
- Instruments: Guitar; vocals; keyboards
- Years active: 1979–present
- Member of: Fool's Garden; Hinkel; M.I.N.E
- Formerly of: Central Heat; Passion; Magazine

Volker Hinkel (born 21 June 1965) is a German musician, composer and producer, best known as a founding member of the pop rock band Fool's Garden. Volker is a co-author of almost all the band's songs, and he is also actively involved in production and promotion of the band's releases (including the international hit "Lemon Tree" and the album Dish of the Day). As part of Fool's Garden, he plays guitar, performs vocals (on early albums) and backing vocals.

In addition to his participation in Fool's Garden, Volker Hinkel has his own solo project Hinkel and is also a member of the synth pop/electronic rock trio M.I.N.E. Volker Hinkel is also known for his occupation as audio engineer and executive producer, as well as composer of soundtracks for various films and series. He is the founder of the Hinkelstone Productions recording studio and co-founder of the Lemonade Music label.

== Biography ==
=== Beginnings of music career ===
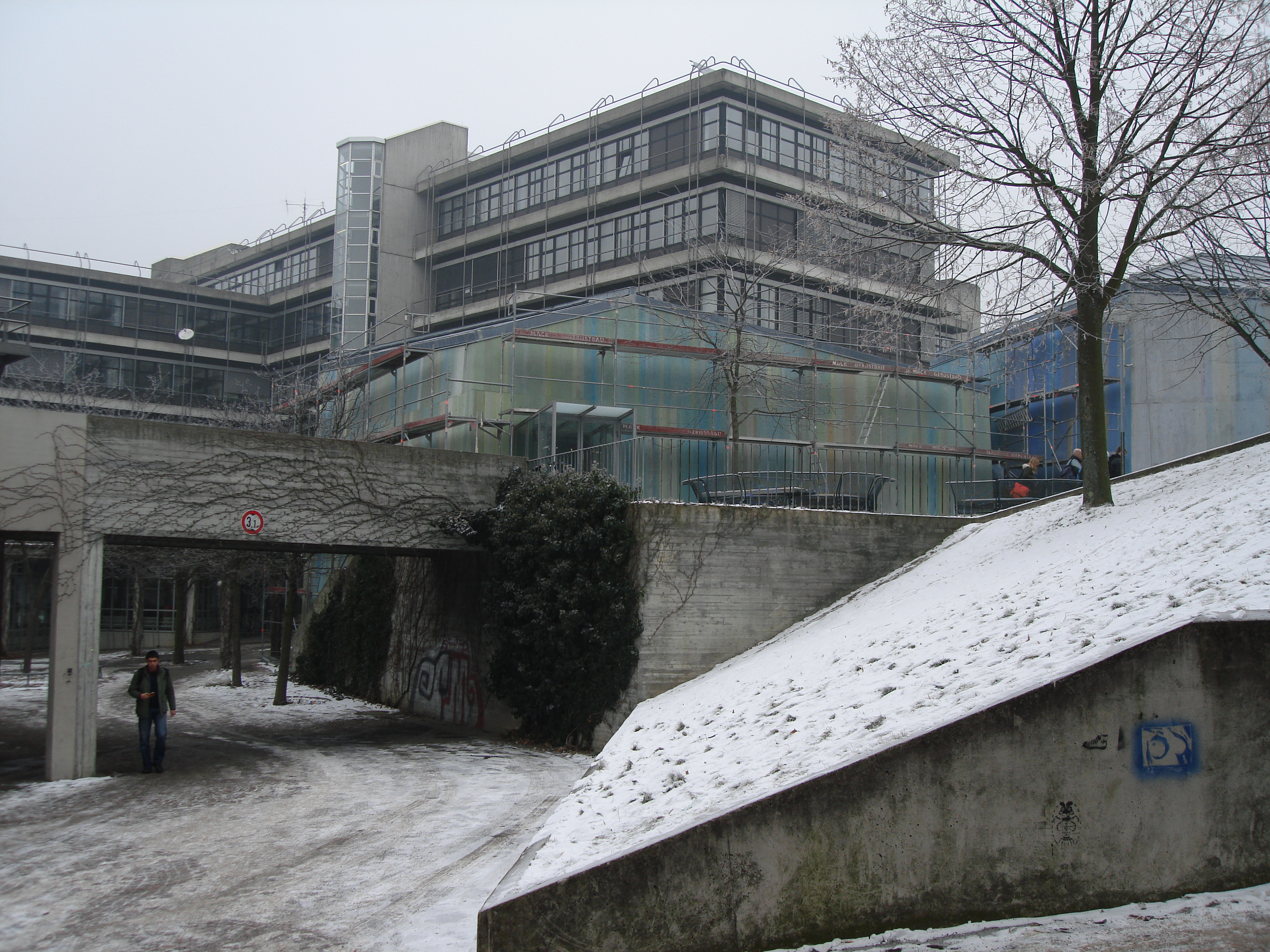
University of Stuttgart — the place where Volker Hinkel met Peter Freudenthaler

Volker Hinkel was born on 21 June 1965 in the small town of Calw in Baden-Württemberg. Since childhood, he studied piano and guitar and began performing music in 1979. His musical tastes were influenced by The Beatles and The Who. Volker's early bands were called Central Heat and Passion. In 1987, Hinkel, together with Claus-Dieter Wissler, founded the music project called Magazine.

In 1988, Volker took part in writing of the song "Building An Empire" by the German sophisti-pop duo Two of Us, which included Ulrich Herter and Thomas Dorr. The song was included in the album Inside Out, released the same year. Hinkel also played the piano during the recording of this song. Acquaintance with Herter played a role in the future: he helped Volker in promoting Fool's Garden releases, for instance, For Sale and "Suzy".

In 1991, Volker entered the University of Stuttgart to study multimedia technologies, where he met Peter Freudenthaler, who also had experience in playing in music groups. After listening to each other's demos and becoming sure their musical preferences matched, the musicians decided to combine their creative efforts, thus, Peter Freudenthaler joined the Magazine. Later, he would call his encounter with Volker "fateful". After some time, the musicians released an album Fool's Garden and, having liked this name, renamed Magazine to Fool's Garden.

=== Participation in Fool's Garden ===
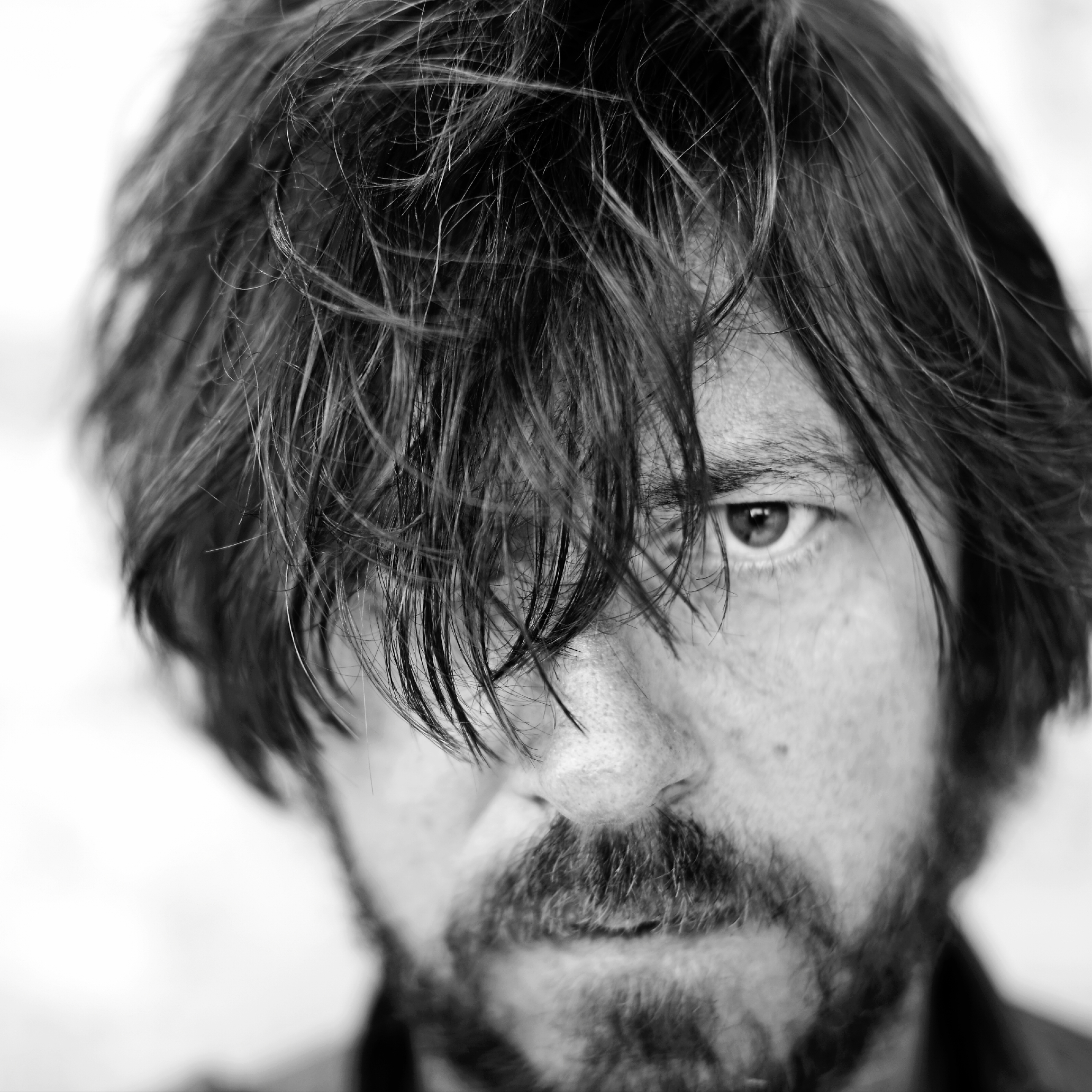
Hinkel in 2012

Since 1991, Volker Hinkel, along with Peter Freudenthaler, has been one of the two permanent members of Fool's Garden. Together with Freudenthaler, Hinkel is the author of the music and lyrics of all the songs recorded since the release of Once in a Blue Moon, which mainly included songs written by the musicians separately before they met each other. Also on the albums Fool's Garden and Once in a Blue Moon, many songs were sung by Hinkel, however, starting from Dish of the Day, Freudenthaler became the main vocalist of the group, while Hinkel (with the exception of the fully sung "Pure", "Martha My Dear", "Here in Your Arms", the live recording of "Finally", and the partially sung "Wild Days" and "Noone's Song") took over the backing vocals.

Fame to Volker Hinkel and the whole band came in 1995 with the release of the album Dish of the Day and the single "Lemon Tree" in particular. Both the album and the single topped many charts around the world, were sold in huge numbers and received certifications in several countries. According to Volker, it "was the right sound at the right time". However, as Hinkel mentioned, success came to the group very quickly, for which the musicians were not quite ready: they had to conduct frequent and long tours, give many interviews and participate in music shows.

=== Solo project Hinkel ===
In 1993, the musician began his solo work. The debut album In The Wake Of Thunder, which also featured bassist Thomas Mangold and drummer Ralph Vochele of Fool's Garden, was released in 1994 and later reissued in 1996 by Intercord. Some songs from Volker's debut album were also played at the band's concerts.

In 2001, Hinkel began work on a second solo album, which began recording in 2002 with bassist Dirk Blumlein and drummer Claus Müller. They subsequently joined Fool's Garden in 2003 when, following the release of 25 Miles to Kissimmee, the group was on the verge of disbanding as a result of prolonged commercial failure. The album Not A Life-Saving Device was released in August 2005. The song "House of Love" from this album was featured on the soundtrack to The Other Side of the Tracks directed by Alejandro Daniel Calvo. In 2008, together with the Italian indie rock band The Mirrors, an EP The Big Eye was released, which included two songs from The Mirrors and "Shine" and "Run" from Not A Life-Saving Device. The Italian magazine Rockit praised the release, noting that the two artists complement each other: Hinkel conveys an MTV-style pop vibe, combined with The Mirrors' rock sound.

In 2009, the EP Heaven And Hell was released, the last Hinkel's solo release to date. On 2 April 2013, a cover version of Oasis' song "Wonderwall" played by Volker was posted in SoundCloud.

=== Collaboration with Camouflage and participation in M.I.N.E ===
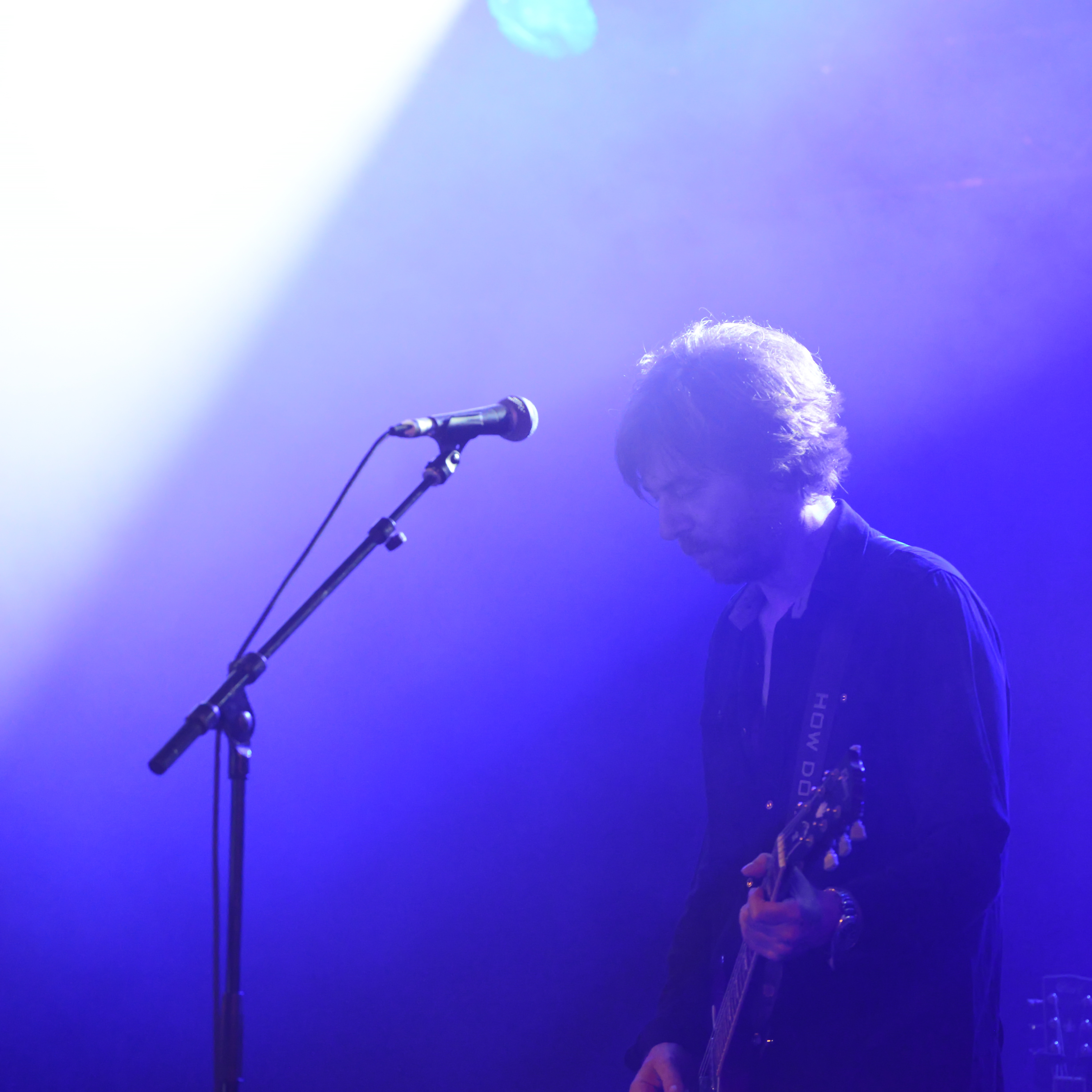
Hinkel touring with Camouflage in 2014

Volker played as a session guitarist during recordings of Sensor (2003) and Relocated (2006) by the German synth-pop band Camouflage, which included Marcus Meyn, Heiko Maile and Oliver Kreyssig. Since 2006, Volker began performing live with Camouflage as touring guitarist and keyboardist, thus forming the band's final live line-up, which also included the drummer Jochen Schmalbach. The participation of Hinkel and Schmalbach in concert performances made it possible to diversify Camouflage's live sound and bring new elements to the band's style beyond electronic music and synth-pop. In 2009, Volker's performance was captured on Live in Dresden, released as a live album and DVD.

By 2015, Marcus Meyn had composed enough material for solo work. At the same time, Heiko Maile and Oliver Kreyssig announced their desire to take a break from music activities after the release of the Greyscale album. As a result, in October 2015, Maile and Kreyssig took a vacation, and Meyn, together with Hinkel and Schmalbach, decided to start a separate project called M.I.N.E.

We are working together on this project since 10 years. I'm living with the idea since the 90s. It was impossible to give Jochen and Volker more input at Camouflage, so it was just a question of time when we start something else together. After Oliver and Heiko decided to have a break from the band, we decided to start M.I.N.E.

— Marcus Meyn.

Despite his participation in writing of the lyrics and music of some songs from the latest Camouflage album, Volker's role was mainly limited to concert shows. In M.I.N.E he and Schmalbach had the opportunity to make a more tangible contribution to the creation of the material. In 2017, M.I.N.E released the first single "Things We've Done" and EP One. The first and so far the only studio album Unexpected Truth Within was released in 2018.

=== Participation in other projects ===
In the beginning of 1990s, Volker Hinkel founded his own record and audio distribution company, Hinkelstone Productions, at which a lot of releases by Fool's Garden and many other artists, including Camouflage, Dirk Blümlein Terzett, Brainstorm, Cae Gauntt, Yannic Guenther, Mira Kay, Daniele Groff, as well as compositions for Toyota and Mercedes-Benz advertisements were recorded, mixed and mastered.

In 1997, Volker Hinkel, together with Peter Freudenthaler, were invited to perform the song "Ordinary Man", included in the soundtrack to the musical "Pico (The Star Club)" (German: "Pico (Das Starclub-Musical)"), by Joachim Gaiser. He also co-wrote the music and lyrics with Freudenthaler for "Engel Sterben Nie" by Hannah Schulz, "Lonny Losseplads" by Bonbon's Bedste Backing Band, "Zironenboom" by Queen Bae and "Dörp-Reggae" and "Dörp-Disco" by Ina Müller.

Volker Hinkel assisted in the experimental study by the German musicologist Hans-Joachim Maempel, the main purpose of which was to determine the extent to which sound design at different stages of music production, including recording, mixing and post-processing, affects the perception and quality evaluation of pop songs. The results of the study were published as in 2001, the author expressed gratitude to Volker for assisting the research and noted the musician among the producers, without whom this work would never have been done.

In 2008, Volker was invited to record the compilation album Beautiful Escape: The Songs of the Posies Revisited, in the same year he participated in the recording of the third studio album Kennzeichen D by German rapper Thomas D. In 2009, Hinkel was included in the jury of The Music Think Tank music competition along with many famous musicians such as Curt Smith, Morgan Fisher, Roger O'Donnell, Jimmy Destri, etc.

In addition to the releases mentioned in the article, Volker participated as a session musician on the albums Der and Punk Gibt's Nicht Umsonst! (Teil III) by Wizo, Catching Rays on Giant by Alphaville, and the single "Netzwerk (Falls Like Rain)" by Klangkarussell. Hinkel also assisted as a sound engineer on the albums Malaria by Schweisser, Don't Wanna Be Everybody's Darlin' by Silke Besa, Annie by Partly Dave, ToyZ by Cinema Bizarre and Goldstadt by Thomas Glöncker.

Hinkel also contributed to Jonas Gavriil's debut album Viertel vor Acht, released in 2026, drawing on his experience as a musician and producer. He supported Gavriil during the album's production and recording and contributed to individual tracks, including the song "Blätter im Wind" and title song, "Viertel vor Acht".

== Soundtracks ==
In addition to collaborating with various musicians, Hinkel has also contributed to creation of film and television soundtracks. In review by the Musik an Sich magazine of the "Alone Against Time" soundtrack, Volker Hinkel, along with Heiko Maile and Christoph Zirngibl, was named one of the three most outstanding German soundtrack composers, and the soundtrack itself received a score of 16 out of 20. Moreover, many Fool's Garden songs composed by Hinkel and Freudenthaler have been included in various soundtracks. For a complete list of soundtracks featuring Volker Hinkel, see the table below.

Year	Title	Type	Directed by	Album	Songs	Notes
1997	Pico (The Starclub)	Musical	Joachim Gaiser	Pico (Das Starclub-Musical)	«Ordinary Man»	(Note: With Peter Freudenthaler.)
2008	The Wave	Film	Dennis Gansel	Die Welle (Original Soundtrack)	List: * «Move It!»; «Swimming»	(Note: With Heiko Maile, Ronda Ray and Trevor Johnson.)
2008	The Other Side of the Tracks	Film	Alejandro Calvo		«House of Love»	(Note: Hinkel is mentioned as performer.)
2009	The Crocodiles	Film	Christian Ditter	Vorstadtkrokodile - Der Original-Soundtrack Zum Kinofilm	List: * «Die Mutprobe»; «Der Einbruch»; «Die Ziegelei»; «Die Krokodile In Aktion»; «Die Nacht Der Entscheidung»; «Freunde Für Immer»; «Vorstadtkrokodile Thema»; «Dennis, Kevin Und Achmed Kommen An»	(Note: Participated as session guitarist and bassist.)
2010	The Crocodiles Strike Back	Film	Christian Ditter	Vorstadtkrokodile 2 - Der Original-Soundtrack Zum Kinofilm	Songs: * «Das Abenteuer Geht Weiter»; «Angriff Der Boller Brüder»; «Die Krokodile Schlagen Zurück»	
2010	We Are the Night	Film	Dennis Gansel	Wir Sind Die Nacht (Original Soundtrack)		(Note: Hinkel's participation is mentioned only in secondary sources, his exact contribution is unknown.)
2011	The Crocodiles: All for One	Film	Wolfgang Groos	Vorstadtkrokodile 3 - Freunde Für Immer		
2012	The Fourth State	Film	Dennis Gansel	Die Vierte Macht - Original Soundtrack		
2015	Little Goat Sturer Bock	Film	Johannes Fabrick	Kleine Ziege Sturer Bock - Original Soundtrack	All	(Note: Participated as session guitarist and also as member of Fool's Garden (song "Piece To My Puzzle").)
2016	Winnetou	Miniseries	Philipp Stölzl	Winnetou - Der Mythos Lebt	List: * «Die Rückkehr»; «Im Herzen Apache»; «Abschied von den Apachen»; «Carmen»; «Der Ölbaron»	(Note: With Heiko Maile, Martin Böttcher, Torsten Kamps, and Alex Scholpp.)
2016	Alone Against Time	TV series	Ceylan Yildirim; Silja Clemens; Stephan Rick	Allein Gegen Die Zeit (Original Soundtrack)	List: * «Der Kuss»; «Lunaris»; «Die Höhle»; «Das Versteck»; «Freunde Auf Dem Prüfstand»; «Wir Sind Zu Spät»; «Dr. Kloppstock»; «Özzi Und Der Cherub»	(Note: With Heiko Maile and Christoph Zirngibl.)
2019	We Are the Wave	Web series	Anca Miruna Lăzărescu; Mark Monheim			
2021	Kitz	Web series	Lea Becker; Maurice Hübner			

== Producer activity ==
In addition to participating in Fool's Garden as a composer and performer, Volker Hinkel has been responsible for producing and promotion of the band's releases.

Hinkel co-wrote and produced Greyscale, the latest release of Camouflage to date, and also promoted it. The album spent 2 weeks on the German Albums Chart, peaking at #14, and was also positively reviewed by several reviewers.

In 1998, Volker Hinkel came up with the arrangement for the first international English-language single "Under My Wing (Is Your Sweet Home)" by the Latvian rock band Brainstorm and later became its executive producer. Due to Hinkel's suggestions, the song began to sound melodic, light, with obvious references to British music of the 1960s, which made the single commercially successful. At first, the single became successful in the Baltic countries, and later began to gain popularity in other parts of Europe. The success of the single laid the ground for the album Among the Suns, which entered several European charts and received positive reviews.

Hinkel also produced Cae Gauntt's album Hopegarden, for which he also composed music for some of the songs, Partly Dave's Annie and Mira Kay's Sister Moon.

== Discography ==
=== Fool's Garden ===
- Once in a Blue Moon (1993)
- Dish of the Day (1995)
- Go and Ask Peggy for the Principal Thing (1997)
- For Sale (2000)
- 25 Miles to Kissimmee (2003)
- Ready for the Real Life (2005)
- Who Is Jo King? (2012)
- Flashback (2015)
- Rise and Fall (2018)
- Captain... Coast Is Clear (2021)

=== Hinkel ===
- In The Wake Of Thunder (1994)
- Not A Life-Saving Device (2005)
- The Big Eye (2008)
- Heaven And Hell (2009)

=== M.I.N.E ===
- One (2017)
- Unexpected Truth Within (2018)
