= Once in a Blue Moon (Fool's Garden album) =

Studio album by Fool's Garden
- Released: 1993
- Recorded: December 1991–July 1992
- Genre: Rock, pop rock
- Length: 53:08
- Label: Intercord
- Producer: Volker Hinkel, Claus Wissler & Bernard Hasebrink

Fool's Garden chronology
Fool's Garden (1991)	Once in a Blue Moon (1993)	Dish of the Day (1995)

Singles from Once in a Blue Moon
- 1. "Spirit '91" / "Once in a Blue Moon" Released: 1992

Once in a Blue Moon is the second album by German rock band Fool's Garden, released in 1993. The album is a re-recording of the band's debut self-titled release with a few differences: the tracks "Spirit Of The Disappeared" and "No Flowers By Request" were removed and "Fall For Her", "Spirit '91" and "Once in a Blue Moon" were added.

This is the last album where singer Peter Freudenthaler and guitarist Volker Hinkel share lead vocals equally.

== Track listing ==
Side one
No.	Title	Writer(s)	Lead vocals	Length
1.	"Awakenings"	Volker Hinkel	Peter Freudenthaler	4:15
2.	"Man in a Cage"	Hinkel, Claus-Dieter Wissler	Volker Hinkel	3:41
3.	"Scared"	Hinkel	Hinkel	1:27
4.	"Careless Games"	Hinkel	Hinkel	3:55
5.	"Sandy"	Peter Freudenthaler	Freudenthaler	5:46
6.	"One Way Out"	Hinkel, Wissler	Hinkel	5:16
7.	"Fall for Her"	Hinkel	Hinkel	4:05
8.	"Cry Baby Cry"	John Lennon, Paul McCartney	Hinkel	2:19
9.	"Lena"	Hinkel, Freudenthaler	Freudenthaler	4:48
10.	"Tell Me Who I Am"	Freudenthaler	Freudenthaler	3:10
11.	"The Part of the Fool"	Hinkel	Hinkel	4:22
12.	"You're Not Forgotten"	Hinkel	Freudenthaler	2:38
13.	"Spirit '91"	Hinkel, Wissler, Freudenthaler	Freudenthaler	4:16
14.	"Once in a Blue Moon"	Hinkel	Freudenthaler	3:10

== Musicians ==
- Peter Freudenthaler - vocals, keyboards
- Volker Hinkel - vocals, guitars, programming
- Roland Röhl - keyboards, backing vocals
- Thomas Mangold - bass, backing vocals
- Ralf Wochele - drums, backing vocals
- Andy Gail - mandolin on "Careless Games"
- Karin Jung, Nicole Freudenthaler, Claudia Tischer and Claudia Müller - backing vocals on "Awakenings" and "Spirit '91"
