= Fools Garden =

German rock band

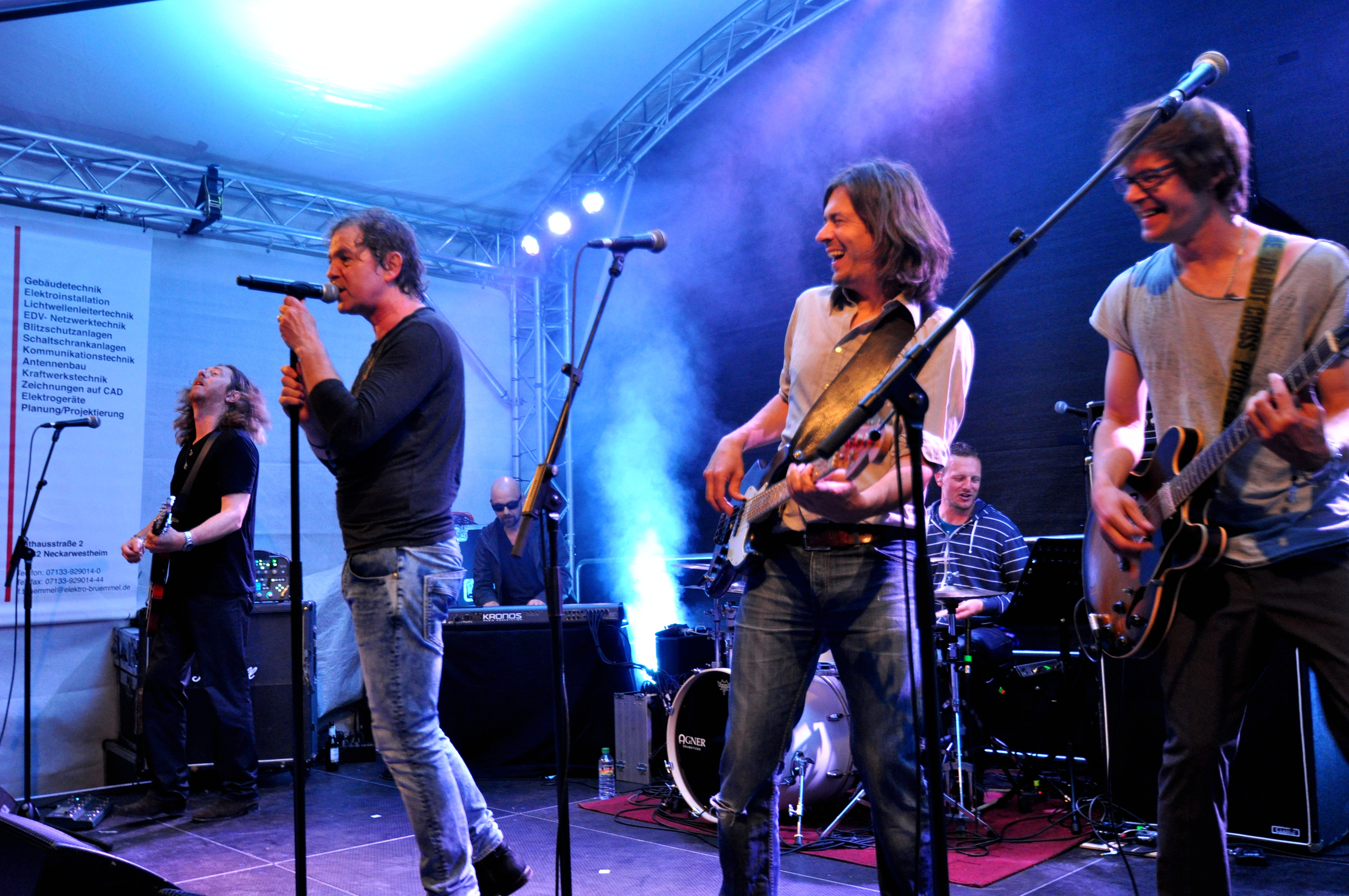
- At Blacksheep Festival 2016

Background information
- Also known as: Fool's Garden (1991–2003)
- Origin: Pforzheim, Germany
- Genres: Pop rock; rock 'n' roll; alternative rock; bubblegum pop; indie pop; soft rock; post-rock
- Years active: 1991–present
- Labels: Town; Intercord; EMI; Sony BMG; Polydor; Lemonade; Seven Days; Jazzhaus
- Members: Peter Freudenthaler; Volker Hinkel; Dirk Blümlein; Gabriel Holz; Thorsten Kiefer; Jan Hees
- Past members: Thomas Mangold; Roland Röhl; Ralf Wochele; Claus Müller
- Website: foolsgarden.de

Fools Garden (known as Fool's Garden until 2003) is a German rock band formed in 1991 in the city of Pforzheim. The founders of the group and its only permanent members are vocalist Peter Freudenthaler and guitarist Volker Hinkel. In 1993, bassist Thomas Mangold, keyboardist Roland Röhl and drummer Ralf Wochele were invited to join Fool's Garden for the recording of their second studio album, Once in a Blue Moon.

The band became famous worldwide in 1995 owing to the release of their third studio album Dish of the Day and, in particular, the song "Lemon Tree", which entered numerous music charts around the world and topped five of them. However, Fool's Garden was never able to repeat the success of their only hit. A series of releases failed to replicate the commercial success of Dish of the Day in 1997, 2000, and 2003, resulting in tension and disagreement amongst the band's members, and dramatically discrediting its reputation in the eyes of record label executives. Consequently, Mangold, Röhl, and Wochele left Fool's Garden in 2003, but a year later new musicians joined the band. To signify the change, it was decided to remove the apostrophe from the band's name on their next album, Ready for the Real Life. Unable to secure a new recording contract, the members of Fools Garden founded their own label, Lemonade Music, in 2004.

Fools Garden's musical style has been characterized as pop rock, soft rock, Britpop, and some other genres. Critics have noted the influence of such artists as The Beatles, Sting, and The Who. The group may be classified as a one-hit wonder.

Since its formation in 1991, the band has released nine studio albums, received 12 music awards, and played over a thousand live performances. The bands's total sales have exceeded 6 million copies. As of 2025, Fools Garden continues to perform, almost exclusively in Germany. The band performs both in complete line-up and as a duo (Hinkel/Freudenthaler) or a trio (Hinkel/Freudenthaler/Holz).

== Background ==
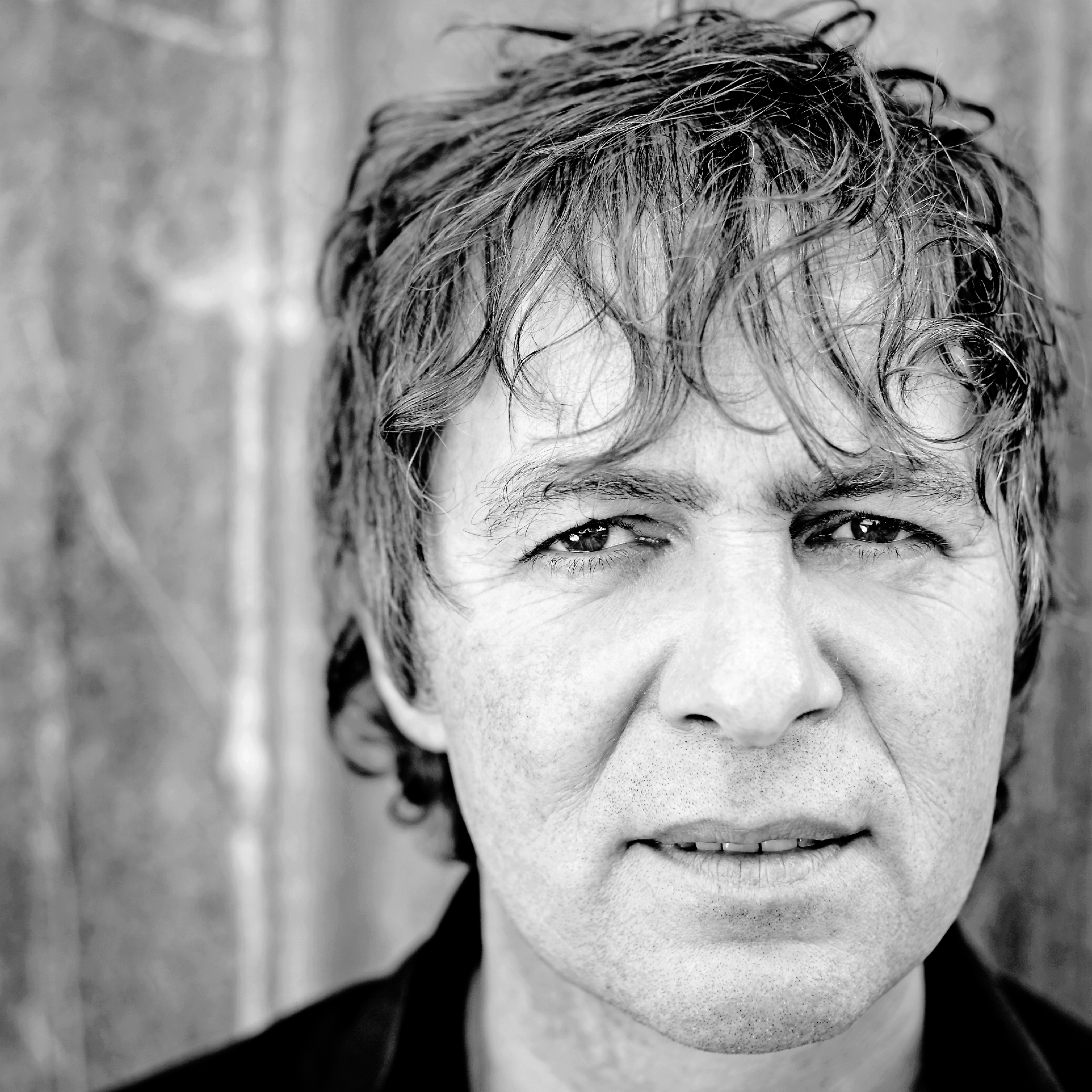
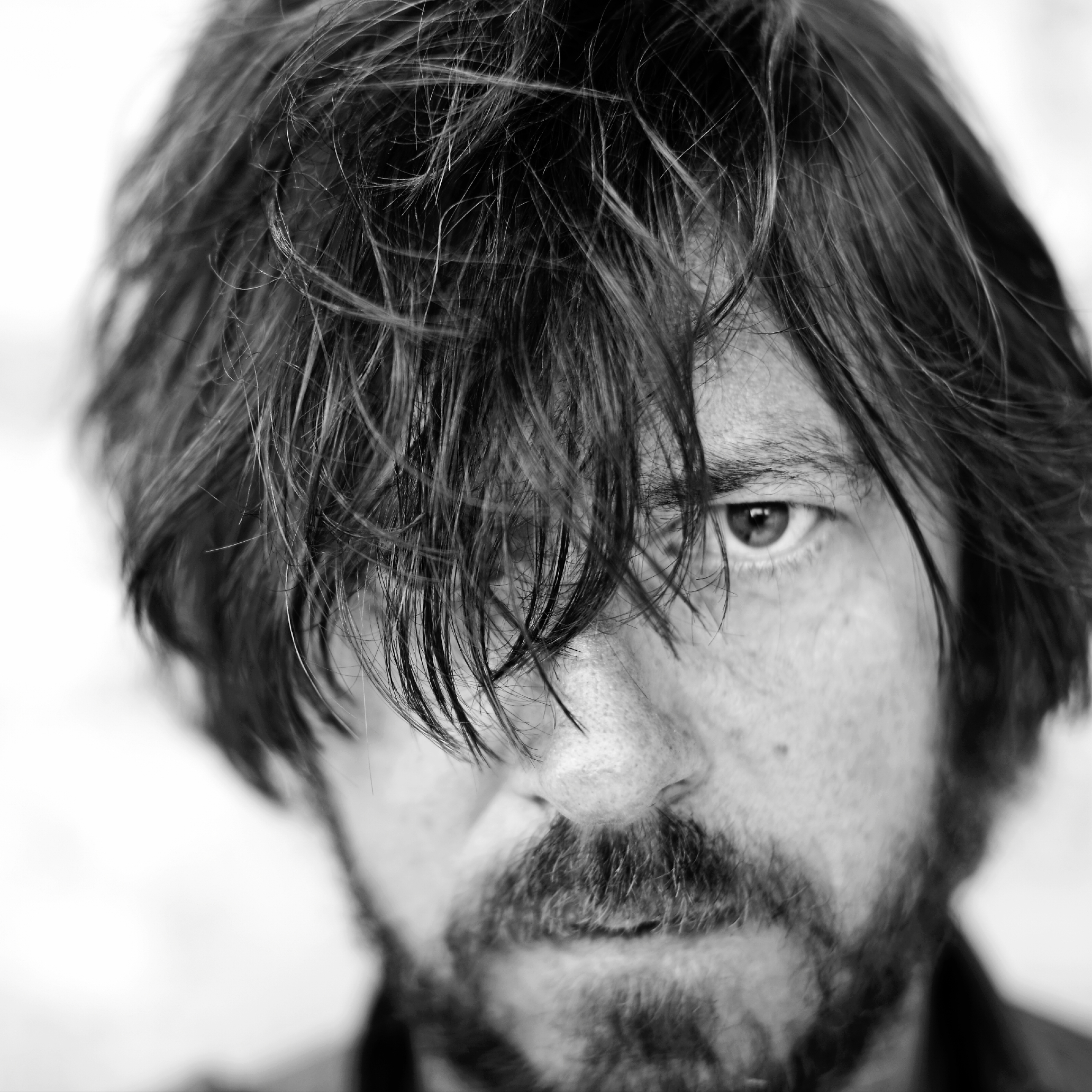
Peter Freudenthaler and Volker Hinkel (both pictured in 2012) are the founding members and the only members of the original lineup still active.

In 1987, Volker Hinkel and Claus-Dieter Wissler founded the music project called Magazine. Together they recorded two songs: "W. A. R." (this song was dedicated to the Gulf War) and "A Time of Life". Later in 1991, Hinkel entered the University of Stuttgart, where he became acquainted with Peter Freudenthaler, who studied multimedia technology. Prior to starting his studies at the university, Peter Freudenthaler had already participated in several musical groups and worked as a piano tuner. Having learned that Freudenthaler also composed music, Hinkel asked him for recordings of his songs ("Sandy" and "Tell Me Who I Am"), and later invited him to Magazine. Hinkel reworked Freudenthaler's arrangement of "Lena", which was the first work of the Hinkel/Freudenthaler duo.

Despite being Germans, the musicians made the decision to write songs in English, as they felt that English was more suitable to their music and the performers who inspired them sang in English as well.

We discovered that we both have a great passion for music and that we have lived only three kilometers apart geographically since childhood. We started to write songs together and quickly realized that it worked really well. So it really had to be some kind of fateful encounter, because the interaction with no one else worked that well before.

— Peter Freudenthaler on acquaintance with Volker Hinkel.

Together they rearranged their compositions and recorded them on a compact cassette. Via Steffen Koch (who became the band's manager for the next few years), this cassette got to Gunter Koch. He listened to Magazine's songs, appreciated them and agreed to collaborate with the band on following recordings. Being inspired by the performance of Oasis, Blur and The Beatles, the musicians chose to play Britpop, despite the fact that it was extremely difficult to achieve any commercial success playing such music, since dance music and techno were especially popular in Germany in those years.

Peter Freudenthaler on band's name

That came out of a beer mood. We sat together in a local pub that evening, ate, drank beer and thought about how to call our new album. "Garden" came into our minds and at some point "Fool's Garden" echoed through the room. Then the name for the album was born. When it came time to start the band, we still liked the name so much that we said we'd just call the whole band "Fool's Garden".

— Interview for Jesus.de.

After a while, Hinkel and Freudenthaler discovered a newspaper advertisement, in which it was proposed to record an album for 130 DM. This is how Magazine was recorded. In addition to the songs recorded on the promo cassette, the album included two songs written by Hinkel with Claus Wissler, as well as a cover version of the song "I Am the Walrus" by The Beatles. This limited edition album was the precursor for the promo album Fool's Garden - Man in a Cage (simply abbreviated as Fool's Garden) released in 1991. They also decided to include a cover version of the song "Cry Baby Cry", which was sung by Volker Hinkel, as well as the songs "Scared" and "No Flowers By Request", which Hinkel recorded with Claus Wissler. In order to perform the recorded material live, it was decided to invite bassist Thomas Mangold, keyboardist Roland Röhl and drummer Ralf Wochele, and rename the band to Fool's Garden. According to Peter Freudenthaler, the name "Fool's Garden" was the most consistent with the band's philosophy and suited the description of its members.

The newly formed band played their first gig in 1991 — Fool's Garden performed as the opening act for Sidney Youngblood in Böblingen.

== History ==
=== Early career and first successes (1991–1994) ===
The eponymous promo-album, which was dedicated to John Winston Lennon, got no recognition. There were only five copies ever produced. The band's first singles "Careless Games / Tell Me Who I Am" and "Once in a Blue Moon / Spirit '91" were released in 1992. Due to the lack of the opportunity to rehearse and record songs in a professional studio, the members of the young band were forced to meet several times a week in the living room of Volker Hinkel's parental home. In the same year, Fool's Garden first appeared on radio, television (TV channels SWR 3 in Stuttgart and Tele 5 in Munich) and began performing their first concerts in Pforzheim, which made them famous in their region.

In 1993, the band decided to re-record the songs from the promo CD and release the first full-length studio album Once in a Blue Moon. It was originally released by the group independently on the Town Music label with a circulation of one thousand copies. The CDs were sold mainly at concerts, sent to local radio and TV stations, and were also given away for free. To promote the new material, Fool's Garden immediately embarked on an extended concert tour throughout Baden-Württemberg and adjoining Bavaria. As Peter Freudenthaler recalled, at that time the band mainly performed in small municipal halls in front of a small audience. According to him, only 20 people came to the first Fool's Garden concert in Munich. It is also worth noting that on Fool's Garden and Once in a Blue Moon, the lead vocals were equally divided between Peter Freudenthaler and Volker Hinkel.

The album Once in a Blue Moon turned out to be a commercial failure, resulting in Town Music label suffering heavy losses and even ending up on the verge of bankruptcy. The company's management was going to cancel the contract with the band, but after a series of negotiations, Steffen Koch managed to convince the head of Town Music to retain the partnership with Fool's Garden until the next studio album was released. Moreover, despite all the efforts of the band and its producer, large companies did not dare to work with Fool's Garden.

"Wild Days" (1994)
A sample of "Wild Days", the first single of Fool's Garden to enter charts.

Fool's Garden achieved their first major success in 1994. The German branch of fashion retailer C&A used "Wild Days", the first single from the band's upcoming studio album for a TV commercial. The song "Wild Days" won a competition from over 700 applicants. Also, the single "Wild Days" became the first release of the group to enter the music charts: the song reached #59 in the German chart (where it lasted 13 weeks) and #37 in Austria. In the same year, Fool's Garden made their first guest appearances in the German interregional newspaper Sonntag aktuell. Wolle Kriwanek, the author of the article, predicted a major success for Fool's Garden after listening to their songs, which just happened a year later.

=== Worldwide commercial success: "Lemon Tree" and Dish of the Day (1995–1996) ===
"Lemon Tree" (1995)
A sample of "Lemon Tree", the major success of Fool's Garden that made them popular worldwidely.

In April 1995, a single with the song "Lemon Tree" was released. It became a real hit and got high positions in many European charts. The atmosphere reminiscent to that of The Beatles' songs, retro sounding in the style of the 1960s, perfect English pronunciation and melancholic lyrics let the song to gain recognition from millions of listeners around the world. Freudenthaler composed it when he was waiting for his girlfriend at home. There were 45 cover versions of the song recorded, and it has also been translated into 40 languages. Due to the lack of support from the major record label, Fool's Garden were forced to record, release and promote new releases on the small Town Records label almost independently.

We did all the groundwork ourselves, by presenting "Lemon Tree" to radio stations and local retailers. Regional private stations started playing it, and we had up to 53 plays per week and about 400 inquiries about the group. When SWF3 [the pop channel of state broadcaster Südwestrundfunk] picked it up, things really got going.

— Steffen Koch, the band's producer, interview for Billboard.

Having noticed the success of Fool's Garden, Intercord, which had previously refused to cooperate with the band, signed a contract with them in November 1995. Intercord CEO Robert Collisch believed that the biggest benefit to Fool's Garden was that they were a real band, not just a project. The album Dish of the Day was released in December 1995, containing the songs "Lemon Tree" and "Wild Days". According to Intercord's report, Dish of the Day became a bestseller in Europe with over 600,000 copies sold and over 1,100,000 copies worldwide. The album entered many charts throughout Europe. Both "Lemon Tree" and Dish of the Day sold best in Austria and Switzerland. Fool's Garden's songs were played on radio stations around the world, from San Diego to Jakarta. The song also enjoyed success in the UK, where it peaked at #61 on the UK Singles Chart, and the remix version also entered the chart, peaking at a higher #26. According to Intercord, the band had great potential to play internationally. Due to Intercord, "Lemon Tree" and Dish of the Day achieved particular success in Southeast Asia: the song received the "Song of the Year" award from Metro Broadcast Corporation Ltd. in Hong Kong, and Taiwanese singer Tarcy Su has recorded covers in Mandarin and Cantonese Chinese. The album received gold certification in Thailand, platinum certification in Singapore, Taiwan and double platinum one in Malaysia.

Between March and May 1996, Fool's Garden had played about 50 concerts with an approximate audience of 700 people at each concert. In the summer of the same year, the quintet participated in 14 open-air concerts, performing as an opening act for the German pop rock band Pur, however already in the autumn Fool's Garden began touring as headliners. Between the 14th and 16 June 1996, Fool's Garden performed as headliners at the Open Flair music festival with such famous German performers as Marla Glen, Selig and Jazzkantine, and on 5 July, the band performed with Joan Osborne, Suede, Blur and Iggy Pop at the Midtfyns Festival in Ringe, Denmark. In the same year, Intercord reissued the album Once in a Blue Moon, however, despite the excitement around the band after the success of "Lemon Tree", the album neither entered the charts nor received any certification. Also in 1996, Fool's Garden's music first appeared in German cinema: the song "Wild Days" was included on the soundtracks for the film "Regular Guys" and the TV series "Freunde fürs Leben".

=== Worldwide tour and release of Go and Ask Peggy for the Principal Thing (1997–1999) ===
Nobody would have anything against a new big hit, but I think, even if we would have it like the "Lemon Tree", it would not be the same anymore. Because this opens so many doors for the very first time in our lives: we'd been the first time on the plane for a concert, we'd been the first time outside Europe, we'd been the first time outside of Germany for a concert, for a radio show, for a TV show - everything was for the first time with that song. Another big hit would not ever bring the same feeling again.

— Peter Freudenthaler, from "25 Years To New World" documentary.

The success of 1995-1996 brought the band a number of awards, including ECHO, Goldene Stimmgabel, Goldene Europa, Bambi and R.SH Gold.

Following the commercial success of "Lemon Tree" and Dish of the Day, the band embarked on a worldwide concert tour, playing over 100 shows around the world. The number of listeners at the concerts reached up to 80,000. Fool's Garden have played in Europe outside Germany, North America, South Africa, and Asia, where it has achieved the greatest success. Touring in Italy and Spain was also successful. According to Thomas Mangold and Roland Röhl, at that time the members of the band had an income of about 1,500 Deutsche Mark per month. This allowed them to quit their regular jobs and take up professional musical careers.

"Probably" (1997)
A sample of "Probably". The backing vocals of Volker Hinkel can be also heard throughout the recording.

After returning from the world tour, the musicians began working on a new album. As Fool's Garden members became professional musicians and stopped spending time on regular work, new material was prepared very quickly: the songs were composed just in two months, and the process of recording took only six months - it began in January 1997 and lasted until July. Recording and mixing took place at Maryland and Hinkelstone Studio. The third album, Go and Ask Peggy for the Principal Thing, was released on 8 September 1997. Three months before the official release in order to promote the disc, a single with the song "Why Did She Go?" was released, which managed to stay on the German singles chart for 9 weeks, reaching #76. The song has also been suggested to be used for an automobile advertisement. Another notable song is "Probably", which was recognized as the group's second major success after "Lemon Tree". The single with the song peaked at #86 in the German chart, staying there for 8 weeks. Also "Probably" received serious support from radio stations and in 1997 almost entered the top 50 most played songs in Europe. In the same year, "Probably" was featured on the soundtrack for the TV series Kommisar Rex.

Despite Intercord's hopes that the new album will sell out in large numbers on the wave of the popularity of the previous platinum album Dish of the Day, Go and Ask Peggy for the Principal Thing did not repeat the success of its predecessor. It took only #44 in Germany and #50 in Switzerland. According to the Russian musical agency Zvuki.Ru, the reason for such failure was "absence of a title hit." In 1998, Fool's Garden performed at the German Cultural Days in Singapore.

=== Commercial failures and line-up changes (2000–2003) ===
Three years later, on 5 June 2000, Fool's Garden released their next studio album For Sale, which was produced by James Herter, on the Seven Days Music label. The name "For Sale" reflected the situation in the band at that time — after the breakup of the Intercord/EMI label, the band was literally put up for sale. The first single "Suzy" stayed on the German singles chart for 8 weeks, reaching #75. After the release of the album, the band arranged a promotional tour in Germany and also organized an autograph session in Munich. On 18 June, Fool's Garden performed in Singapore at the Radio Music Awards. Also on 24 July, the band performed in Ulm at a concert organized annually by the local radio station Radio 7. For Sale was released all over the world: in Europe, South Africa, Mexico, South Korea, Taiwan, Singapore, Thailand, Indonesia, Japan and the Philippines. Despite the vast geographic variety of the release and the band's efforts to promote the new material, the album turned out to be a commercial failure, it also did not achieve chart success: For Sale took #84 on the German albums chart, staying with this result for only 1 week. An attempt to release something similar to the biggest hit of the group "Lemon Tree" also failed — for 3 weeks in the German singles chart the song "It Can Happen" could not rise above #86.

One of the versions of 25 Miles to Kissimmee album cover. Members of Fool's Garden shortly before the breakup, from left to right: Roland Röhl, Thomas Mangold, Peter Freudenthaler, Volker Hinkel, Ralf Wochele.

In 2001, Fool's Garden signed a contract with another record label Polydor. In September of the same year, the band celebrated their 10th anniversary with a two-day party in Pforzheim, which featured many well-known German bands. The proceeds from this event were donated to charity through the Nordoff-Robbins Music Therapy Foundation. Also in 2001, the band began work on their next studio album. The new CD 25 Miles to Kissimmee was ready to be released in early 2002, but due to delays on the part of Polydor Records, the album was not released until 17 January 2003. Due to another unsuccessful album, tension and disagreements occurred between the musicians. As a result, on 19 April of the same year, rumors appeared in the press that Fool's Garden had disbanded. Bassist Thomas Mangold, keyboardist Roland Röhl and drummer Ralf Wochele left the band. After leaving Fool's Garden, Thomas Mangold and Roland Röhl started an advertising agency and a print shop for production of CD and DVD covers in Merklingen. Mangold continued his musical career playing bass with many different bands. Ralf Wochele got a job as a music teacher at a school, and was also accepted into the band called CoverUp, in which he still participates.

Actually, the band hadn't split up, we just parted with our former fellow musicians. We were at a point where it wasn't really fun anymore. The basic goal was to be able to do what we enjoyed a lot. When that fun was lost, we said to ourselves that we had to act very quickly and be careful not to let this boat sink, but to get it started again with a new crew.

— Peter Freudenthaler.

Hinkel and Freudenthaler decided to pursue their musical careers as a duo. However, they faced a number of problems in the further promotion of the album 25 Miles to Kissimmee, as due to the breakup of the band Polydor refused to cooperate further with Fool's Garden. Therefore, the remaining members of the band formed their own label Lemonade Music. Soon, guitarist Gabriel Holz, bassist Dirk Blümlein and drummer Claus Müller were invited to the group for live performances. The last two musicians have collaborated with Volker Hinkel since 2002 on his solo project Hinkel, in particular on the album Not a Life-Saving Device. Changes in the line-up were also marked in the name of the band: from that time on, it became known as Fools Garden (without an apostrophe).

=== New line-up and musical style (2004–2013) ===
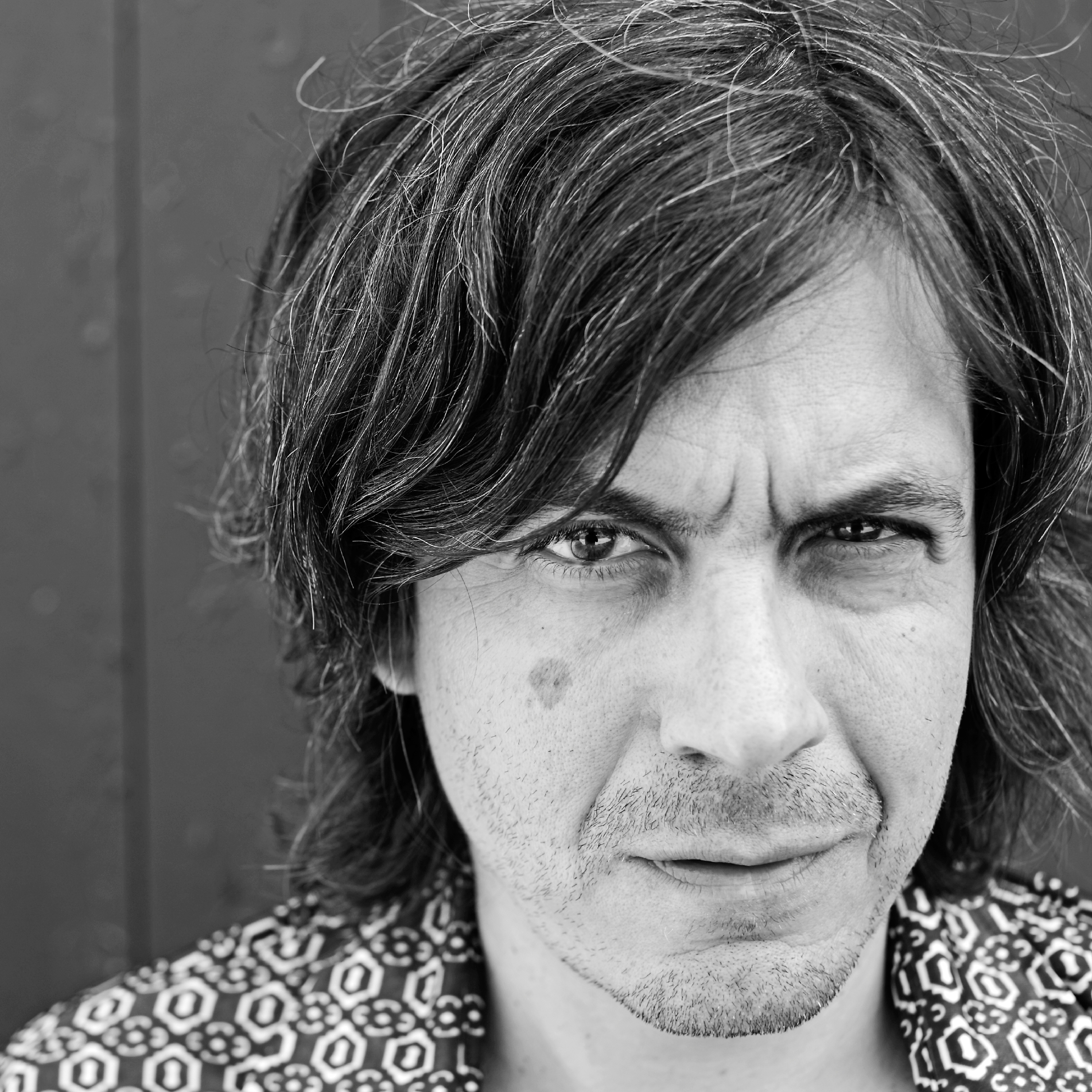
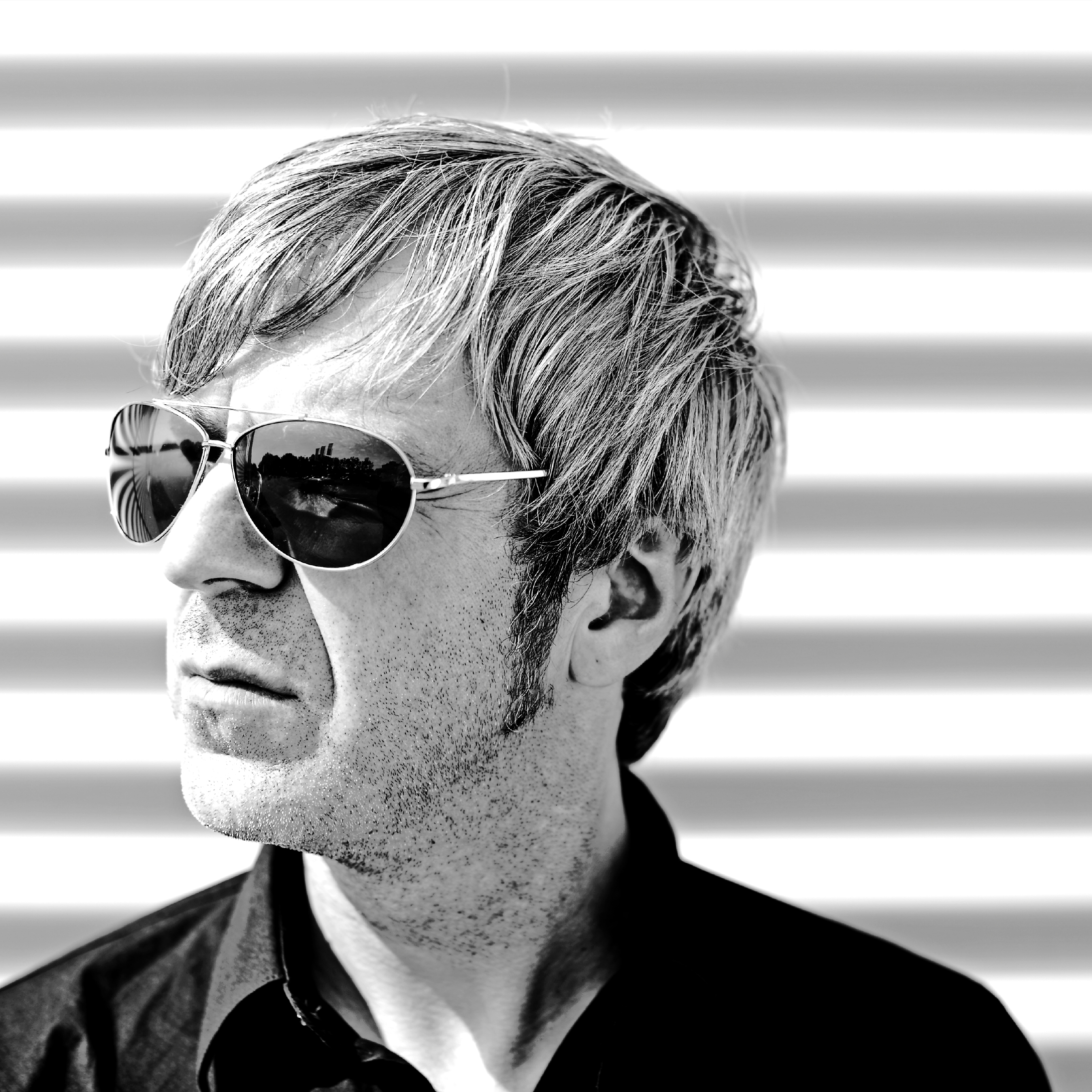
Bassist Dirk Blümlein and drummer Claus Müller joined Fools Garden after the release of Ready for the Real Life.

Volker Hinkel, Peter Freudenthaler and new musicians recorded the album Ready for the Real Life, which was released in the autumn of 2005. As soon as the work on the album was completed, Blümlein, Holz and Müller were invited to Fools Garden as permanent members. For the purpose of promoting the album, the single "Does Anybody Know? / Welcome Sun" was released in the summer of 2005. Critics noted a change in band's musical style: Fools Garden moved away from Britpop and switched to guitar-based melodic rock. The new musical style allowed the band to enter the airplay of radio stations again and the songs from Ready for the Real Life to become the soundtracks for various films, TV shows and commercials. On 3 July 2005, the band played their biggest concert, performing at the festival dedicated to the 750th anniversary of Kaliningrad. In total, the concert attracted over 100,000 listeners. Also in 2005, Fools Garden was honored with the Ravensburger Kupferle Award. In 2007 Gabriel Holtz left the band and returned to his native Neukölln.

In 2008–2009, Fools Garden released two new EPs, Napster Session 2008 and Home, as well as a compilation album High Times - The Best of Fools Garden and a live album Best Of Unplugged - Live. The compilation also contained a new song "High Time", which was released as a single. The song reached high positions in the charts of listeners of various radio stations, for example, Hessischer Rundfunk.

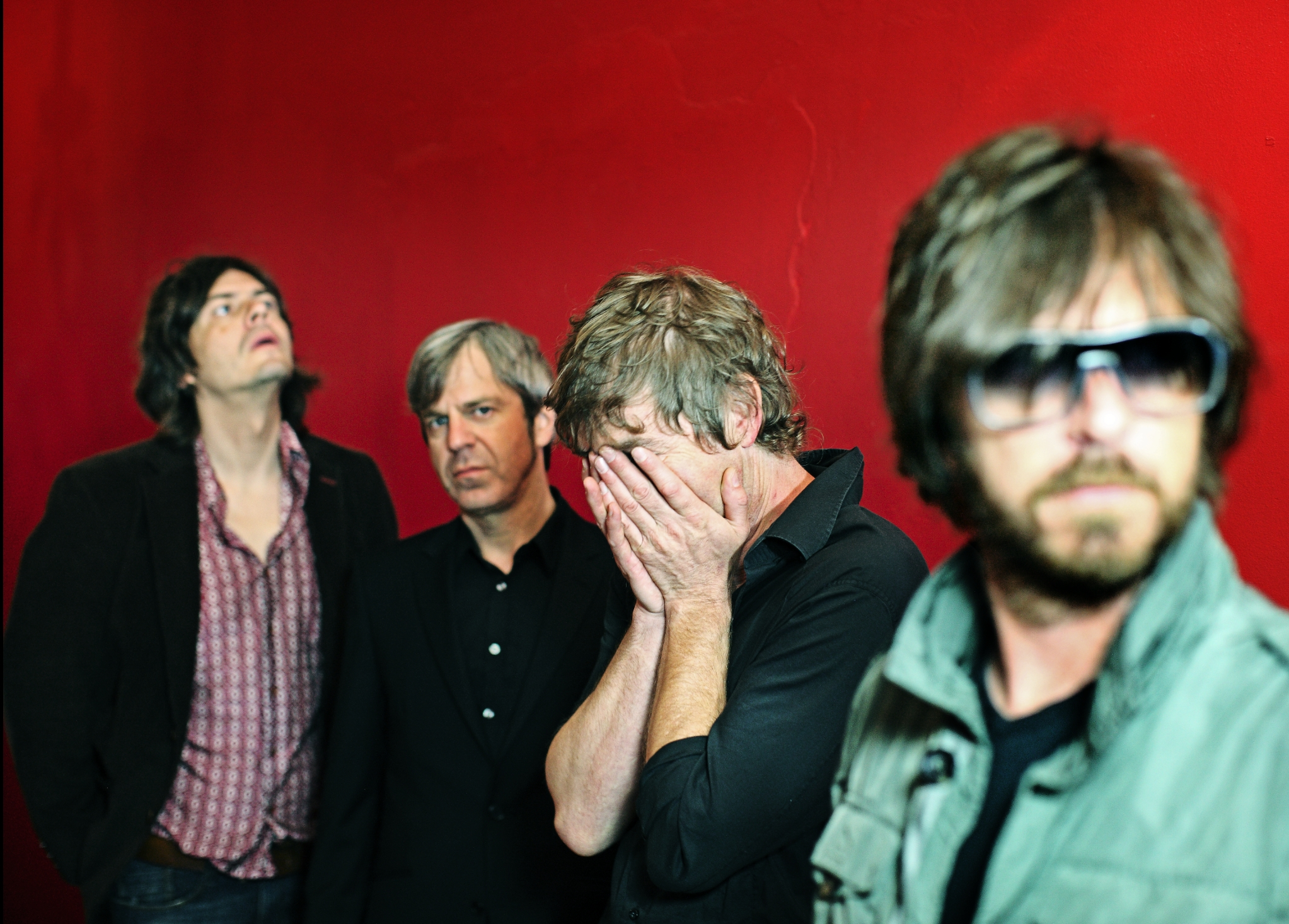
Fools Garden in 2012

In 2011, the band celebrated their 20th anniversary by performing at a charity concert with the Pforzheim Chamber Orchestra. In the same year, Fools Garden began writing material for a new release, which was recorded in the first half of 2012 in England. In July of the same year, the new single "Innocence" was presented to a number of radio stations, and in August it reached number one on the SW3 listeners' chart. A video clip was also filmed for the song, which the band members created on their own. The seventh album Who Is Jo King? was released on 14 September. The cover artwork was created by Klaus Voormann, known for designing the cover for The Beatles Revolver in 1966. This explains the noticeable similarity between the two covers.

In early 2013, the second single from Who Is Jo King? "Maybe" was released. In the same year, Fools Garden performed at the German Festival at the Brandenburg Gate.

=== Second line-up change (2014–present) ===
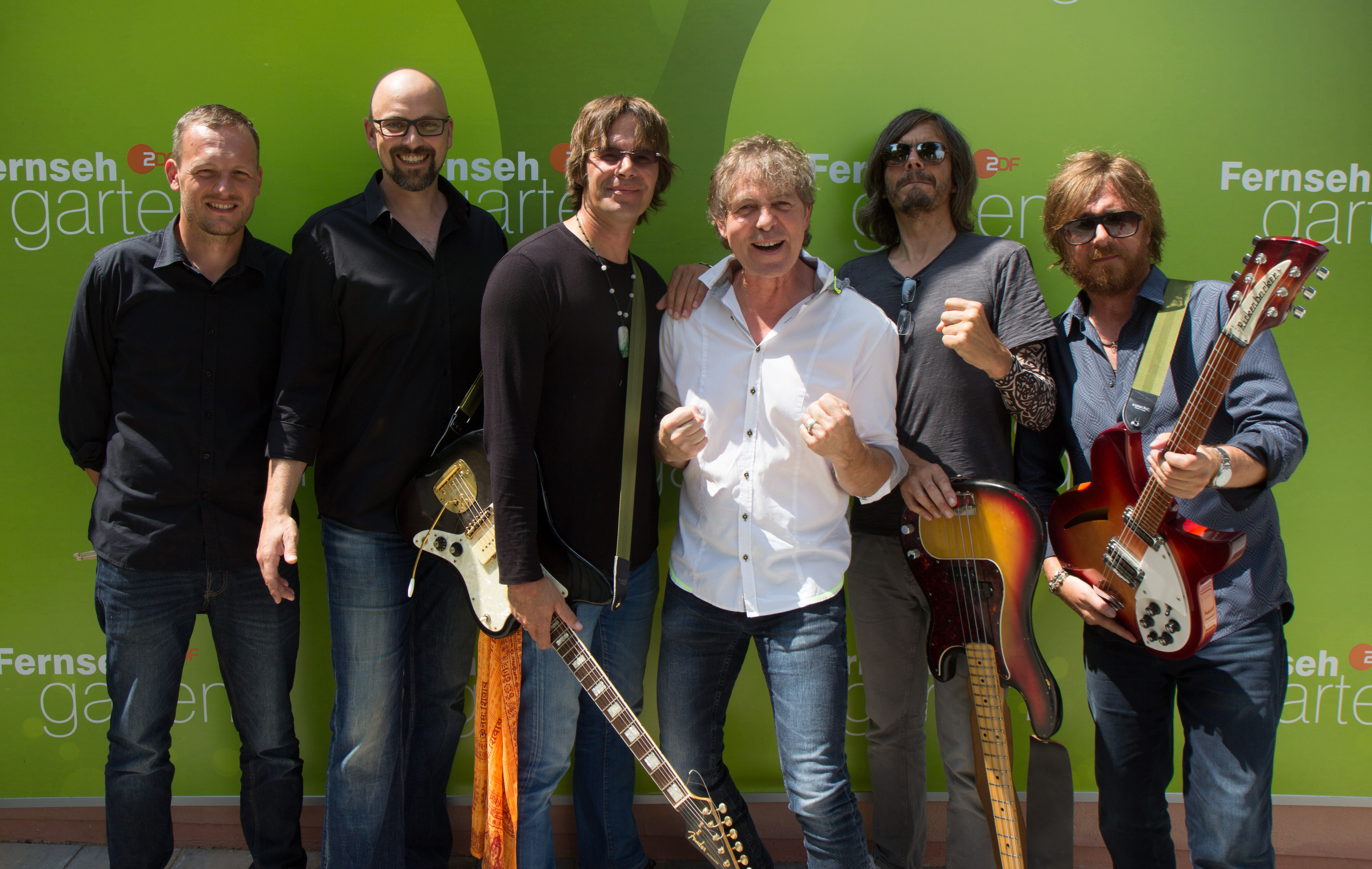
New line-up of Fools Garden; left to right: Jan Hees, Thorsten Kiefer, Gabriel Holz, Peter Freudenthaler, Dirk Blümlein and Volker Hinkel

The band's line-up changed again in 2014–2015. First of all, Gabriel Holz returned to Fools Garden in the autumn of 2014. In early 2015, keyboardist Torsten Kiefer joined the band, whereas in the early summer of the same year, drummer Claus Müller left the group and was replaced by Jan Hees. In 2015, Fools Garden performed cover versions of ten 1990s hit songs by various artists such as Depeche Mode, Annie Lennox, the Backstreet Boys, Bruce Springsteen, No Doubt and Madonna in their usual unique style for the third season of the RTL 90s-themed music show "Formula 1". For ten consecutive weeks, Fools Garden performed each song under the moderation of Peter Illmann. It was decided to release these cover versions on an album called Flashback.

At the end of 2016, Fools Garden together with the German jazz singer Karl Frierson recorded a new song "New World", which was released in early 2017. In the same year, the 10-episode documentary "25 Years to New World" was released on the band's official YouTube channel.

In April 2018, Fools Garden released their next album Rise and Fall, which was recorded at the band's own studio in Neuhausen. It was the first time when Gabriel Holz participated in composition of all the songs, along with Peter Freudenthaler and Volker Hinkel. It's the band's first album since 2000's For Sale to enter the German charts, reaching #97 between 7 and 13 May 2018. Maxazine named the album "the best since Dish of the Day and successor Go and Ask Peggy for the Principal Thing", and Musikreviews.de called Rise and Fall "the best album since 1995." To promote the new material, Fools Garden embarked on an extensive concert tour across Germany. Peter Freudenthaler and Volker Hinkel also expressed their desire to do a concert tour in the UK someday.

During the COVID-19 pandemic, Fools Garden organized the online festival on Instagram called "Garden Festival". It was held on 1 May 2020, and was also associated with a fundraising campaign organized by the Rotary Club Pforzheim. In the summer of the same year, Peter Freudenthaler, Volker Hinkel and Jan Hees took part in the recording of songs "ABCD" and "La-rissa" of the Italian music project La Crisi Di Luglio. At the moment the band is working on a new album. The first song "Outta Love" recorded in electro-pop genre was released on 25 September.

On 24 November 2022 it was announced that BMG Rights Management had acquired the recordings catalog of Fools Garden.

In 2024, Fools Garden released an EP, Lemon Tree, as limited edition release for Record Store Day.

== Musical style, influence and legacy ==
=== General characteristics and development ===
Peter Freudenthaler and Volker Hinkel on band's musical style

Being compared to The Beatles is a big and not entirely deserved compliment. Of course, in today's guitar pop music, it's impossible to do without someone else's influence. On the other hand, in order to be successful, the group must still have identity. Whatever they say, Fool's Garden has its own style. We ourselves have heard how they already say about some young German groups: "Oh! Sounds like Fool's Garden!"

— Interview for Chas newspaper.

Critics classify Fools Garden's musical style as fusion of pop rock, soft rock, alternative rock, rock and roll, bubblegum pop, indie pop, Britpop, and post rock. Various sources also highlighted the elements of psychedelic rock, music hall, baroque pop, punk rock, power pop, indie rock, electronic rock, dream pop, dance music, synth-pop and new wave in the band's sound.

Russian newspaper Kommersant wrote that listeners usually learn about Fools Garden due to plays on retro-oriented radio stations (the vast majority includes the song "Lemon Tree"), but over the period of its existence the band has released many good albums. It was also mentioned that the band's style has similarities with both dance music and rock. In another article of the same newspaper, it was noted that the group has an attitude towards "old-fashioned pop-rock", but the band's material is quite diverse: "there are things that are heavier and softer, there are ballads and fierce songs, sometimes Freudenthaler even uses autotune." The clear influence of psychedelic rock has been noted in the songs "And You Say", "Suzy", "Rainy Day", "Noone's Song" and "Northern Town", and the author of the website Zvuki.Ru also mentioned that Fool's Garden play songs that fans of melodic rock may adore.

"Rain" (2005)
A sample of "Rain" from Ready for the Real Life. After the first line-up change Fools Garden abandoned Britpop that characterized their sound in 1990s and focused on melodic rock music.

Joerg Hellwig, head of marketing at Intercord, told Billboard that Fool's Garden's music is "colorful guitar pop with a British touch and clear references to this genre's great tradition, which was perfected by The Beatles and have never been surpassed." The band members tried to avoid the use of electro elements and other effects and relied on acoustics to try to achieve a natural sound of the music. By the same edition, the band's style was characterized as Middle of the Road. A critic from Music & Media, describing the musical style of Dish of the Day, noted that the sound of Fool's Garden is based on the style of The Beatles, but the sound of guitars is closer to rock, and the song "Lemon Tree" was described as a mixture of circus music and bubblegum pop of the late 60s with signature melodies. In a review by Danish magazine Gaffa on the next album, Go and Ask Peggy for the Principal Thing, Lars Nielsen wrote that the release continues the "light airy melody" of its predecessor. In an interview for Billboard on the release of For Sale, the band's producer Steffen Koch noted that the band's songs have matured, with a more rock emphasis, while maintaining a Beatlesque sound. The songs in 25 Miles to Kissimmee were mostly melodic rock ballads. After the line-up change, Fools Garden moved away from Britpop and on the following album Ready for the Real Life they switched to "guitar-oriented rock". The style of the song "Cook It a While" was compared to the US West Coast rock. The album Who Is Jo King? was characterized by a strong bias towards indie pop, while certain elements of dance and electronic music started to be introduced into the band's sound. On their latest album Rise and Fall, Fools Garden returned to their original style, while continuing to experiment with sound. For example, the song "Still Running" was completely recorded in synth pop style.

=== Influence on the group's style ===
Volker Hinkel on similarities with The Beatles

If you're making pop music with melodies, then it will remind you of The Beatles. There is no way out of this but that's good, isn't it?

— Interview for Reuters.

The Beatles were noted by many critics as the main artist to impact on the style of Fool's Garden. The typical Beatles' retro atmosphere and melancholic lyrics were observed in the sound of the band's songs. Both Peter Freudenthaler and Volker Hinkel have frequently named The Beatles as their main source of inspiration and creative ideas. Fool's Garden's musical style has been repeatedly described as being based on the work of The Beatles but with a heavier sound of guitars. In 2012, in the Russian talk show "Profilaktika", Freudenthaler and Hinkel were asked who was the most important person in Fools Garden, and both of them instantly replied 'Beatles.' The similarity in sound with the British inspirers turned out to be so strong that many listeners mistakenly attribute the authorship of the song "Lemon Tree" to them. In addition to the Fab Four, Fool's Garden' style was also compared with the sound of Blur and Simple Minds. The members also ranked Oasis, The Who and Coldplay as influential artists.

Lev Gankin from the Kommersant newspaper found "Lemon Tree" similar to the songs of Paul McCartney, stating "The romantic minor of verses, followed by a lively major in the choruses - something similar can be heard in countless McCartney hits, starting with the old "All My Loving". Also, according to other reviewers, the style of "Lemon Tree" was influenced by Sting and Jellyfish in terms of harmony and instrumental parts. Another example of Paul McCartney's influence on the band's style is the song "Probably".

The song "Suzy" has a borrowing from Led Zeppelin's "Stairway to Heaven": Robert Plant's vocal wail at the end of the original song was transformed into a synth riff in the bridge of "Suzy". Brian May from Queen was named as the source of inspiration for Volker Hinkel in writing guitar solos. The spread of elements of electronic music in the sound of recent albums is thought to be influenced by Moby and A-ha. Different critics describe several songs as being influenced by The Kinks, Pink Floyd, Fury in the Slaughterhouse, U2 and Eagle-Eye Cherry.

The members of Fools Garden also told they adore the music of Pat Metheny, Pete Townshend, Heintje Simons, Status Quo, Noel Gallagher, Half Moon Run, AC/DC, The Rolling Stones, Scorpions and Udo Lindenberg.

=== Appraisal ===
Fool's Garden are considered followers of the Britpop wave that swept the world in the 90s, and the most prominent representatives of the German Britpop scene. The band is also one of the most iconic German performers on the international music scene along with the Scorpions, E-rotic, Fun Factory and Mr. President. Wolfgang Spahr, the German Bureau Chief of Billboard, presented Fool's Garden the "Ambassador Award" for great success in Asia in the 1996's final issue.

Fool's Garden have been recognized a famous one-hit wonder. While the band did not have any commercially successful singles after "Lemon Tree", various sources highlight other songs: "Wild Days", "It Can Happen", "Why Did She Go?", "Innocence", "Probably", "Suzy", "Closer", "Dreaming" and "Does Anybody Know?". In the interview for Frankfurter Allgemeine, Peter Freudenthaler stated that he thought about many songs that they would become hits, but this never happened.

We all realised that it was impossible to make a follow-up of the song - if we deliberately wrote a similar song, then everybody would say that we were copying ourselves, so we just write whatever we want to but not what people want us to do, I think that's the best way for us to go on.

— Volker Hinkel, interview for South China Morning Post

In 2012, Alexander Rusakov, in his book "Who is Who, or MUZPROSVET in Global Contemporary Popular Music", put Peter Freudenthaler on #792 in the rating of 1000 best musicians of global contemporary popular music for participation in Fool's Garden. The band was mentioned to play a fundamental role in the formation of modern retro-rock trends. In the magazine Novyi Ochevidets, the song "Lemon Tree" was named the main German hit of the 90s. Frontman Peter Freudenthaler said in an interview for the Chas newspaper that Fool's Garden is "the third German band after the Scorpions and Modern Talking, which has gained worldwide popularity".

The band's songs can be found many times in popular culture. In the mid-1990s, Applause Inc., which owns the rights to the Smurfs franchise, released a compilation album Smurfenhits!, containing the song "Lemon Tree", recorded with the voice of the Smurfs, which bolstered sales for the company. Also, references to Fool's Garden and the songs "Lemon Tree" and "Rolling Home" can be found in modern fiction. During the 1996 Men's Ice Hockey World Championships, "Lemon Tree", being at its peak of popularity, was played at every match of the Czech national team, thereby becoming a kind of anthem for the team. It is noteworthy that in this championship the Czechs won a gold medal for the first time in their history.

== Band members ==
Current line-up of the band
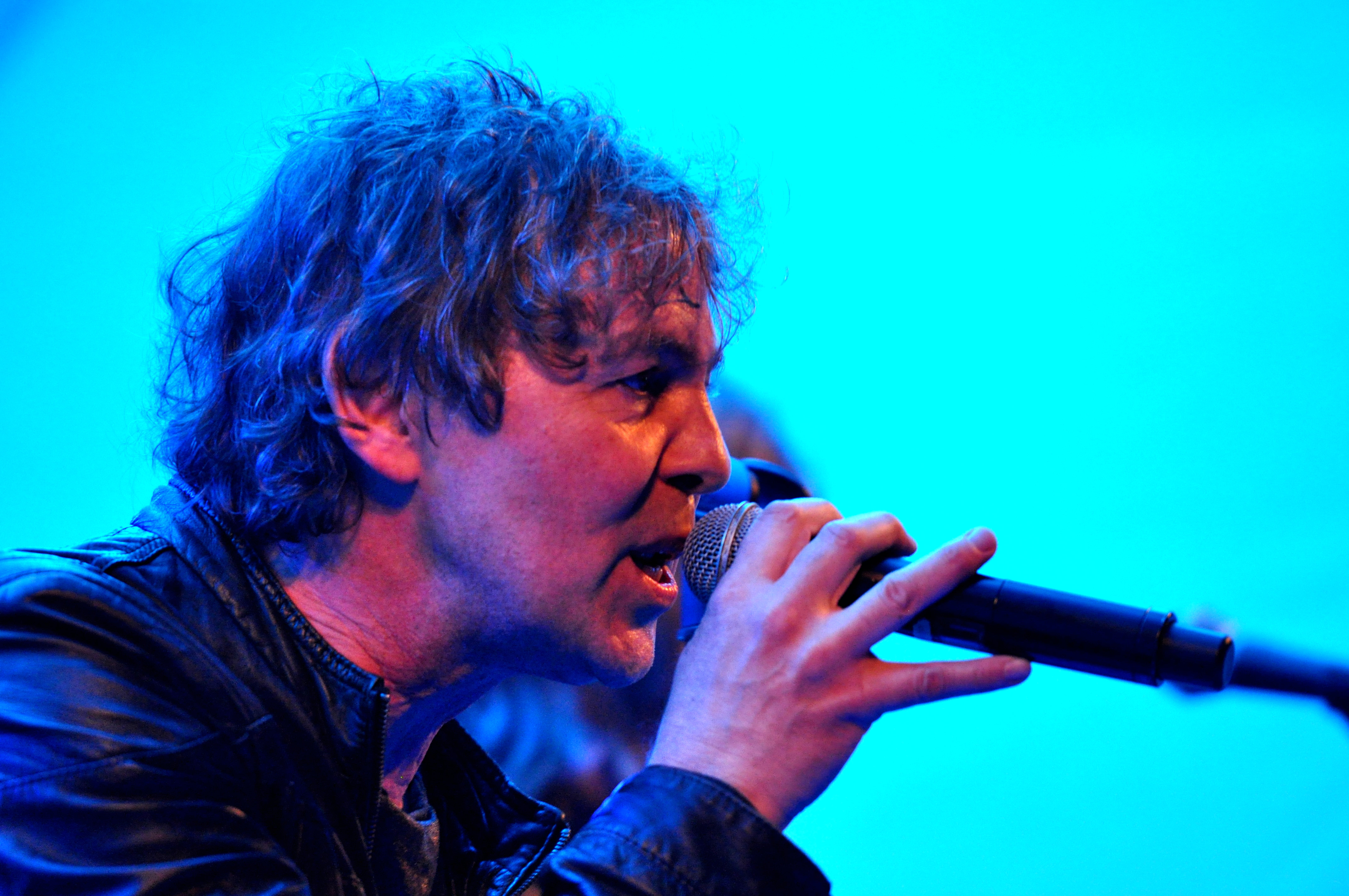
Peter Freudenthaler

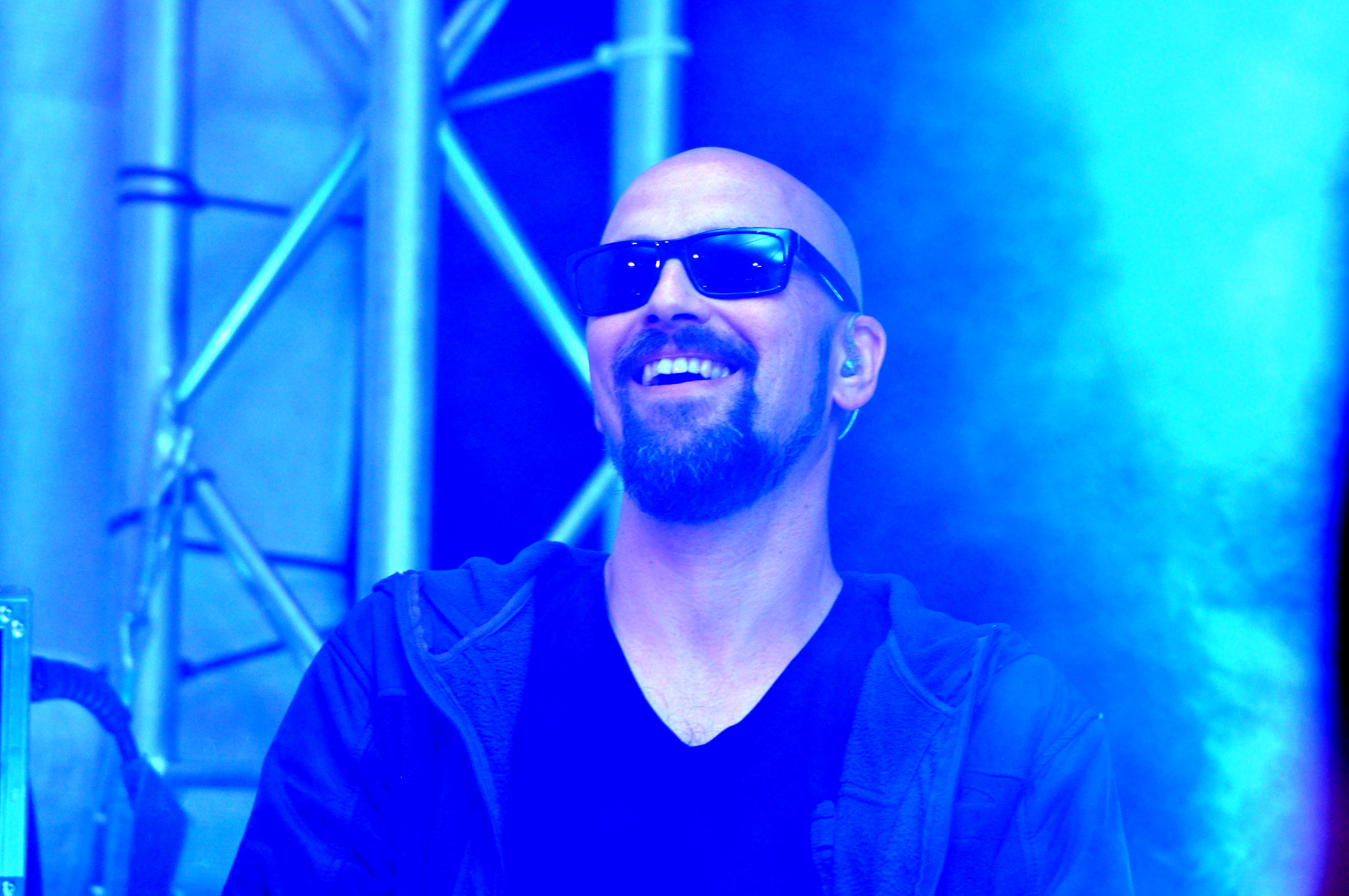
Thorsten Kiefer

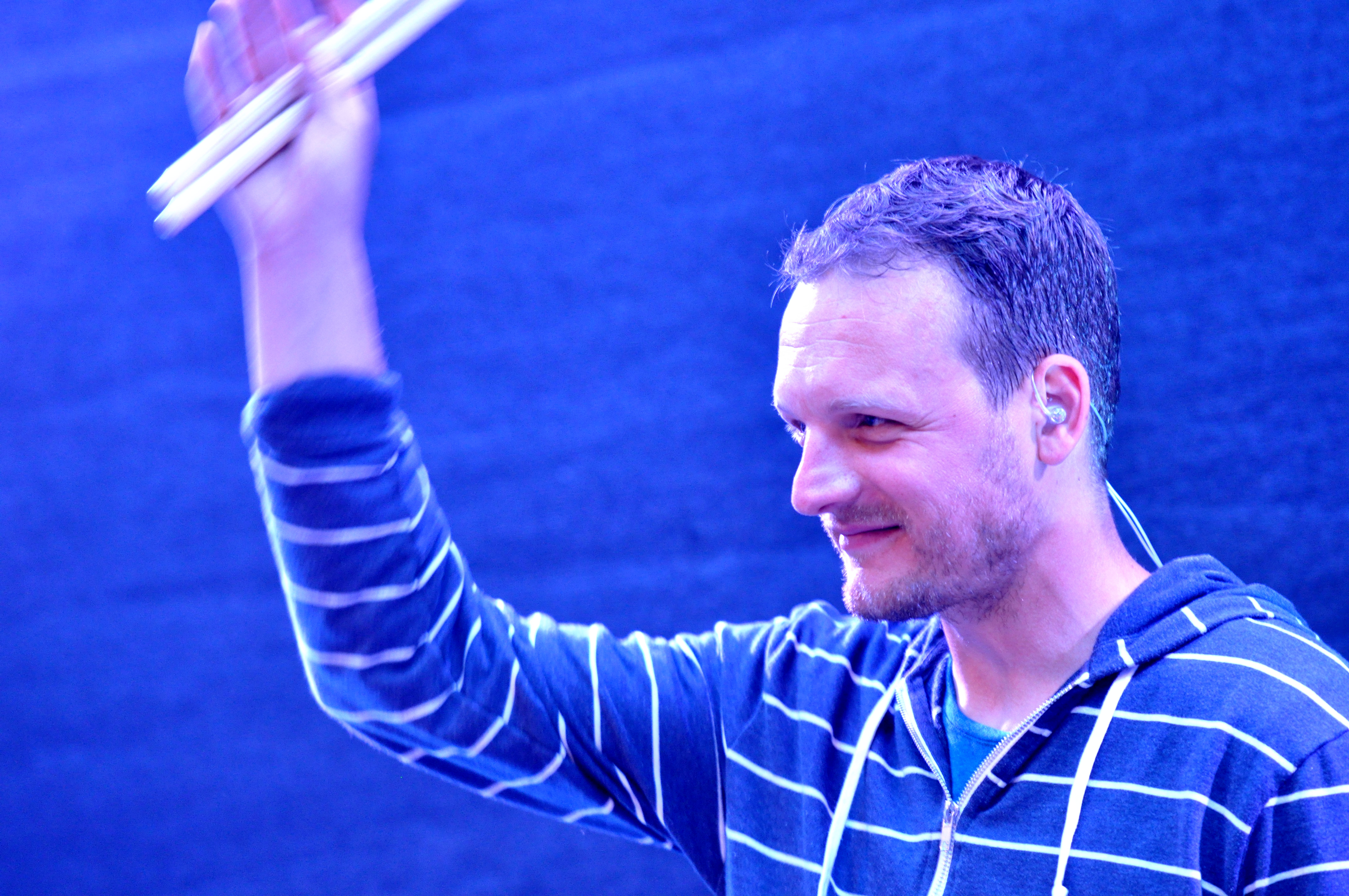
Jan Hees

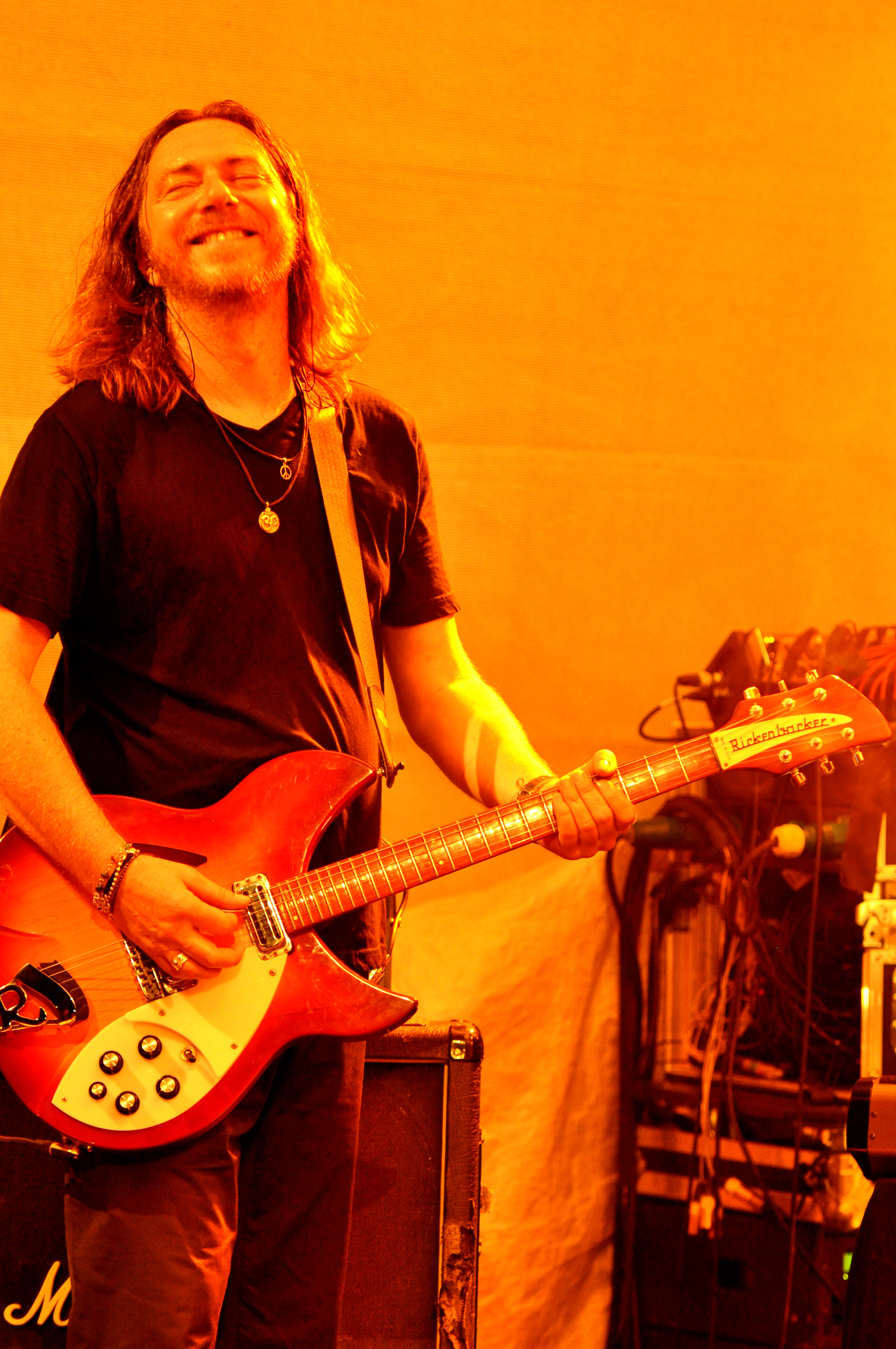
Volker Hinkel

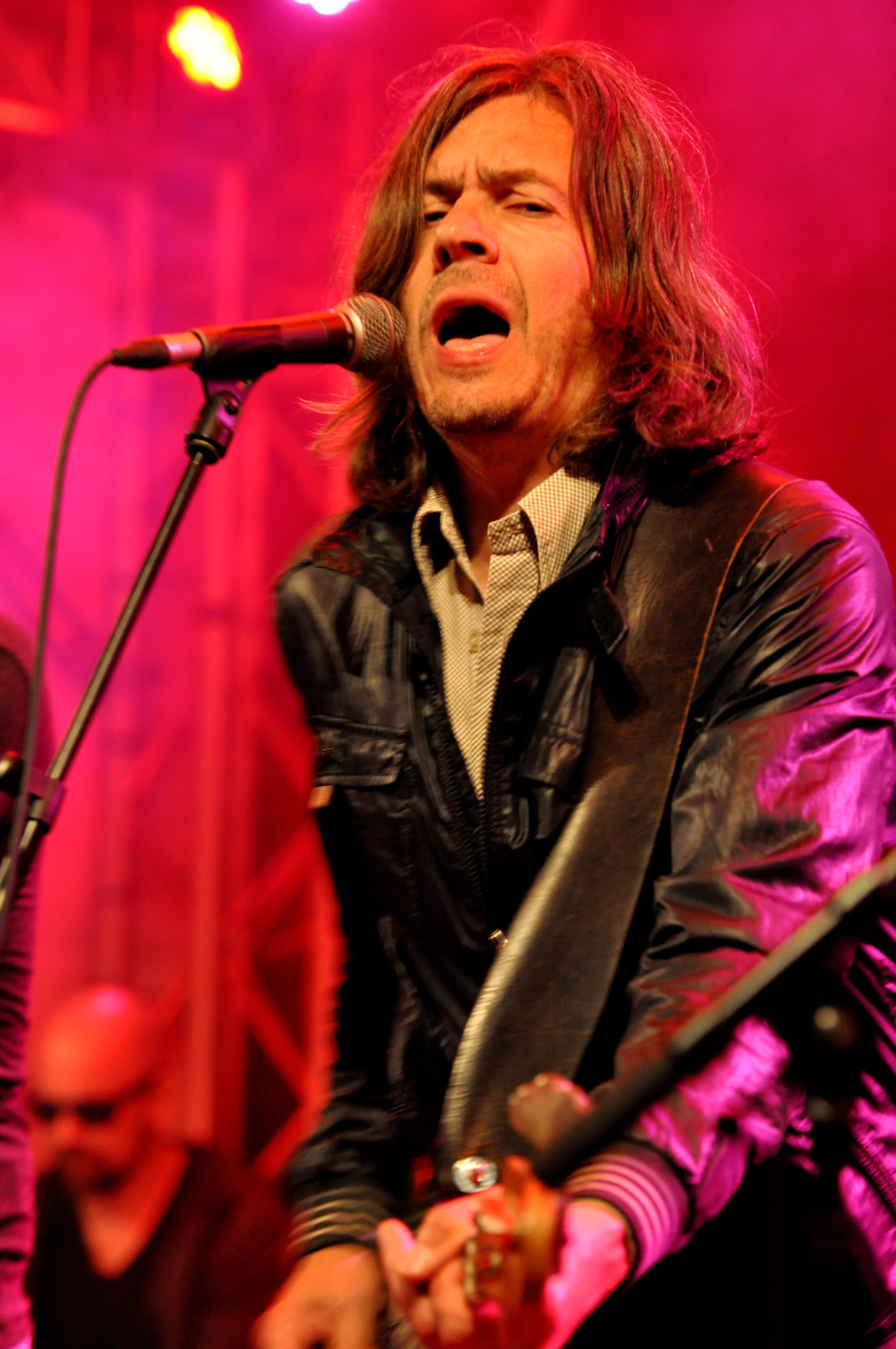
Dirk Blümlein

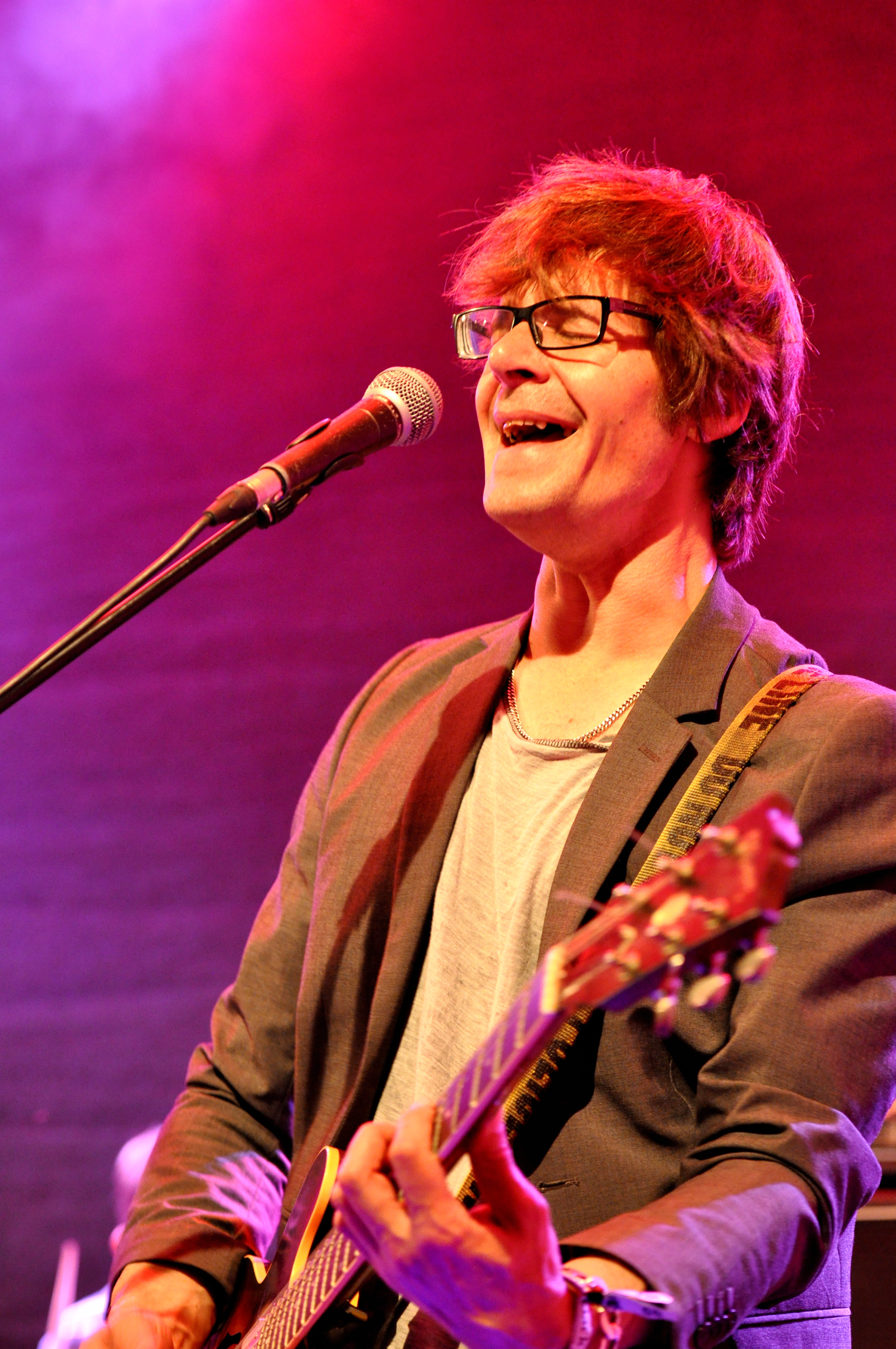
Gabriel Holz

=== Current members ===
- Peter Freudenthaler — lead and backing vocals, keyboards, composer (1991—present)
- Volker Hinkel — guitar, keyboards, lead and backing vocals, composer (1991—present)
- Dirk Blümlein — bass guitar, backing vocals (2003—present)
- Gabriel Holz — guitar, backing vocals, composer (2003—2007; 2014—present)
- Thorsten Kiefer — keyboards (2015—present)
- Jan Hees — drums, percussion (2015—present)

=== Former members ===
- Claus-Dieter Wissler — composer (1991—1995)
- Thomas Mangold — bass guitar, backing vocals (1991—2003)
- Ralf Wochele — drums, percussion, backing vocals (1991—2003)
- Roland Röhl — keyboards, backing vocals (1991—2003)
- Claus Müller — drums, percussion, backing vocals (2003—2014)

== Discography ==
=== Studio albums ===
- Fool's Garden (1991)
- Once in a Blue Moon (1993)
- Dish of the Day (1995)
- Go and Ask Peggy for the Principal Thing (1997)
- For Sale (2000)
- 25 Miles to Kissimmee (2003)
- Ready for the Real Life (2005)
- Who Is Jo King? (2012)
- Flashback (2015)
- Rise and Fall (2018)
- Captain... Coast Is Clear (2021)

=== Live albums ===
- Best of Unplugged – Live (2009)

=== Compilation albums ===
- High Times – The Best of Fools Garden (2009)
- The Lost Tapes Vol. 1 (2018)

=== EPs ===
- Home (2008)
- Lemon Tree (2024)

== Awards and nominations ==
Year	Work	Awards	Category	Result
1995	Themselves	RSH Gold		
1996	Themselves	Bambi Award	Most Successful Young Band	Won
1996	Themselves	Goldene Stimmgabel		
1996	Themselves	Goldene Europa	National Newcomer of the Year	Won
1996	Themselves	COMET		
1996	"Lemon Tree"	Hit Radio Award Hong Kong	Song of the Year	Won
1996	"Lemon Tree"	YMC- TV Channel Hong Kong	Supreme Gold Song of the Year	Won
1996	Themselves	YMC- TV Channel Hong Kong	International Newcomer of the Year	Won
1996	Themselves	Radio Regenbogen Award		
1997	Themselves	ECHO Awards	Newcomer of the Year	Won
1997	Themselves	ECHO Awards	Most Successful National Group	Nominated
1997	Themselves	ECHO Awards	Best National Young Talent	Nominated
1997	"Lemon Tree"	ECHO Awards	Most Successful National Rock/Pop Single of the Year	Nominated
1997	"Lemon Tree"	ECHO Awards	Best National Videoclip of the Year	Nominated
2005	Themselves	Ravensburger Kupferle	Mixed Doubles	Won
2009	"Lemon Tree"	RTHK International Pop Poll Awards	Top 20th Anniversary Gold Song	Nominated
