= For Sale (Fool's Garden album) =

Studio album by Fool's Garden
- Released: 28 November 2000
- Genre: Alternative rock; indie rock
- Label: BMG
- Producer: Ulrich Herter and Volker Hinkel

Fool's Garden chronology
Go and Ask Peggy for the Principal Thing (1997)	For Sale (2000)	25 Miles to Kissimmee (2003)

Singles from For Sale
- 1. "Suzy" Released: 2000; 2. "It Can Happen" Released: 2000; 3. "Happy" Released: 2000; 4. "In The Name" Released: 2001

Professional ratings
Review scores
Source	Rating
AllMusic	2.0/5 stars

For Sale is the fifth album by German pop band Fool's Garden, released in 2000.

== Track listing ==
All tracks written and composed by Peter Freudenthaler and Volker Hinkel

1. "Who Are You?"
2. "Allright"
3. "Suzy"
4. "Missing"
5. "Save Me"
6. "She's So Happy to Be"
7. "It Can Happen"
8. "Interlude"
9. "In the Name"
10. "Still"
11. "Pure"
12. "Monday Morning Girl"
13. "Noone's Song"
14. "Happy"

Bonus track on the Japanese edition and European limited edition

15. "Today"
  - B-side to "It Can Happen" single

Additional bonus track on the European limited edition

16. "Suzy (Rehearsal Tape)"
  - B-side to "Suzy" single

== Personnel ==
- Peter Freudenthaler – vocals
- Volker Hinkel – lead vocals on "Pure", co-lead vocals on "Noone's Song", guitars, programming, additional keyboards and backing vocals
- Roland Röhl – keyboards
- Thomas Mangold – bass
- Ralf Wochele – drums
- Ulrich Herter – programming and additional keyboards

== Charts ==
=== Weekly charts ===
Weekly chart performance for For Sale
Chart (1995–1996)	Peak position
German Albums (Offizielle Top 100)	84

Weekly chart performance for "Suzy"
Chart (2000)	Peak position
Germany (GfK)	75

=== Year-end charts ===
Year-end chart rankings for "Suzy"
Chart (2001)	Position
European Radio (Border Breakers)	100
