= Fool's Garden (album) =

Studio album by Fool's Garden
- Released: 1991
- Recorded: June 1990 – August 1991
- Genre: Alternative rock, pop rock, indie pop
- Length: 50:21
- Producer: Claudia & Gunter Koch

Fool's Garden chronology
Fool's Garden (1991)	Once in a Blue Moon (1993)

Singles from Fool's Garden
- 1. "Tell Me Who I Am / Careless Games" Released: 1991

Fool's Garden is the first studio album by the rock band Fool's Garden. It was released in 1991. The album is one of two records where singer Peter Freudenthaler and guitarist Volker Hinkel share lead vocals equally. The album is dedicated to John Winston Lennon.

== Track listing ==
Music & lyrics by Volker Hinkel, otherwise stated.

Fool's Garden track listing
No.	Title	Length
1.	"Awakenings"	4:34
2.	"Man in a Cage" (by Hinkel, Claus-Dieter Wissler)	3:42
3.	"Scared"	1:24
4.	"Careless Games"	3:58
5.	"Sandy" (by Peter Freudenthaler)	5:49
6.	"One Way Out" (music by Hinkel; lyrics by Hinkel & Wissler)	6:34
7.	"Cry Baby Cry" (by Lennon, McCartney)	2:29
8.	"Spirit of the Disappeared" (by Hinkel, Wissler)	4:22
9.	"Lena" (music by Hinkel; lyrics by Freudenthaler)	4:50
10.	"No Flowers by Request"	2:24
11.	"Tell Me Who I Am" (by Freudenthaler)	3:09
12.	"The Part of the Fool"	4:23
13.	"You're Not Forgotten"	2:43
Total length:		54:21

=== Singles ===
1. "Tell Me Who I Am / Careless Games" (double A-sided single released in 1991)

== Musicians ==
- Volker Hinkel: guitars, keyboards, vocals, harmonica, additional drums, bass on tracks 2, 4 & 11, accordion on track 4, strings arrangement on track 7.
- Peter Freudenthaler: vocals and keyboards on tracks 5, 9 & 11, backing vocals on tracks 2 & 4.
- Bernhard Gail: solo guitar on tracks 9 & 12; backing vocals on track 4.
- Thomas Feucht: bass on track 1, 10 & 12.
- Ralf Gehring: acc. guitar on track 10.
- Andy Gail: mandolin on track 4.
- Nicole Freudenthaler: backing vocals on track 13.
- Roland Acht: drums.
