= Lemon Tree (Fool's Garden song) =

1995 single by Fool's Garden

Single by Fool's Garden

from the album Dish of the Day
- Released: 3 November 1995
- Genre: Britpop; bubblegum pop
- Length: 3:11
- Label: Intercord; Encore
- Songwriters: Peter Freudenthaler; Volker Hinkel
- Producers: Peter Freudenthaler; Volker Hinkel; Bernd Hasebrink; Thomas Mangold; Roland Röhl; Ralf Wochele

Fool's Garden singles chronology
"Wild Days" (1994)	"Lemon Tree" (1995)	"Wild Days" (1996)

Music video
- "Lemon Tree" on YouTube

"Lemon Tree" is a song by German band Fool's Garden from their third album, Dish of the Day (1995). The band's lead vocalist, Peter Freudenthaler, said that he wrote the song on a Sunday afternoon when he was waiting for his girlfriend who did not come. It was released as a single in November 1995 by Intercord and Encore Records and became an international hit the following year, remaining at number one for four weeks in Germany and also topping the charts of Austria, Iceland, Ireland, Norway, and Sweden. In the United Kingdom, the song reached number 26 on the UK Singles Chart. The band recorded a new version of the song for the 2009 compilation album High Times – The Best of Fools Garden.

== Critical reception ==
Pan-European magazine Music & Media wrote, "This song by the eclectic German quintet has reached number 10 in the GSA Major Market Airplay chart and with good reason. The track is a cross between a catchy circus tune and late '60s bubblegum pop with trademark harmonies, which should appeal to the broadest of radio audiences."

== Track listings ==
- European CD single
1. "Lemon Tree" – 3:11
2. "Finally" – 4:29
- European maxi-CD single and UK CD single
1. "Lemon Tree" – 3:11 (3:10 on UK release)
2. "Finally" – 4:29 (4:30 on UK release)
3. "Spirit '91" (dance-mix) – 4:11 (4:13 on UK release)
- US and Canadian CD single
1. "Lemon Tree"
2. "Take Me"
- Australian and New Zealand CD single
1. "Lemon Tree" – 3:11
2. "Take Me" – 4:20
3. "Spirit '91" – 4:11
- South African maxi-CD single
1. "Lemon Dance" (single edit) – 3:52
2. "Lemon Tree" (club mix) – 6:16

== Personnel ==
- All songs written by Peter Freudenthaler and Volker Hinkel
- Vocals: Peter Freudenthaler
- Bass: Thomas Mangold
- Drums: Ralf Wochele
- Guitar: Volker Hinkel
- Keyboards: Roland Röhl
- Breaking lamp sound: Jorick Bouw
- Artwork: Müller & Steeneck Stuttgart
- Bicchieri: Mattia Tugnoli
- Immersive Mixing Engineer, Immersive Mastering Engineer: Brad Smalling

== Charts ==
=== Weekly charts ===
Chart (1996–1997)	Peak position
Australia (ARIA)	31
Austria (Ö3 Austria Top 40)	1
Belgium (Ultratop 50 Flanders)	2
Belgium (Ultratop 50 Wallonia)	2
Canada (Nielsen SoundScan)	10
Croatia (HR Top 40)	2
Czech Republic (IFPI CR)	7
Denmark (IFPI)	2
Europe (Eurochart Hot 100)	4
Finland (Suomen virallinen lista)	11
France (SNEP)	3
Germany (GfK)	1
Hungary (Mahasz)	4
Iceland (Íslenski Listinn Topp 40)	1
Ireland (IRMA)	1
Israel (Israeli Singles Chart)	5
Italy (Musica e dischi)	5
Italy Airplay (Music & Media)	2
Netherlands (Dutch Top 40)	10
Netherlands (Single Top 100)	12
New Zealand (Recorded Music NZ)	14
Norway (VG-lista)	1
Poland Airplay (Music & Media)	3
Scottish Singles Sales (Official Charts)	25
Sweden (Sverigetopplistan)	1
Switzerland (Schweizer Hitparade)	2
Taiwan (IFPI)	1
UK Singles (Official Charts)	26
US Bubbling Under Hot 100 Singles (Billboard)	13

Chart (2019)	Peak position
Slovenia (SloTop50)	44

Chart (2024)	Peak position
Poland (Polish Airplay Top 100)	59

=== Year-end charts ===
Chart (1996)	Position
Austria (Ö3 Austria Top 40)	9
Belgium (Ultratop 50 Flanders)	13
Belgium (Ultratop 50 Wallonia)	18
Europe (Eurochart Hot 100)	7
Europe (European Hit Radio)	5
France (SNEP)	8
Germany (Media Control)	5
Iceland (Íslenski Listinn Topp 40)	4
Israel (Israeli Singles Chart)	28
Netherlands (Dutch Top 40)	49
Netherlands (Single Top 100)	65
Norway (VG-lista)	6
Sweden (Topplistan)	7
Switzerland (Schweizer Hitparade)	4

== Certifications ==
Region	Certification	Certified units/sales
Austria (IFPI Austria)	Gold	25,000^{*}
Belgium (BRMA)	Gold	25,000^{*}
France (SNEP)	Gold	250,000^{*}
France (SNEP)	Gold	100,000^{‡}
Germany (BVMI)	Platinum	500,000^{^}
Italy (FIMI) sales since 2009	Platinum	70,000^{‡}
New Zealand (RMNZ)	Platinum	10,000^{*}
Norway (IFPI Norway)	Platinum	
Sweden (GLF)	Gold	25,000^{^}
Switzerland (IFPI Switzerland)	Platinum	50,000^{^}
^{*} Sales figures based on certification alone.^{^} Shipments figures based on certification alone.^{‡} Sales+streaming figures based on certification alone.

== Release history ==
Region	Date	Format(s)	Label(s)	Ref.
Europe	3 November 1995	CD	Intercord; Encore	
United Kingdom	13 May 1996	CD; cassette	Encore	
United States	27 May 1997	Contemporary hit radio	Universal	

== Covers and parodies ==
Dustin the Turkey recorded a Christmas-parody called "Christmas Tree". Taiwanese singer Tarcy Su released covers of the song (in both Mandarin and Cantonese) as did Korean singer Park Hye Kyung. Taiwanese-American singer-songwriter Joanna Wang made a cover of the song in 2011. Korean singer and composer, Hongjoong of the group Ateez, released a cover of the song on 4 May 2022.

=== Alle Farben and Fool's Garden version ===
"Lemon Tree"

Single by Alle Farben and Fool's Garden
- Released: 8 January 2021
- Length: 3:15
- Songwriters: Peter Freudenthaler; Volker Hinkel
- Producers: Frans Zimmer; Junkx

On 8 January 2021, Alle Farben with Fool's Garden released a cover of "Lemon Tree".

==== Personnel ====
From Tidal:

- Lyricist and composer: Peter Freudenthaler and Volker Hinkel
- Producer: Frans Zimmer and Junkx
- Mastering Engineer: Dirk Duderstadt and Marco Duderstadt
- Mixing: Junkx

==== Charts ====
===== Weekly charts =====
Chart (2021)	Peak position
Germany (GfK)	92
Hungary (Dance Top 40)	3
Hungary (Rádiós Top 40)	24
Poland Airplay (ZPAV)	32

=== Year-end charts ===
Chart (2021)	Position
Hungary (Dance Top 40)	11

Chart (2022)	Position
Hungary (Dance Top 40)	43
