= Go and Ask Peggy for the Principal Thing =

Studio album by Fool's Garden
- Released: 1997
- Recorded: January–June 1997
- Genre: Britpop, alternative rock, pop rock
- Label: Intercord
- Producer: Volker Hinkel and Fool's Garden

Fool's Garden chronology
Dish of the Day (1995)	Go and Ask Peggy for the Principal Thing (1997)	For Sale (2000)

Singles from Go and Ask Peggy for the Principal Thing
- 1. "Why Did She Go?" Released: 1997; 2. "Probably" Released: 1997; 3. "Rainy Day" Released: 1998

Go and Ask Peggy for the Principal Thing is the fourth album by German rock band Fool's Garden, released in 1997.

== Track listing ==
All songs written by Volker Hinkel and Peter Freudenthaler except where noted

1. "The Principal Thing"
2. "Emily"
3. "Why Did She Go?"
4. "Why Am I Sad Today"
5. "Martha My Dear" (Lennon–McCartney)
6. "And You Say"
7. "Probably"
8. "Nothing"
9. "When The Moon Kisses Town" (Hinkel, Freudenthaler, Roland Röhl)
10. "Rainy Day"
11. "Northern Town"
12. "Good Night"
13. "Probably" (reprise) – hidden track

== Personnel ==
- Peter Freudenthaler – vocals
- Volker Hinkel – guitars, mandolin, blues harp, keyboards and backing vocals
- Roland Röhl – keyboards, accordion and backing vocals
- Thomas Mangold – bass, double bass and backing vocals
- Ralf Wochele – drums and backing vocals
- Oliver Frager – trumpet and French horn
- Bob Perry – trombone and tuba
- Gitte Haus – backing vocals
- Jette Schniering – cello
- Oliver Maguire – weather forecast on "Rainy Day"

== Charts ==
=== Weekly charts ===
Chart (1995–1996)	Peak position
German Albums (Offizielle Top 100)	44
Swiss Albums (Schweizer Hitparade)	50
