= Dish of the Day (album) =

Studio album by Fool's Garden
- Released: February 1995
- Recorded: 1994
- Genre: Pop rock; indie pop; baroque pop
- Length: 45:47
- Label: Intercord
- Producer: Volker Hinkel, Bernd Hasebrink and Fool's Garden

Fool's Garden chronology
Once in a Blue Moon (1993)	Dish of the Day (1995)	Go and Ask Peggy for the Principal Thing (1997)

Singles from Dish of the Day
- 1. "Wild Days" Released: 1994; 2. "Lemon Tree" Released: 1995; 3. "Wild Days (re-release)" Released: 1996; 4. "Pieces" Released: 1996

Dish of the Day is the third album by the German rock band Fool's Garden released in 1995. The album features the band's most known song - the international hit "Lemon Tree".

== Track listing ==
All lyrics written by Peter Freudenthaler and Volker Hinkel, except "Finally" by Hinkel and Claus-Dieter Wissler.

No.	Title	Music	Length
1.	"Ordinary Man"	Freudenthaler, Hinkel	3:30
2.	"Meanwhile"	Freudenthaler, Hinkel	4:41
3.	"Lemon Tree"	Freudenthaler, Hinkel	3:11
4.	"Pieces"	Freudenthaler, Hinkel	3:55
5.	"Take Me"	Freudenthaler, Hinkel, Röhl, Mangold, Wochele	4:17
6.	"Wild Days"	Freudenthaler, Hinkel	3:46
7.	"The Seal"	Freudenthaler, Hinkel	4:22
8.	"Autumn"	Freudenthaler, Hinkel	3:43
9.	"The Tocsin"	Freudenthaler, Hinkel, Röhl	2:50
10.	"Finally"	Hinkel	4:30
11.	"One Fine Day"	Freudenthaler, Hinkel	7:02

== Musicians ==
- Peter Freudenthaler - vocals
- Volker Hinkel - guitars, backing vocals, programming
- Roland Röhl - keyboards
- Thomas Mangold - bass
- Rafl Wochele - drums, backing vocals
- Gitte Haus, Tina Müller, Julia Noch and Karin Buck (formerly known as Karin Rossow) - backing vocals

== Charts ==
=== Weekly charts ===
Chart (1995–1996)	Peak position
Austrian Albums (Ö3 Austria)	4
Belgian Albums (Ultratop Wallonia)	28
Dutch Albums (Album Top 100)	30
Finnish Albums (Suomen virallinen lista)	21
French Albums (SNEP)	17
German Albums (Offizielle Top 100)	1
Hungarian Albums (MAHASZ)	13
Norwegian Albums (VG-lista)	19
Swedish Albums (Sverigetopplistan)	22
Swiss Albums (Schweizer Hitparade)	3

=== Year-end charts ===
Chart (1996)	Position
Austrian Albums (Ö3 Austria)	29
German Albums (Offizielle Top 100)	13
Swiss Albums (Schweizer Hitparade)	8

== Certifications ==
Region	Certification	Certified units/sales
Austria (IFPI Austria)	Gold	25,000^{*}
Germany (BVMI)	Platinum	500,000^{^}
Malaysia	2× Platinum	50,000
Singapore (RIAS)	Platinum	15,000^{*}
Switzerland (IFPI Switzerland)	Platinum	50,000^{^}
Taiwan (RIT)	Platinum	50,000^{*}
Thailand	Gold	25,000
^{*} Sales figures based on certification alone.^{^} Shipments figures based on certification alone.
