= Chas (newspaper) =

Latvian newspaper

- Publisher: Petits
- Editor-in-chief: Pavel Kirillov
- Founded: 1997
- Ceased publication: December 7, 2012
- Language: Russian
- Headquarters: Riga
- Website: http://www.chas-daily.com

Chas (Time, Russian: Час) was a daily newspaper published in Latvia, the third among Russian language dailies and the eighth among all dailies by subscription, as of January 2010. In 2012 the paper merged with Vesti segodnya. The final issue appeared on December 7, 2012.
