= 25 Miles to Kissimmee =

Studio album by Fool's Garden
- Released: 17 January 2003
- Genre: Alternative rock; indie rock
- Label: Polydor

Fool's Garden chronology
For Sale (2000)	25 Miles to Kissimmee (2003)	Ready for the Real Life (2005)

Singles from 25 Miles to Kissimmee
- 1. "Dreaming" Released: 2001; 2. "Closer" Released: 2002

25 Miles to Kissimmee is the sixth studio album by German pop band Fool's Garden, released in 2003. It is also the last album featuring all of the original members of the band.

== Overview ==
The title track is about a girl who attempts to seduce her married passenger while she is driving them 25 miles (40 km) into a city for unspecified reasons.

The song "Dreaming", originally released as a single in 2001, was re-recorded in 2004 for a new single release. The new version was later included as a bonus track on the band's seventh album Ready for the Real Life.

A new version of "Reason", titled "Reason 2.0", appears on the band's EP Home, with new arrangements and different verses, but with an identical chorus.

== Track listing ==
All songs written by Volker Hinkel and Peter Freudenthaler

1. "Closer"
2. "Tears Run Dry"
3. "Dreaming" (original version)
4. "Bighouse Pyromaniac"
5. "Bighouse" (reprise)
6. "Material World"
7. "Reason"
8. "Glory"
9. "25 Miles to Kissimmee"
10. "Silence"
11. "I Won't Kill Myself"
12. "Ismael"
13. "Rolling Home"
14. "Closer" (2001 version) – bonus track

== Musicians ==
- Peter Freudenthaler – vocals
- Volker Hinkel – guitars, programming, backing vocals
- Roland Röhl – keyboards
- Thomas Mangold – bass
- Ralf Wochele – drums
- Hellmut Hattler – bass on "Tears Run Dry", "Material World" and "I Won't Kill Myself"
- Jochen Schmalbach – drums and programming on "Tears Run Dry", "Material World" and "25 Miles to Kissimmee"
