= Peter Freudenthaler =

German rock singer and songwriter

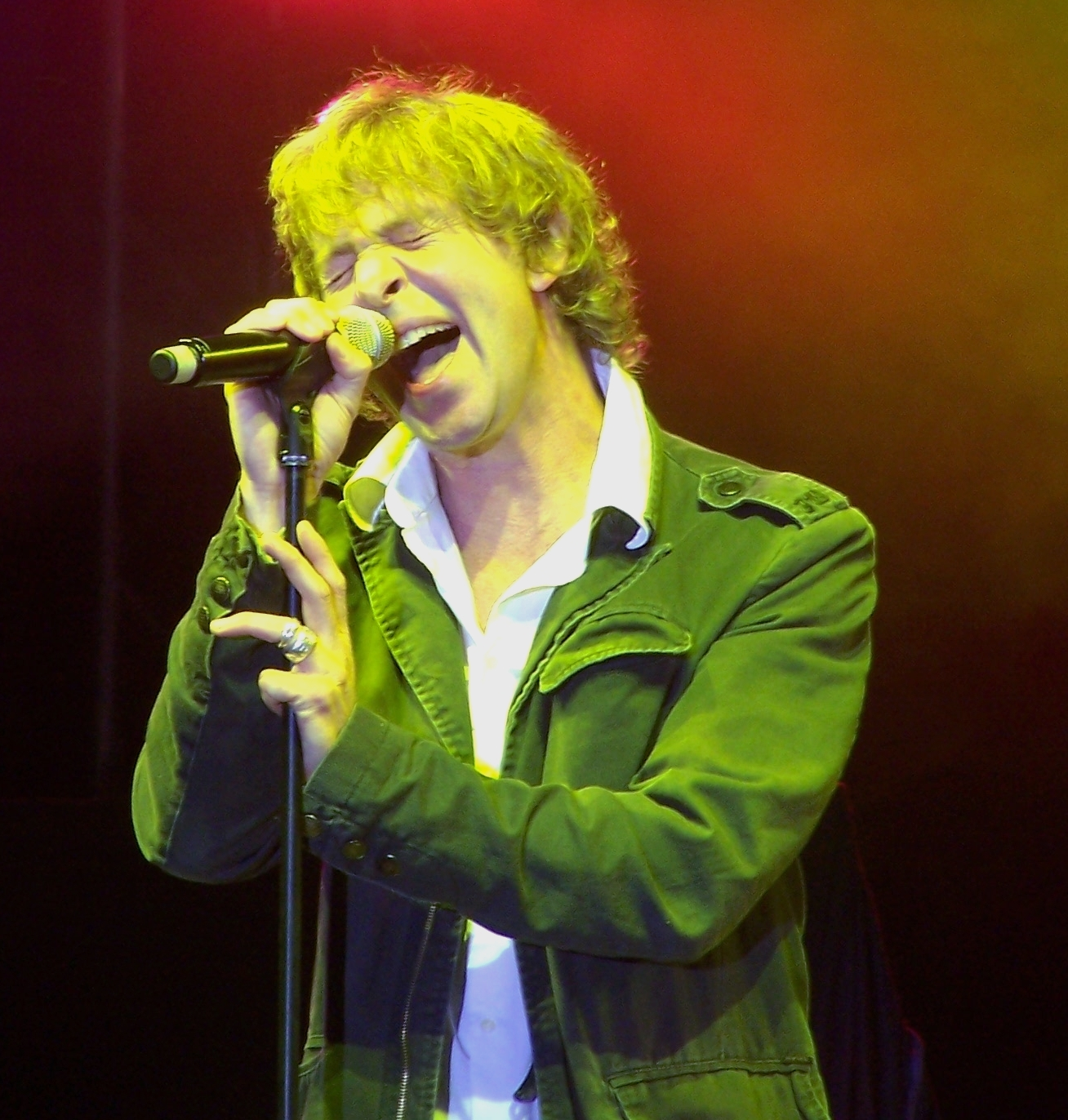
- Freudenthaler performing in 2008
- Born: 19 February 1963 (age 63); Pforzheim, West Germany
- Occupations: Singer; songwriter; musician
- Musical career
- Genres: Britpop; pop rock; rock and roll; alternative rock; bubblegum pop
- Instruments: Vocals; keyboards
- Years active: 1976–present

Peter Freudenthaler (born 19 February 1963) is a German rock musician, singer and songwriter best known as the lead vocalist and one of the founding members of the pop rock band Fool's Garden. He is the author of the song "Lemon Tree", which made the band, and him in particular, famous worldwide. In addition to participating in Fool's Garden, Freudenthaler has also collaborated with other music artists.

Peter Freudenthaler graduated from the Hebel Gymnasium high school in Pforzheim and later in 1990 entered the Stuttgart Media University, where he became acquainted with Volker Hinkel, who invited him into his music project Magazine. In 1991, Magazine was renamed Fool's Garden.

In 2012, Alexander Rusakov, in his book "Who is Who, or MUZPROSVET in Global Contemporary Popular Music", put Peter Freudenthaler on No. 792 in the rating of 1000 best musicians of global contemporary popular music for his participation in Fool's Garden. In 2017, Peter received the Portus Medal for Merit to Pforzheim from the city's mayor Gert Hager.

== Biography ==
=== Early life and beginnings of musical career ===
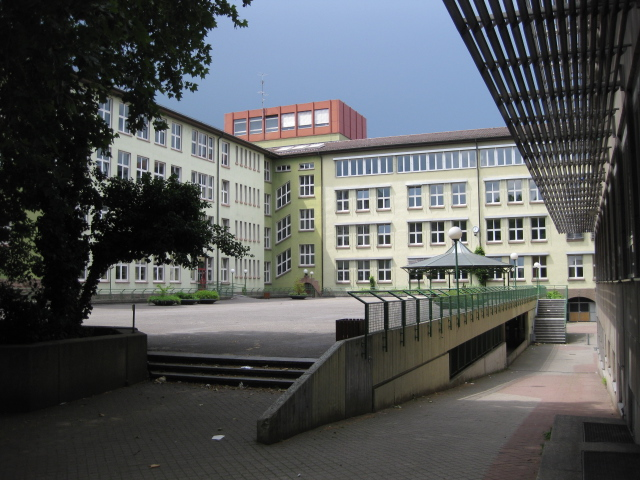
Hebel Gymnasium Pforzheim is the high school where Peter Freudenthaler studied.

Peter was born on 19 February 1963, in the small German town of Pforzheim in Baden-Württemberg. Freudenthaler's family was religious, and from an early age he professed Protestantism. Also, his family was closely connected with music: his great-grandfather was a conductor and choirmaster. At the age of four, Peter became an admirer of Heintje Simons and was eager to become a singer. At the age of seven, he began to study the piano, his parents paid for his lessons even in spite of financial problems. Peter also had an uncle in Dresden, and as a child he periodically traveled with his family to the German Democratic Republic to visit him.

In 1974, Freudenthaler was impressed with the FIFA World Cup held in Germany. He also had a desire to play football, but soon realized that he lacked skills. Two years later, Peter attended a Status Quo concert in Sindelfingen. The performance inspired Freudenthaler to create his own group. At the age of fifteen, he founded his first band Election, which performed cover versions of famous songs. At that time, Peter was not yet a vocalist, in Election he only played keyboards. Demian, the second band in which Freudenthaler took part, already performed their own songs. In 1983, Demian took part in a music group competition, finishing at No. 8. In the same year, Peter founded his third band, The Stitch. Due to financial difficulties, he had to work a lot: in a charity center and as a forklift driver. In 1985 he graduated as a carpenter, and from 1986 to 1989 he studied to be a piano tuner.

Already with The Stitch, Freudenthaler began writing his own songs: "Sandy" and "Tell Me Who I Am". Soon, due to disagreements in the band, The Stitch broke up. In 1990, Peter entered the University of Stuttgart to study multimedia technology to create his own video clips. The following year, he met Volker Hinkel, who entered his second year of study. Hinkel, as well as Freudenthaler, was engaged in music creation and had his own project Magazine. After listening to each other's recordings, both musicians decided to continue their creative path together, and after a while Hinkel invited Freudenthaler to Magazine.

We discovered that we both have a great passion for music and that we have lived only three kilometers apart geographically since childhood. We started to write songs together and quickly realized that it worked really well. So it really had to be some kind of fateful encounter, because the interaction with no one else worked that well before.

— Peter Freudenthaler on acquaintance with Volker Hinkel.

Peter was impressed by the high quality of Volker's demos, so with his help the two re-recorded "Sandy" and "Tell Me Who I Am". After a while, Hinkel and Freudenthaler came across an advertisement in the newspaper, which offered to record an album for 130 DM. This is how Magazine was recorded. This limited edition album was the precursor for the promo album Fool's Garden – Man in a Cage (simply abbreviated as Fool's Garden) released in 1991. In honor of the new album, Magazine was renamed Fool's Garden.

=== Participation in Fool's Garden ===
From 1991 to the present, Peter Freudenthaler has participated in the recording and release of 9 Fool's Garden studio albums. Musical activity as part of this band made Peter famous all over the world. This was due to the release of a single with the song "Lemon Tree", written by Freudenthaler in 1995. According to the author, the plot of the song was based on true events, and he composed the song when he was waiting for his girlfriend. The song became a major hit, topped music charts around the world, was broadcast by radio stations and sold in large numbers. In the magazine Novyi Ochevidets, the song "Lemon Tree" was named the main German hit of the 90s.

— By the way, Peter, how was "Lemon Tree" written? You must have been sitting on a lemon tree...
— No, you will not believe it, but I was sitting in my little room in my hometown, there was a piano in the bedroom, it was another Sunday afternoon, it was raining, I was waiting for my girlfriend, but she still didn’t come...
— You are now quoting the first verse.
— And it was all true. To pass the time, I started tinkling on the piano and humming "I wonder how I wonder why..." And after 15–20 minutes the song was composed by itself.
— The girl came then?
— Nope...

— dialogue between journalists from Chas newspaper and Peter Freudenthaler (1998).

In December 1995, Freudenthaler's first daughter was born. On the day of her birth, the band's fans came to the musician's house and sang the song "Lemon Tree" under his window.

The song "Lemon Tree" became a hit shortly before the start of the final exams at the University of Stuttgart. To fully devote time to music, Freudenthaler had to drop out of the university. Although, according to his words, already from the second semester of education, his studies faded into the background, since even then he began to dedicate most of his time to playing in a group. The income from his musical activity was sufficient so that in 1996 Peter could quit his regular job and become a professional musician. In one of his interviews Peter told that one of the first purchases with the money received from the sales of Dish of the Day and "Lemon Tree" was a Mercedes-Benz W210 for 50,000 DM. The Zweites Deutsches Fernsehen TV channel claims that Freudenthaler receives 50,000 euros annually in royalties.

Following the commercial success of "Lemon Tree" and Dish of the Day, Peter Freudenthaler embarked on a worldwide concert tour with Fool's Garden, playing over 100 shows around the world. However, the band could not repeat the success of their only hit. In an interview for the Bild newspaper, the musician admitted that he was "almost happy" that Fool's Garden did not achieve repeated success, as he had to spend a very long time on tours away from his family. According to him, this allowed him to concentrate on the really important things, for example, he was able to see how his children grew up.

=== Activities outside Fool's Garden ===
In 2003, Freudenthaler recorded backing vocals for the song "74 Minutes" by the German synth-pop band Camouflage, which was released on the album Sensor. Volker Hinkel also contributed guitar parts to the other two songs on the album.

Peter Freudenthaler on cooperation with Edipov Kompleks

I didn't know the guys were going to play my songs "Lemon Tree" and "Probably". I thought we would only sing two songs of Edipov Kompleks together. It was an amazing surprise. It felt like my guitarist was playing along with me.

— from an interview for Russkoye Radio

In 2006, in Moscow, Peter Freudenthaler became a special guest at the presentation of the album Lost & Found by the Russian rock group Edipov Kompleks (Russian: Эдипов Комплекс, in English: Oedipus Complex). He also took part in the recording of the songs "All That I Can See" and "Smile" from this album. Also at the presentation, Peter and Edipov Kompleks performed Fool's Garden songs "Lemon Tree" and "Probably". Also in 2006, Freudenthaler recorded vocals for the song "Didgeridoo" from the album The Big Flow of German musician Helmut Hattler. Freudenthaler met Hattler in 1995 at a concert, and Hattler had also participated in recording bass guitar parts for songs from the album 25 Miles to Kissimmee.

In 2015, Peter took part in the charity bike race Lila Logistik Charity Bike Cup, the funds from which were sent to the treatment of disabled children, as well as to support children from socially disadvantaged groups.

In 2016, Freudenthaler participated in the international expert jury in the Lithuanian national selection for the 2016 Eurovision Song Contest. The following year, Peter Freudenthaler was invited to take part in the recording of the song "Goldstadtsong" dedicated to his hometown of Pforzheim, as well as in the filming of a video clip for this song.

In 2018, the musician took part in the recording of the sixteenth studio album Zwischen den Welten of the German pop rock band Pur. It had stayed for 34 weeks on the German Albums Chart, reaching No. 2, and also charted in Austria and Switzerland. In October, Peter was invited to the Smash Hits music show dedicated to Germany's most famous music performers in the 1990s, as a member of Fool's Garden. In December of the same year, Freudenthaler was included in the jury of the best Christmas song of 2018 competition organized by SWR1. Also on 5 December, the International Volunteer Day for Economic and Social Development, Peter Freudenthaler took over the leadership of a major charity event in Stuttgart.

On 23 March 2019, Freudenthaler, together with Harry Klenck, the vocalist and guitarist of the German band You, performed in Knittlingen. The duo presented both the songs of Fool's Garden and You, as well as other famous songs of various performers over the past 40 years. In the same year, the musician once again took part in the Lila Logistik Charity Bike Cup. In the summer of 2019, Peter participated in writing the lyrics for the new album of the Georgian-German singer Natia Todua, and also recorded backing vocals for the album Aus Der Zeit Gefallen of the German singer Stefan Waggershausen. In November Freudenthaler took part in the "Udopium Orchester" concert in Lauda-Königshofen with such German performers as Johanna Stevens Schwarzwald, Anke Dinkel and Danny McCoy. In the same year, Peter performed at a concert in memory of Edo Zanki, who is called "the godfather of German soul". Two years earlier, the singer took part in the recording of his album Playing For Hope.

Also in April 2019, Peter Freudenthaler was invited in the filming of a short documentary about spinal diseases and the thematical discussion at the Congress Centrum Pforzheim in front of 400 listeners. Eight years earlier, the musician himself had suffered a herniated disc, but thanks to proper physical therapy and prolonged exercise, the problem was brought under control.

On 10 April 2020, the musician was invited to the musical TV program "NTV's Homestead at Margulis" (Russian: Квартирник НТВ у Маргулиса) together with the Russian rock group Zodchie (Russian: Зодчие, in English: Architects). Freudenthaler sang the song "Lemon Tree", and the frontman of Zodchie Yuri Davydov shared with the audience the story of his acquaintance with Freudenthaler. On 26 April, Peter took part in the "THANKS TO DOCTORS" marathon organized by the Komsomolskaya Pravda radio with the invitation of many Russian and foreign popular performers. The marathon was held as a support and expression of gratitude to doctors fighting the COVID-19 pandemic.

== Family and personal life ==
Peter Freudenthaler has two daughters and a son. At the same time, as of 2005, he was not officially married: in one of the interviews, the musician said that his first daughter was an unplanned child, and, according to him, the obligation to marry after the birth of the child was stupid. Freudenthaler lived in a cohabitation, which suited his partner and their daughters. As of 2018, Peter and his wife are officially married. According to the website InTouch.de, Freudenthaler manages to combine a musical career and family. As an example, the video for the song "Save the World Tomorrow" was filmed right at his house in Pforzheim.

Peter Freudenthaler has dedicated songs to each of his children. In particular, Peter dedicated the song "Nothing" from the album Go and Ask Peggy for the Principal Thing to his youngest daughter, and the song "All We Are" from the album Rise and Fall was dedicated to his son. The musician has also dedicated the song "Water" from the album Who Is Jo King? to his late father.

== Religious and political views ==
I have learned so much in my life, know about chemistry, history, religion, music, but still have the same questions as I had as a child, but often feel further removed from the answers than before. You always have to be flexible, always find other ways and explanatory models. Maybe we don't need any explanatory models at all, but should enjoy life in its beauty and not question everything, but consciously walk through the world. Then you can feel this divine world simply.

— Interview for Hanno Gerwin.

Peter Freudenthaler professes Protestantism, despite the fact that he was brought up in a Catholic town. As a child, the musician was very impressed by the local pastor, attended Catholic events and was even going to convert to Catholicism. According to the singer's words, "there must be something that a person cannot understand rationally". Concerning the church, the musician believes that its existence is of great importance, but the church as an institution often does not reach people and is in many ways difficult for people to feel comfortable in it. Concerning God, Freudenthaler said that for him God is "what surrounds him, which he cannot understand, but which he finds incredibly beautiful". The musician does not support the concept that there is a personified God who lives in Heaven and protects people. He also stated that the conception of God helps children to answer many questions about their origin and life.

In an interview with Jesus.de, Freudenthaler also commented that he always thought it silly when people who do not attend church for an entire year celebrate Christmas and Easter.

Peter Freudenthaler is a supporter of anti-fascism and the "Pforzheim nazifrei" alliance, which prevents the spread of the influence of the ultranationalist party "The Right – Party for Referendum, Sovereignty and Defense of the Homeland" (German: Die Rechte – Partei für Volksabstimmung, Souveränität und Heimatschutz). He took part in a concert against the politics of this party in February 2019 at the Osterfeld House of Culture in Pforzheim. Nevertheless, Freudenthaler is in favor of a democratic dialogue with those who support the political course of "The Right". In his opinion, the main task of the concert in Osterfeld was to draw attention to his "great country".
