= Split Mirrors =

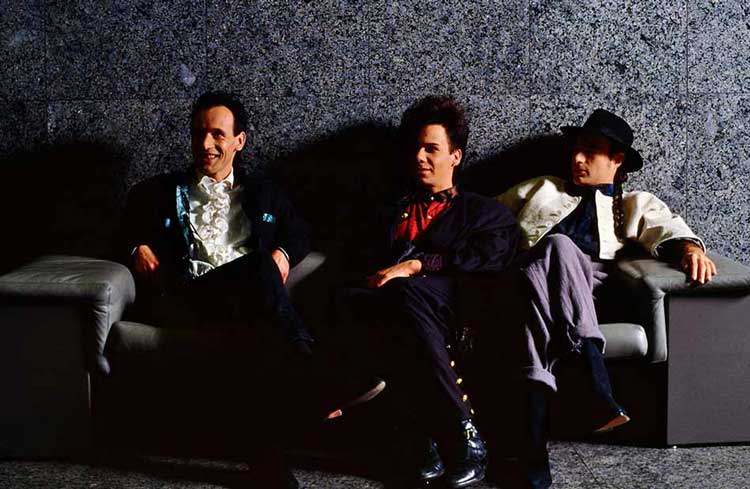

Background information
- Origin: Münster, Germany
- Genres: Synthpop; new wave
- Years active: 1985–present
- Website: www.split-mirrors.com/en

Split Mirrors are a German synth-pop band from Münster in Westphalia, which was founded 1985 and reached international fame with the songs "The Right Time" and "Voices".

== History ==
=== Beginning ===
Achim Jaspert and Andy Cay formed the Split Mirrors in 1985, during a meeting in a rehearsal space in Münster. Jaspert brought drumming experience, which he acquired during his stay in India, while Cay already was a singer in the United States. Peter Delain completed the band as a keyboardist. They wrote their first songs and recorded the following EPs: “The Right Time” (Extended Version) and "Voices" (Extended Version). After debuting their single "The right time" (Let's go crazy mix) they had gigs at home and abroad. In 1993 the album ''1999" was released.

=== Studio and technical equipment ===
They started their own recording studio for work convenience. A sound-proof room allowed recordings of analogue sources like vocals and saxophone. The synthesizers available at that time already had a Midi connection and were used with computers from the Atari-ST series, which had Midi connectors as well. This allowed them to record melodies digitally and edit them afterwards. SMPTE made it possible to connect vocals or other analogue recordings with midi instruments and therefore they could edit and program the digital components. The Atari Falcon contained a DSP chip and offered Hard Disk Recording. This made it possible to edit analogue sounds as well. The revolution of the digital recording techniques made it possible for Split Mirrors to use the same techniques at their studio that you normally only find in professional studios.

=== Collaboration with Münsterians ===
Many artists from the scene in Münster played and recorded their music there, like WestBam, Frank Mertens from Alphaville, Dr. Ring-Ding, Törner Stier, Bawa Abudu, Ulrich Hesselkamp, Doc Heyne and Simon Cay. There were musicians from many different genres like Rock, Reggae, Synthie Pop, German Schlager, Hip-Hop, Rap or Rave. Some of them even participated in songs by Split Mirrors.

=== Work for others ===
Collaborating with other artists became one of their main jobs. They composed, wrote songs or produced songs for artists like Marani, Mike Bauhaus, Andreas Martin and Wolfgang Petry. Those artists sold more than 5 million records and received several gold and platinum awards. They produced songs for the German rock band Audiosmog with former VIVA presenter Tobias Schlegel as guest vocalist. In 2001 they recorded a cover version of "Daylight in Your Eyes" which is originally performed by No Angels. This song went up to number 36 in the Media-Control-Charts. After that, they followed up with the single "When Will I Be Famous (Originally Performed by Bros)" and the album "Top of Rocks" which featured cover versions of famous hits.

=== Remixing their own songs ===
They began doing a series of remixes from some of their older songs. The new versions were released as EPs, e.g. "1999 Freestyle" and "Voices Freestyle". Together new band member Henry Flex on keyboards they recorded an album called "In London" in early 2007, from which they coupled out the EP "Split Mirrors Freestyle". In January 2011, they released the album "From the Beginning". On this Album there are mostly previously unreleased songs from the beginning years in the style of those years. There are also some new songs on the album on which the Chinese singer Fan Jiang participated.

=== Modern remixes ===
Through the implementation of elements from Electro- and Deep house they remixed in collaboration with international DJs from the 1980s synthypop titles like „The Right Time" and „Voices".

Other artists as well wanted the titles in this fresh style like DJ Adam van Hammer and singer Kitsu with the songs "Like Ice in the Sunshine" and "Dolce Vita". Further the band Bad Boys Blue with "You're a Woman" and singer Fancy with "Slice Me Nice".

In December of 2016, DJ Adamski, Henry Flex and Achim Jaspert released Dr. Rave – "It’s Time to Rave – Again". It was the official hymn for the event "90s Rave Berlin" which was held on 11 March 2017. There were artists like Marusha, Kai Tracid, Jam & Spoon, Red 5, DJ Quicksilver, Brooklyn Bounce, Dune, Future Breeze and Da Hool performing at the event.

On 31 March 2017 they released another official re-issue of a cult song from the 1980s. ("HYPNOTIC TANGO" by My Mine 1984). My Mine was an Italian Synthie-Pop-Band with three members. They invented the genre of Italo Disco by releasing the single "Hypnotic Tango", produced by Split Mirrors for DAS ROSS IM RADIO. It was released as R.O.S.S. feat. KITSU & Adam van Hammer.

After that the Split Mirrors produced Adam van Hammer feat. Valerie "Self Control". It was released on 26 May as official re-issue of the cult hit from the 1980s. "Self Control" was an international top ten hit in the version of Laura Branigan as well as in the version of Raffaele Riefoli.

They already finished their work on the next project. Henry Flex and Achim Jaspert : Split Mirrors & Friends. It contains remixes of some of their favorite songs from the 1980s. It's an album with hits from artists they are befriended with like Camouflage, Fancy or Bad Boys Blue. You can find classic hits like "Self Control" on this album as well as "The Great Commandment" performed in the well-known Italo Disco / Discofox sound of the Split Mirrors.

== Discography ==
=== Albums ===
- 1993: 1999
- 2007: In London
- 2011: From The Beginning
- 2017: Split Mirrors and Friends

=== Singles and EPs ===
- 1987: The Right Time (Extended version)
- 1987: Voices (Extended version)
- 1987: The Right Time (Let's go crazy mix)
- 1999: 1999 Maxi (Freestyle)
- 2000: Voices Maxi (Freestyle)

== See also ==
- List of electronic music genres
- Audio engineer
- Sound recording and reproduction
