= Sensor (album) =

Studio album by Camouflage
- Released: 26 May 2003
- Recorded: 1998–2003
- Genre: Synth-pop
- Length: 60:08
- Label: Island
- Producer: Heiko Maile; Rob Kirwan; Toy; Gerret Freirichs

Camouflage chronology
Spice Crackers (1995)	Sensor (2003)	Relocated (2006)

Singles from Sensor
- 1. "Thief" Released: 12 July 1999; 2. "Me and You" Released: 14 April 2003; 3. "I Can't Feel You" Released: 25 August 2003

Professional ratings
Review scores
Source	Rating
laut.de	4/5 stars
Release Magazine	9/10 stars

Sensor is the sixth studio album by German synth-pop trio Camouflage, released on 26 May 2003 by Island Records. It is the band's first album since 1995's Spice Crackers, and the first to feature Oliver Kreyssig since 1989's Methods of Silence. The album charted at number 26 in Germany.

== Background ==
Former band member Oliver Kreyssig had remained in contact with the band following his departure, and through Polydor Music (who had now acquired rights to the band's back catalogue), he began indirectly working with the band on a greatest hits album (Best of Camouflage: We Stroke the Flames) in 1997. He then rejoined the band in 1998, and they began work on their next studio album.

A single, "Thief", was released in July 1999, and it was intended to be the lead single from the new album. However, Virgin indicated that they were not interested in releasing another Camouflage album, resulting in further delays. The band performed a gig in June 2000 in Freiberg, Sweden, their first performance in years.

== Recording ==
Camouflage recruited three different production teams for the recording of Sensor to produce different results for each recording. Rob Kirwan and the band Toy worked on the album in London, while Gerret Freirichs worked from Hamburg. Heiko Maile also worked on the album from his studio in Stuttgart. The producers each sent completed tracks via the Internet and the band's website.

Following additional delays, Camouflage signed with Polydor in February 2002 and continued work on the album. However, Rob Kirwan and Toy retracted from the project late in 2002, causing more delays to the completion of the album. Nevertheless, the album was finally completed in 2003.

== Promotion ==
Two singles came from the record. The first, "Me and You", was released in April 2003 and reached #53 on the German charts. "I Can't Feel You" was issued in August 2003 and charted at #75 in Germany. The third single "Perfect" was cancelled due to the poor chart performances of the other two singles.

== Track listing ==
All songs written by Heiko Maile, Marcus Meyn and Oliver Kreyssig, except track 5, written by Christoph Papendieck, Gerret Frerichs, Kim Sanders and Sven Schumacher.

No.	Title	Length
1.	"Me and You"	4:40
2.	"Perfect"	4:54
3.	"Harmful"	4:28
4.	"Here She Comes"	4:37
5.	"I Can't Feel You"	4:07
6.	"Lost"	5:55
7.	"I'll Follow Behind"	4:20
8.	"Adrenalin"	1:08
9.	"Blink" (featuring Neele Ternes)	5:17
10.	"Thief"	4:36
11.	"Together"	4:45
12.	"74 Minutes"	2:56
13.	"You Turn"	11:05
Total length:		60:08

Bonus tracks
No.	Title	Writer(s)	Length
1.	"Me and You" (Warp Acht Mix)	Maile; Meyn; Kreyssig	5:23
2.	"You Turn" (Silent Night Mix)	Maile; Meyn; Kreyssig	5:02
Total length:			10:25

== Credits ==
- Co-producer – Heiko Maile (tracks: 1 to 5, 7, 9, 11)
- Guitar – Jörn Heilbutt (tracks: 3 to 5), Volker Hinkel (tracks: 6, 10, 12)
- Mixed By – Ralf C. Mayer (tracks: 6, 10, 12)
- Photography By – Mathias Bothor
- Producer – Heiko Maile (tracks: 6, 8, 10, 12, 13)
- Producer [Additional], Programmed By [Additional] – Andre Winter (tracks: 1 to 5, 7, 9, 11)
- Producer, Mixed By – Humate (tracks: 1 to 5, 7, 9, 11)
- Recorded By – Ronda Ray (alias Heiko Maile) (tracks: 6, 8, 10, 12, 13)
- Written-By – Heiko Maile (tracks: 1 to 4, 6 to 13), Marcus Meyn (tracks: 1 to 4, 6 to 13), Oliver Kreyssig (tracks: 1 to 4, 6 to 13)
