= Rewind – Best of 85–97 =

Rewind – Best of 95–87

Compilation album by Camouflage
- Released: 12 November 2001
- Recorded: 1987–1996
- Genre: Synthpop
- Length: 75:02
- Label: Polydor
- Producer: Axel Henninger, Camouflage, Colin Thurston, Dan Lacksman, Heiko Maile

Camouflage chronology
Spice Crackers (1995)	Rewind – Best of 95–87 (2001)	Sensor (2003)

Professional ratings
Review scores
Source	Rating
laut.de	4/5 stars

Rewind is a best-of collection released by German synthpop group Camouflage. The record was released on November 12, 2001, by Polydor.

== Overview ==
The album was the first compilation of theirs in which the group were able to contribute their ideas for song inclusions and input. It features not just singles, but also some album tracks. The 1999 single "Thief" was not included.

== Track listing ==
CD
No.	Title	Writer(s)	Length
1.	"Love Is a Shield (7" Version)"	Marcus Meyn, Oliver Kreyssig, Peter Godwin	4:00
2.	"That Smiling Face (Edit)"	Marcus Meyn	4:48
3.	"Suspicious Love (Radio Remix)"	Marcus Meyn	4:12
4.	"Strangers' Thoughts (7" Edit)"	Marcus Meyn	3:34
5.	"Sooner Than We Think"	Oliver Kreyssig	3:49
6.	"One Fine Day (Single Version)"	Marcus Meyn	3:59
7.	"Heaven (I Want You) (Single Edit)"	Heiko Maile, Marcus Meyn	3:45
8.	"Falling"	Marcus Meyn	6:34
9.	"The Great Commandment"	Marcus Meyn	4:11
10.	"Pedestrians' Adventures"	Nia Neutron, Marcus Meyn	3:52
11.	"Bad News (Single Edit)"	Moon Martin	3:29
12.	"Kraft"	Heiko Maile, Marcus Meyn	3:47
13.	"X-Ray"	Heiko Maile, Marcus Meyn	6:24
14.	"Neighbours (7" Remix)"	Marcus Meyn	3:40
15.	"Crime"	Marcus Meyn	5:26
16.	"This Day"	Heiko Maile, Marcus Meyn	3:50
17.	"Close (We Stroke the Flames)"	Nia Neutron, Marcus Meyn	4:06
18.	"I Once Had a Dream"	Marcus Meyn	4:57
Total length:			75:02

DVD
No.	Title	Length
1.	"The Great Commandment"
2.	"Strangers' Thoughts"
3.	"Neighbours"
4.	"Love Is a Shield"
5.	"One Fine Day"
6.	"Heaven (I Want You)"
7.	"This Day"
8.	"Handsome"
9.	"Suspicious Love"
10.	"Bad News"
11.	"X-Ray"

== Credits ==
- Compiled By – Gunther Buskies, Oliver Kreyssig
- Graphic Design – Oliver Kreyssig
- Lyrics – Heiko Maile (tracks: 7, 12, 13, 16), Marcus Meyn (tracks: 1 to 4, 6 to 10, 12 to 18), Nia Neutron (tracks: 10, 17), Oliver Kreyssig (tracks: 1, 5), Peter Godwin (tracks: 1)
- Music By – Heiko Maile (tracks: 1, 3, 4, 7 to 10, 12 to 18), Ingo Ito (tracks: 17), Marcus Meyn (tracks: 2, 6, 7, 9, 12 to 14, 16 to 18), Oliver Kreyssig (tracks: 5, 9, 18)
- Photography – Ross Anania
- Producer – Axel Henninger (tracks: 1, 2, 4, 9, 14, 18), Camouflage (tracks: 1, 2, 4 to 7, 9, 14, 16, 18), Colin Thurston (tracks: 7, 16), Dan Lacksman (tracks: 3, 5, 6, 8, 10, 15, 17), Heiko Maile (tracks: 3, 8, 10 to 13, 15, 17)
