= Love Is a Shield =

Single by Camouflage

from the album Methods of Silence
- B-side: "The Story of the Falling Fighters"
- Released: April 1989
- Recorded: November 1988; January 1989
- Studio: Dynaton (Weiterstadt)
- Genre: Synth-pop
- Length: 4:42 (album version); 3:59 (single version)
- Label: Metronome
- Songwriters: Heiko Maile; Oliver Kreyssig; Peter Godwin; Marcus Meyn
- Producers: Alex Henniger; Camouflage

Camouflage singles chronology
"That Smiling Face" (1989)	"Love Is a Shield" (1989)	"One Fine Day" (1989)

Music video
- "Love Is a Shield" on YouTube

"Love Is a Shield" is a song by German synth-pop trio Camouflage, released in April 1989 as the lead single from their second studio album, Methods of Silence.

The music video for the song was directed by Rainer Thieding.

== Track listing ==
- 7″ single (Europe, 1989)
1. "Love Is a Shield" – 3:59
2. "The Story of the Falling Fighters" – 3:58
- CD maxi single (Germany, 1989)
1. "Love Is a Shield" (extended version) – 5:20
2. "The Story of the Falling Fighters" (extended version) – 5:36
3. "Love Is a Shield" – 3:59
- 12″ promotional single (US-Remixes) (Germany, 1989)
1. "Love Is a Shield" (extended US mix) – 8:02
2. "Love Is a Shield" (Orbit dub) – 7:35
3. "Love Is a Shield" (ambient mix) – 5:00

== Charts ==
Chart performance for "Love Is a Shield"
Chart (1989)	Peak position
Austria (Ö3 Austria Top 40)	11
Germany (GfK)	9
Switzerland (Schweizer Hitparade)	29
US Alternative Airplay (Billboard)	23
US Dance Club Songs (Billboard)	35

== Certifications ==
Region	Certification	Certified units/sales
Germany (BVMI)	Gold	250,000^{‡}
^{‡} Sales+streaming figures based on certification alone.
