= Voices & Images =

Studio album by Camouflage
- Released: March 4, 1988
- Recorded: 1987–1988
- Genre: Synthpop
- Length: 54:03
- Label: Metronome 835 437-2, Atlantic
- Producers: Camouflage and Axel Henninger

Camouflage chronology
Voices & Images (1988)	Methods of Silence (1989)

Singles from Voices & Images
- 1. "The Great Commandment" Released: September 1987; 2. "Strangers' Thoughts" Released: February 1988; 3. "Neighbours" Released: May 1988; 4. "That Smiling Face" Released: March 1989

Voices & Images is the debut studio album by the German band Camouflage, released by Atlantic Records and Metronome on March 4, 1988. Four singles were released from the album: "The Great Commandment", "Strangers' Thoughts", "Neighbours", and "That Smiling Face".

A limited 30th anniversary edition of the album was released by German Tapete Records on October 12, 2018, featuring deleted remixes, rare versions, and B-sides.

== Reception ==
Professional ratings
Review scores
Source	Rating
AllMusic	2/5 stars

Giuseppe D'Amato of Ondarock called Voices & Images "an excellent opening statement, managing to combine Kraftwerk's measured geometries, OMD's airy pop and the claustrophobic atmospheres of the gloomiest, most depressing Depeche Mode".

== Track listing ==
No.	Title	Length
1.	"That Smiling Face"	4:51
2.	"Helpless Helpless"	5:30
3.	"Neighbours"	3:48
4.	"The Great Commandment"	4:17
5.	"Winner Takes Nothing"	5:56
6.	"Strangers' Thoughts"	4:43
7.	"From Ay to Bee"	4:37
8.	"Where Has the Childhood Gone"	3:38
9.	"Music for Ballerinas"	4:32
10.	"I Once Had a Dream"	4:57
11.	"They Catch Secrets"	3:26
12.	"Pompeji"	3:28

== Personnel ==
- Camouflage – production
- Axel Henninger - production, co-production, mixing, recording
- Heiko Maile - co-production
