= Close (We Stroke the Flames) =

Single by Camouflage

from the album Bodega Bohemia
- B-side: "Watch Out!"
- Released: 1993
- Recorded: 1992–1993
- Genre: Synth-pop
- Length: 4:12 (album version); 3:59 (single remix)
- Label: Metronome
- Songwriter(s): Ingo Ito; Heiko Maile; Marcus Meyn; Nia Neutron
- Producer(s): Dan Lacksman; Heiko Maile

Camouflage singles chronology
"Suspicious Love" (1993)	"Close (We Stroke the Flames)" (1993)	"Jealousy" (1993)

"Close (We Stroke the Flames)" is the second single from German synth-pop trio Camouflage's fourth album Bodega Bohemia, released in 1993. The song was remixed for single release, adding a much more radio-friendly drum and synth track to the mostly-acoustic album version.

== Lyrics ==
The text refers to the resurgent Neo-Nazism in Germany at that time with sentences like "They're marching on with torches....The tale is told again" and the warning "And if we don't care, we end up all the same. We stroke the flames, we never quenched all those years. We should have learned. from things which may come close."

== Track listing ==
- CD / 12″ single (Germany, 1993)
1. "Close (We Stroke the Flames)" (remix) – 3:59
2. "Close (We Stroke the Flames)" (album version) – 4:12
3. "Watch Out!" (instrumental) – 4:08

Track 1 remixed by Fischerman.

== Credits ==
- Design – Ingrid Albrecht
- Photography – Reiner Pfisterer
- Producer – Dan Lacksman, Heiko Maile
- Written-By – H. Maile
