= Fools Cry =

Single by Fancy

from the album Gold
- Released: September 1988
- Genre: Eurodisco
- Label: Metronome

Fancy singles chronology
"Flames of Love" (1988)	"Fools Cry" (1988)	"Angel Eyes" (1989)

Music video
- "Fools Cry" on YouTube

"Fools Cry" is a song by German pop singer Fancy. It was released as the lead single from his 1988 greatest-hits album Gold.

The music video was shot in London in late 1988, with an Asian acrobat doubling for the singer.

== Charts ==
Weekly chart performance for "Fools Cry"
Chart (1988)	Peak position
Europe (European Hot 100 Singles)	79
Finland (Suomen virallinen lista)	14
Spain	15
West Germany (GfK)	18
