= Thief (Camouflage song) =

Single by Camouflage

from the album Sensor
- B-side: "Isolation"
- Released: 12 July 1999
- Recorded: 1999
- Genre: Synth-pop
- Length: 4:36 (album version); 3:19 (single version)
- Label: Virgin
- Songwriter(s): Oliver Kreyssig; Heiko Maile; Marcus Meyn
- Producer(s): Heiko Maile

Camouflage singles chronology
"X-Ray" (1996)	"Thief" (1999)	"The Great Commandment 2.0" (2001)

"Thief" is a song by German synth-pop trio Camouflage, released as a single on 12 July 1999 via Virgin Records. It was later re-recorded and included on their sixth studio album Sensor in 2003.

== Overview ==
The record was the first single to feature band member Oliver Kreyssig since he departed the band in 1990. It was also the band's first single in three years.

According to an interview with the band in 2008, they originally recorded the song in a very modern style. This version was rejected by their label, who pushed them to instead produce it so it sounded more like their early work. The "Opal Mix" on the single appears to be the originally recorded version.

== Music video ==
The music video for "Thief" featured a woman caught up in some sort of love triangle with the three band members. It was directed by Marcus Sternberg.

== Track listings ==
- CD maxi single
1. "Thief" (single mix) – 3:19
2. "Isolation" – 5:45
3. "Thief" (Opal mix) – 3:31
4. "Thief" (Der Dritte Raum mix) – 5:56
5. "Thief" (Oh. Remix) – 4:18
- Promotional CD single
1. "Thief" (Layout mix) – 3:18
2. "Thief" (Layout instrumental) – 3:17
