= Neighbours (Camouflage song) =

Single by Camouflage

from the album Voices & Images
- B-side: "Every Now and Then"
- Released: May 1988
- Recorded: 1987
- Genre: Synth-pop
- Length: 3:51 (album version); 3:48 (7-inch version)
- Label: Metronome
- Songwriter: Marcus Meyn
- Producers: Alex Henniger; Camouflage

Camouflage singles chronology
"Strangers' Thoughts" (1988)	"Neighbours" (1988)	"That Smiling Face" (1989)

"Neighbours" is s song by German synth-pop trio Camouflage. It was the third single from their 1988 debut album Voices & Images. It was not released as a single in the US, where "That Smiling Face" was released later in 1988.

The song was re-recorded at Dynaton Studios for its single release.

== Music video ==
The music video for "Neighbours" features the band members strolling through a park where several young girls are playing croquet. One of their croquet balls disappears through a hoop, and another lands on a cross in the ground, and reveals a long, large zone filled with white crosses. The band stand and observe the sight.

== Track listing ==
- 7″ single (Germany, 1988)
1. "Neighbours" (7″ version) – 3:48
2. "Every Now and Then" – 4:30
- 12″ single (Europe, 1988)
1. "Neighbours" (12″ version) – 6:31
2. "Every Now and Then" – 4:30
- CD single (Europe, 1988)
1. "Neighbours" (7″ version) – 3:48
2. "Neighbours" (12″ version) – 6:31
3. "Every Now and Then" – 4:30

== Charts ==
Chart performance for "Neighbours"
Chart (1988)	Peak position
Germany (GfK)	58
