= Shine (Camouflage song) =

Single by Camouflage

from the album Greyscale
- Released: February 20, 2015
- Recorded: 2014
- Genre: Synth-pop; new wave
- Length: 4:32
- Label: Bureau B
- Songwriter(s): Heiko Maile; Jochen Schmalbach; Marcus Meyn; Oliver Kreyssig; Volker Hinkel
- Producer(s): Heiko Maile; Jochen Schmalbach; Volker Hinkel

Camouflage singles chronology
"The Pleasure Remains" (2007)	"Shine" (2015)	"Count on Me" (2015)

Music video
- "Shine" on YouTube

"Shine" is the lead single released from Greyscale, the eight studio album by German synth-pop trio Camouflage. The record was released on February 20, 2015 via Bureau B label. The composition features strings and orchestra parts performed by Deutsches Filmorchester Babelsberg.

== Track listing ==
CD maxi single
No.	Title	Length
1.	"Shine" (single version)	4:10
2.	"Shine" (Klaak remix)	5:26
3.	"Shine" (Car Crash Set remix)	6:42

== Credits ==
- Artwork – Christian Küpker
- Mastering – Tom Meyer
- Photography – Klaus Mellenthin
- Producer – Heiko Maile, Jochen Schmalbach, Volker Hinkel
- Written by – Heiko Maile, Jochen Schmalbach, Marcus Meyn, Oliver Kreyssig, Volker Hinkel
