= Get Your Kicks =

1985 studio album by Fancy

Studio album by Fancy
- Released: May 1985
- Studio: Transparent (Munich)
- Genre: Eurodisco
- Length: 38:08
- Label: Metronome
- Producer: Anthony Monn

Fancy chronology
Get Your Kicks (1985)	Contact (1986)

Singles from Get Your Kicks
- 1. "Slice Me Nice" Released: April 1984; 2. "Chinese Eyes" Released: September 1984; 3. "Get Lost Tonight" Released: December 1984; 4. "L.A.D.Y. O." Released: 1985; 5. "Check It Out" Released: 1985

Get Your Kicks is the debut studio album by German singer-songwriter Fancy, released in 1985, by Metronome Records.

== Track listing ==
Get Your Kicks – Side one
No.	Title	Writer(s)	Length
1.	"Colder Than Ice"	Anthony Monn; Steven Gill	6:00
2.	"Get Your Kicks"	Monn; Richard Palmer-James	5:50
3.	"L.A.D.Y. O."	Monn; Shane Dempsey	4:25
4.	"Slice Me Nice / Chinese Eyes (Special Mix)"	Monn; Todd Canedy	4:00
Total length:			20:15

Get Your Kicks – Side two
No.	Title	Writer(s)	Length
1.	"Check It Out"	Fancy; Monn; Dempsey	6:00
2.	"Blood and Honey"	Monn; Amanda Lear	6:13
3.	"In Shock"	Fancy; Palmer-James	5:40
Total length:			17:53

== Personnel ==
Credits adapted from the album's liner notes.

Musicians

- Fancy – lead vocals
- Claudia Schwarz – backing vocals
- Brigitte Peterreit – backing vocals
- Peter Bischof – backing vocals
- Jerry Rix – backing vocals

Production and design

- Anthony Monn – producer, sound engineer

== Charts ==
Weekly chart performance for Get Your Kicks
Chart (1985)	Peak position
Swedish Albums (Sverigetopplistan)	13
Swiss Albums (Schweizer Hitparade)	13
