= Lady of Ice =

Single by Fancy

from the album Contact
- B-side: "Transmutation (Instrumental)"
- Released: November 1986
- Genre: Disco; Pop; Eurodisco
- Length: 4:37 (album version); 4:20 (single version); 4:55 (12" version)
- Label: Metronome
- Songwriters: Anthony Monn; Walter Schmid
- Producers: Anthony Monn; Fancy

Fancy singles chronology
"Bolero (Hold Me in Your Arms Again)" (1985)	"Lady of Ice" (1986)	"Latin Fire" (1987)

Music video
- "Lady of Ice" on YouTube

"Lady of Ice" is a song by German pop singer Fancy, released as the second single from his 1986 album Contact. It was written by Anthony Monn and Walter Schmid. The song was released in November 1986 and reached the Top 20 in multiple European countries.

"Lady of Ice" is a hybrid of Disco and Pop music. The song's music video was produced in Holland in 1987.

== Charts ==
=== Weekly charts ===
Weekly chart performance for "Lady of Ice"
Chart (1986–1987)	Peak position
Europe (European Hot 100 Singles)	100
Finland (Suomen virallinen lista)	17
Sweden (Sverigetopplistan)	17
Switzerland (Schweizer Hitparade)	18
West Germany (GfK)	13

=== Year-end charts ===
Year-end chart performance for "Lady of Ice"
Chart (1987)	Position
West Germany (GfK)	60
