= I Can't Feel You =

Song by Camouflage

Single by Camouflage

from the album Sensor
- B-side: "Telephone Sensor"
- Released: August 25, 2003
- Recorded: 2001–2003
- Genre: Synthpop
- Length: 4:07 (album version); 3:48 (radio edit); 5:19 (extended version)
- Label: Polydor981 087-2
- Songwriter(s): Gerret Frerichs, Christoph Papendieck, Kim Sanders, Sven Schumacher
- Producer(s): Humate, Heiko Maile

Camouflage singles chronology
"Me and You" (2003)	"I Can't Feel You" (2003)	"Motif Sky" (2006)

"I Can't Feel You" is German synthpop group Camouflage's seventeenth single, released in August 2003 via the Polydor label as the second and final single from their sixth studio album Sensor.

As with the previous single "Me and You", "I Can't Feel You" was released with a remix CD in Europe.

== Track listings ==
CD single (Europe, 2003)

1. "I Can't Feel You" (radio edit) – 3:48
2. "I Can't Feel You" (extended version) – 5:19
3. "I Can't Feel You" (Mellow Trax Short Full Vocal Club remix) – 3:59
4. "Telephone Sensor" – 4:17

Remix CD single (Europe, 2003)

1. "I Can't Feel You" (Mesh remix) – 6:59
2. "I Can't Feel You" (Mellow Trax Full Vocal remix) – 7:47
3. "I Can't Feel You" (Mellow Trax Club remix) – 6:03

12" single (Europe, 2003)

1. "I Can't Feel You" (Mellow Trax Club remix) – 6:03
2. "I Can't Feel You" (extended version) – 5:19
3. "I Can't Feel You" (Mellow Trax Full Vocal remix) – 7:47
4. "Telephone Sensor" – 4:17

CD single (Germany, 2003)

1. "I Can't Feel You" (radio edit) – 3:48

== Credits ==
Credits for the European edition:

- Artwork – www.feedbackmedia.de
- Co-producer – Heiko Maile (tracks: 1 to 3)
- Guitar – Jörn Heilbutt (tracks: 1 to 3)
- Mastered By – Miles Showell (tracks: 1 to 3)
- Mixed By – Humate (tracks: 1 to 3)
- Mixed By [Mixing Assistant] – Arne Schuhmann (tracks: 1 to 3), Jonas Zadow (tracks: 1 to 3)
- Performer – Heiko Maile, Marcus Meyn, Oliver Kreyssig
- Photography By – Mathias Bothor
- Producer – Humate (tracks: 1 to 3)
- Producer [Additional], Programmed By [Additional] – Andre Winter (tracks: 1 to 3)
- Written-By – Christoph Papendieck (tracks: 1 to 3), Gerret Frerichs (tracks: 1 to 3), Kim Sanders (tracks: 1 to 3), Sven Schumacher (tracks: 1 to 3)
