= Contact (Fancy album) =

1986 studio album by Fancy

Studio album by Fancy
- Released: December 17, 1986
- Studio: Transparent, Hurricane (Munich)
- Genre: Eurodisco
- Length: 40:26
- Label: Metronome
- Producer: Anthony Monn; Fancy

Fancy chronology
Get Your Kicks (1985)	Contact (1986)	Flames of Love (1988)

Singles from Contact
- 1. "Bolero (Hold Me in Your Arms Again)" Released: December 1985; 2. "Lady of Ice" Released: November 1986; 3. "Latin Fire" Released: April 1987; 4. "Raving Queen" Released: 1987

Contact is the second studio album by German singer-songwriter Fancy, released in 1986, by Metronome Records.

== Track listing ==
Contact – Side one
No.	Title	Writer(s)	Length
1.	"Raving Queen"	Anthony Monn; Shane Dempsey	4:20
2.	"I Don't Want to Go"	Jens Gad	4:06
3.	"Bolero (Hold Me in Your Arms Again)"	Monn; Dempsey	4:00
4.	"Feedback, Feedback"	Monn; Dempsey	5:02
5.	"Save the Moment"	Fancy; Monn; Dempsey; Alfons Weindorf	4:17
Total length:			21:45

Contact – Side two
No.	Title	Writer(s)	Length
1.	"Lady of Ice"	Monn; Walter Schmid	4:37
2.	"Girl Don't Let Me Down"	Gad	4:18
3.	"Latin Fire"	Monn	5:09
4.	"After Midnight"	Fancy; Sabrina Lorenz	4:37
Total length:			18:41

== Personnel ==
Credits adapted from the album's liner notes.

Musicians

- Fancy – lead vocals
- Anthony Monn – keyboards
- Jens Gad – keyboards
- Martin D'Arese – keyboards
- Walter Schmid – keyboards
- Pit Löw – keyboards
- Julian Feifel – guitars
- Shane Dempsey – drums, keyboards

Production and design

- Fancy – producer
- Anthony Monn – producer, sound engineer, mixing

== Charts ==
Weekly chart performance for Contact
Chart (1986–1987)	Peak position
German Albums (Offizielle Top 100)	57
Swedish Albums (Sverigetopplistan)	43
