= Me and You (Camouflage song) =

Single by Camouflage

from the album Sensor
- B-side: "Perfect"
- Released: April 2003
- Recorded: 2001–2003
- Genre: Synthpop
- Length: 4:40 (album version); 3:31 (radio mix)
- Label: Polydor
- Songwriters: Oliver Kreyssig, Heiko Maile, Marcus Meyn, Ronda Ray
- Producers: Humate, Heiko Maile

Camouflage singles chronology
"The Great Commandment 2.0" (2001)	"Me and You" (2003)	"I Can't Feel You" (2003)

"Me and You" is German synthpop group Camouflage's sixteenth single, taken from their sixth studio album Sensor and released in April 2003.

The single was backed with a radio edit, two remixes and also a remix of album track "Perfect". A remix single was also released in Europe, which featured additional remixes from Humate, Smallboy and Warp Acht. The Warp Acht remix was later added to "Sensor" as a bonus track.

== Music video ==
The music video features Marcus' reflection on the walls of a train station, while various people observe and carry around portraits of the band members, which also feature on the single cover. Marcus is also shown singing in a studio on several television screens.

== Track listings ==
CD single (Europe, 2003)

1. "Me and You" (radio version) – 3:31
2. "Me and You" (F.E.O.S. and Sniper Mode Downbeat mix) – 5:09
3. "Me and You" (Kaycee's Downbeat mix) – 5:44
4. "Perfect" (Huntemann and Bodzin mix) – 4:37

12" single (Germany, 2003)

1. "Me and You" (Humate mix) – 8:50
2. "Me and You" (F.E.O.S. Tech mix) – 7:16
3. "Me and You" (Smallboy mix) – 4:39

Remix CD single (Europe, 2003)

1. "Me and You" (Humate mix) – 8:49
2. "Me and You" (Smallboy mix) – 4:39
3. "Me and You" (F.E.O.S. Tech mix) – 7:16
4. "Me and You" (Warp Acht mix) – 6:23
