= The Great Commandment (disambiguation) =

The Great Commandment is a Christian film by Irving Pichel.

The Great Commandment may also refer to:

- Great Commandment, the commandment in Christianity
- New Commandment, the new commandment of Jesus
- "The Great Commandment" (song), a song by Camouflage
