= Flames of Love (song) =

Single by Fancy

from the album Flames of Love
- Released: April 1988
- Genre: Eurodisco
- Label: Metronome

Fancy singles chronology
" China Blue" (1987)	"Flames of Love" (1988)	"Fools Cry" (1988)

Music video
- "Flames of Love" on YouTube

"Flames of Love" is a song by German pop singer Fancy. It was released as a single and is included on his 1988 album Flames of Love.

== Music video ==
The music video was completed in April 1988. As Fancy recalls, the close-ups for the video were shot in Munich, while the shots showing the audience and him on stage were shot in a folkpark (a public park) in Sweden.

== Charts ==
Weekly chart performance for "Flames of Love"
Chart (1988)	Peak position
Austria (Ö3 Austria Top 40)	13
Europe (European Hot 100 Singles)	58
Finland (Suomen virallinen lista)	29
Spain	13
Germany (GfK)	14

=== Year-end charts ===
Year-end chart performance for "Flames of Love"
Chart (1988)	Position
West Germany	55
