= Bolero (Hold Me in Your Arms Again) =

Single by Fancy

from the album Contact
- B-side: "Play Me the Bolero (Dub Version)"
- Released: December 1985
- Genre: Eurodisco
- Length: 4:00 (album version); 4:02 (single version); 5:45 (12" version)
- Label: Metronome
- Songwriters: Anthony Monn; Shane Dempsey
- Producer: Anthony Monn

Fancy singles chronology
"Check It Out" (1985)	"Bolero (Hold Me in Your Arms Again)" (1985)	"Lady of Ice" (1986)

"Bolero (Hold Me in Your Arms Again)" is a song by German pop singer Fancy. It was released in December 1985 as the first single from his 1986 album Contact.

The original music video for the song was produced in Hamburg.

The song reached #1 in Spain.

== Charts ==
Weekly chart performance for "Bolero (Hold Me in Your Arms Again)"
Chart (1986)	Peak position
Belgium (Ultratop 50 Flanders)	27
Finland (Suomen virallinen lista)	5
Netherlands (Single Top 100)	18
Spain	1
Sweden (Sverigetopplistan)	11
