= Slice Me Nice =

1984 single by Fancy

Single by Fancy

from the album Get Your Kicks
- B-side: "Come Inside"
- Released: April 1984
- Studio: Transparent (Munich)
- Genre: Eurodisco
- Length: 4:20
- Label: Metronome
- Songwriter: Todd Canedy
- Producer: Fancy

Fancy singles chronology
"Slice Me Nice" (1984)	"Chinese Eyes" (1984)

Music video
- "Slice Me Nice" on YouTube

"Slice Me Nice" is the debut single by German singer-songwriter Fancy, released in 1984, under the label Metronome Records.

== Background ==
Interviewed for the book Europe's Stars of '80s Dance Pop: 32 International Music Legends Discuss Their Careers, Segieth explained how the song came about:

Todd heard my demo tape of "Slice Me Nice". The tape had the whole melody (intro, verses, bridge and chorus), the bass line, and the instrumental riff as well. I asked him to play all my melody tracks on a four-track tape, and I said to him, 'Write me a funny, crazy, power-disco-nonsense story!'. He brought me the words 'slice-me-nice'. Very crazy indeed.

Todd's wife had just had a baby. I gave my composition as a gift to Todd—he worked fast for me on the lyrics, and he did a very good job. I was not thinking of the money; it wasn't all about the money for me. Well, we went to Arco Studios in Munich, and we listened to the playback with all my melody riffs and my base line. Than I sang his lyrics.

The final mix was played one week later in Hamburg for Intersong (Warner/Chappell) Publishing. The executives there said, 'Give us the tape, and in 24 hours we will bring you a deal'. The next day, I received the confirmation—Metronome Records would release "Slice Me Nice".

— Manfred Segieth

== Track listing and formats ==
- German 7-inch single

A. "Slice Me Nice" – 4:20
B. "Come Inside" – 5:00

- German 12-inch maxi-single

A. "Slice Me Nice" – 5:20
B. "Come Inside" – 5:00

== Charts ==
=== Weekly charts ===
Weekly chart performance for "Slice Me Nice"
Chart (1984)	Peak position
Austria (Ö3 Austria Top 40)	2
Sweden (Sverigetopplistan)	7
Switzerland (Schweizer Hitparade)	9
West Germany (GfK)	11

=== Year-end charts ===
Year-end chart performance for "Slice Me Nice"
Chart (1984)	Position
West Germany (Official German Charts)	52

== Bibliography ==
- Arena, James (2017). Europe's Stars of '80s Dance Pop: 32 International Music Legends Discuss Their Careers. McFarland & Company. p. 213. ISBN 9781476630144.
