= Chinese Eyes =

1984 single by Fancy

Single by Fancy

from the album Get Your Kicks
- B-side: "Burn with Impatience"
- Released: September 1984
- Studio: Transparent (Munich)
- Genre: Eurodisco
- Length: 4:24
- Label: Metronome
- Songwriters: Anthony Monn; Todd Canedy
- Producer: Fancy

Fancy singles chronology
"Slice Me Nice" (1984)	"Chinese Eyes" (1984)	"Get Lost Tonight" (1984)

Music video
- "Chinese Eyes" on YouTube

"Chinese Eyes" is a song by German singer-songwriter Fancy from his debut studio album, Get Your Kicks (1985). It was written by Anthony Monn and Todd Canedy.

== Track listing and formats ==
- German 7-inch single

A. "Chinese Eyes" – 4:24
B. "Burn with Impatience" – 4:27

- German 12-inch maxi-single

A. "Chinese Eyes" – 5:48
B. "Burn with Impatience" – 4:58

== Charts ==
Weekly chart performance for "Chinese Eyes"
Chart (1984–1985)	Peak position
Austria (Ö3 Austria Top 40)	17
Finland (Suomen virallinen lista)	23
Switzerland (Schweizer Hitparade)	9
US Dance Club Songs (Billboard)	2
US Dance Singles Sales (Billboard)	7
West Germany (GfK)	9
