= The Singles (Camouflage album) =

Compilation album by Camouflage
- Released: 7 February 2014
- Recorded: 1987–2006
- Genre: Synthpop
- Length: 74:45
- Label: Polydor 3771704

Camouflage chronology
Relocated (2006)	The Singles (2014)	Greyscale (2015)

The Singles is a singles compilation album released by German synthpop group Camouflage on 7 February 2014 via Polydor label. The album contains all of the band's twenty singles, remastered in their original single versions.

== Release ==
The Singles was announced on 22 January 2014 via the band's website, coming soon after the announcement of their first boxset release The Box 1983-2013 and their eighth studio album Greyscale.

The album contains all of the band's singles from 1987's The Great Commandment to 2007's The Pleasure Remains. All of the tracks have been remastered. It is also the debut release of the original seven-inch version of The Great Commandment on CD, as well as the debut of the single versions of "Thief" and "The Great Commandment 2.0" on an album.

== Track listing ==
The Singles
No.	Title	Length
1.	"The Great Commandment" (7" Version)	3:12
2.	"Strangers' Thoughts" (7" Edit)	3:31
3.	"Neighbours" (7" Version)	3:41
4.	"That Smiling Face"	4:48
5.	"Love Is a Shield" (Single Version)	4:00
6.	"One Fine Day" (Single Version)	3:59
7.	"Heaven (I Want You)" (Single Version)	3:44
8.	"This Day"	3:45
9.	"Suspicious Love" (Radio Version)	4:14
10.	"Close (We Stroke the Flames)" (Remix)	4:01
11.	"Jealousy"	3:31
12.	"Bad News" (Single Edit)	3:27
13.	"X-Ray" (Tranceformer Single Mix)	3:34
14.	"Thief" (Single Mix)	3:19
15.	"The Great Commandment 2.0" (Radio Edit)	3:54
16.	"Me and You" (Radio Version)	3:30
17.	"I Can't Feel You" (Radio Edit)	3:48
18.	"Motif Sky"	3:10
19.	"Something Wrong" (Single Edit)	3:34
20.	"The Pleasure Remains"	4:03
Total length:		74:45
