= China Blue (song) =

Single by Fancy

from the album Flames of Love
- Released: December 1987
- Genre: Eurodisco
- Label: Metronome

Fancy singles chronology
"Raving Queen" (1987)	"China Blue" (1987)	"Flames of Love" (1988)

Music video
- "China Blue" on YouTube

"China Blue" is a song by German pop singer Fancy. It was released as a single in December 1987 and subsequently included on his 1988 album Flames of Love.

The music video for the song features Fancy and his two then-keyboardists. As Fancy recalls, he never saw the young woman featured in the video in real life, the shots with her were added by his video art director.

== Charts ==
Chart (1988)	Peak position
Spain	34
West Germany (GfK)	50
