= X-Ray (song) =

Single by Camouflage

from the album Spice Crackers
- B-side: "In Search of Ray Milland"
- Released: 1996
- Genre: Synth-pop
- Length: 6:24 (album version); 3:38 (single remix)
- Label: RCA; BMG
- Songwriter(s): Heiko Maile; Marcus Meyn

Camouflage singles chronology
"Bad News" (1995)	"X-Ray" (1996)	"Thief" (1999)

"X-Ray" is a song by German synth-pop trio Camouflage, released in 1996 as the second and final single from their fifth studio album, Spice Crackers (1995).

The single contains three versions of the song: the Soft Single Mix, which is an edit of the album version; the Ronda Ray single mix, which adds extra instrumentation to the Soft Single Mix; and the Tranceformer remix, which is a different take on the song and is the main single and video mix.

== Music video ==
The music video depicts the two band members promoting some sort of campaign which involves "X-Ray" glasses (portrayed by conventional 3D cinema glasses).

== Track listings ==
- CD maxi single
1. "X-Ray" (Tranceformer single remix) – 3:38
2. "X-Ray" (Soft single mix) – 3:55
3. "X-Ray" (Ronda Ray single mix) – 3:45
4. "In Search of Ray Milland" – 5:53
- 12″ maxi single
1. "X-Ray" (Tranceformer maxi mix) – 6:47
2. "X-Ray" (Tranceformer single remix) – 3:38
3. "X-Ray" (Ronda Ray single mix) – 3:45
4. "X-Ray" (Soft single mix) – 3:55

== Credits ==
- Art Direction, Photography by [Photo Through The Space Train Window] – Michel Moers
- Design – Atelier Albrecht
- Management – Bear Music Factory GmbH
- Photography by – Reiner Pfisterer
- Written-By – Heiko Maile, Marcus Meyn (tracks: 1 to 3)
