= Greyscale (album) =

Studio album by Camouflage
- Released: 6 March 2015 (Germany); 27 March 2015 (worldwide)
- Recorded: 2011–2014
- Genre: Synthpop
- Length: 59:49
- Label: Bureau B
- Producer: Volker Hinkel, Heiko Maile, Jochen Schmalbach

Camouflage chronology
The Singles (2014)	Greyscale (2015)

Singles from Greyscale
- 1. "Shine" Released: 20 February 2015; 2. "Count on Me" Released: 9 October 2015

Professional ratings
Review scores
Source	Rating
Release Magazine	9/10 stars
Cryptic Rock	4/5 stars
laut.de	4/5 stars

Greyscale is the eighth studio album by German synthpop band Camouflage. The record was released on 6 March 2015 in Germany and on 27 March 2015 in the rest of the world via Bureau B label. It is the band's first studio album in nine years, following 2006's Relocated. Greyscale peaked at #14 in the German charts.

== Background ==
Greyscale was recorded over a period of four years between 2011 and 2014. The album was first officially confirmed on 3 November 2013 as part of an announcement detailing the band's 30th anniversary plans, and was scheduled for a September 2014 release. However, due to delays in production and other events, the album was delayed until February 2015. Various snippets of new tracks were posted on the band's website throughout 2014. On 19 December 2014, details of the album's release were announced on the band's website.

== Singles ==
- "Shine" was released as the lead single from Greyscale on 20 February 2015. The music video for the single premiered on 6 February 2015. "Shine" was first previewed at a live performance in 2011, along with the album track "Misery".
- The second single from Greyscale, "Count on Me", was released on 9 October 2015.

== Track listing ==
CD/digital download
No.	Title	Length
1.	"Shine"	4:32
2.	"Laughing"	6:13
3.	"In the Cloud"	5:09
4.	"Count on Me" (with Peter Heppner)	4:40
5.	"Greyscale"	4:24
6.	"Still"	4:55
7.	"Misery"	3:53
8.	"Leave Your Room Behind"	4:51
9.	"Light Grey"	1:15
10.	"If..."	4:52
11.	"End of Words"	5:42
12.	"Dark Grey"	3:02
13.	"I'll Find"	6:11

LP
No.	Title	Length
1.	"Shine"	4:32
2.	"Laughing"	5:56
3.	"In the Cloud"	5:09
4.	"Count on Me" (with Peter Heppner)	4:40
5.	"I'll Find"	6:06
6.	"Still"	4:55
7.	"Misery"	3:53
8.	"Leave Your Room Behind"	5:00
9.	"Light Grey"	1:15
10.	"End of Words"	5:42
11.	"Dark Grey"	3:02

== Review ==
Greyscale, the new album from German synthpop legend Camouflage, blends melancholy and hope into a rich, beautiful tapestry. It reflects the best of the group's signature sound while also updating it and giving it a contemporary spin. Considering the gestation period of this album (it's been almost 9 years since Relocated was released), Greyscale doesn't have the sound of an overly-fussed-over, sterile album that got tweaked one too many times. Rather, it displays a subtle beauty that shows a group that's at top of its game. It's the closest thing to a masterpiece I've listened to in quite some time. There's no filler here.

—Modern Synthpop
