= Strangers' Thoughts =

Single by Camouflage

from the album Voices & Images
- B-side: "They Catch Secrets"
- Released: February 1988
- Recorded: 1987
- Genre: Synth-pop
- Length: 4:47 (album version); 3:32 (7″ version)
- Label: Metronome
- Songwriter(s): Marcus Meyn
- Producer(s): Alex Henniger; Camouflage

Camouflage singles chronology
"The Great Commandment" (1987)	"Strangers' Thoughts" (1988)	"Neighbours" (1988)

"Strangers' Thoughts" is a song by German synth-pop trio Camouflage from their 1988 debut album Voices & Images. It was released as a single in early 1988.

A video single was released in the UK, featuring album tracks from Voices & Images and the video for the single, directed by Rainer Thieding.

== Track listing ==
- 7″ single (Europe, 1988)
1. "Strangers' Thoughts" (7″ version) – 3:32
2. "They Catch Secrets" – 3:26
- 12″ single (Denmark, 1988)
1. "Strangers' Thoughts" (longer) – 5:58
2. "They Catch (More) Secrets" – 4:31
3. "Zwischenspiel" – 2:38
- CD single (Germany, 1988)
1. "Strangers' Thoughts" (7″ version) – 3:32
2. "Strangers' Thoughts" (longer) – 5:58
3. "They Catch (More) Secrets" – 4:31
4. "Zwischenspiel" – 2:38
- CDV video single (UK, 1988)
1. "Music for Ballerinas" – 4:28
2. "I Once Had a Dream" – 4:59
3. "That Smiling Face" – 4:47
4. "Strangers' Thoughts" (LP version) – 4:41
5. "Strangers' Thoughts" (video)

== Charts ==
Chart performance for "Strangers' Thoughts"
Chart (1988)	Peak position
Germany (GfK)	20
