= Camouflage (band) =

German synth-pop band

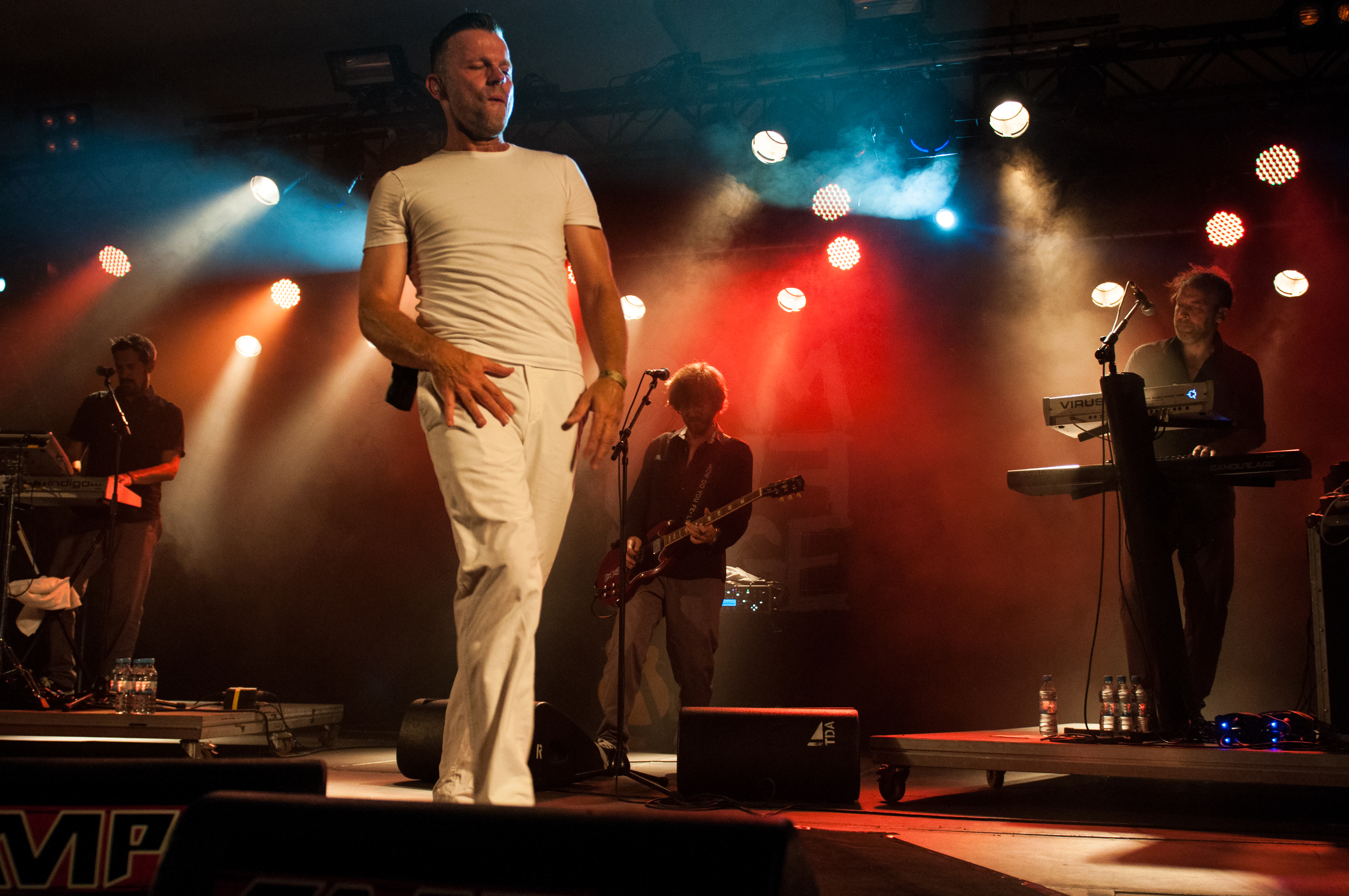
- Camouflage in 2014

Background information
- Also known as: Licensed Technology (1983–1984)
- Origin: Bietigheim-Bissingen, West Germany
- Genres: Synth-pop
- Years active: 1983–present
- Labels: SPV; Atlantic
- Members: Heiko Maile; Marcus Meyn; Oliver Kreyssig
- Past members: Martin Kähling

Camouflage is a German synth-pop trio consisting of lead singer Marcus Meyn (b. May 2, 1966), Heiko Maile and Oliver Kreyssig. They achieved a Billboard Hot 100 hit with "The Great Commandment", which reached number 59 in early 1989, and spent three weeks at number 1 on the Dance Club Songs chart. They also had two minor dance hits in 1989.

== History ==
In 1983, Heiko Maile, Marcus Meyn, Oliver Kreyssig, and Martin Kähling, four friends from Bietigheim-Bissingen, Germany, formed the band Licensed Technology. It was short-lived, as Kähling left in 1984. Soon after, the remaining three members renamed themselves "Camouflage", inspired by a Yellow Magic Orchestra (YMO) song of the same name. The three young musicians set up their first studio in the basement of Heiko's parents' house, calling it "Boy's Factory". Their first live gigs at local music clubs soon followed. The band's formative musical influences included YMO, Orchestral Manoeuvres in the Dark, Ultravox and Deutsch Amerikanische Freundschaft.

In 1985, Camouflage recorded two demo tapes at their studio, and the following year, the group won a local radio music contest, after a friend of theirs handed one of the demos in. A small Frankfurt music label, Westside, showed interest in taking Camouflage on. There, the song "The Great Commandment" was recorded to be presented to bigger music companies. After considering offers from several record companies, Camouflage decided to sign a contract with Metronome.

=== Voices & Images and Methods of Silence (1987–1989) ===
Working with Axel Henninger, Camouflage re-recorded "The Great Commandment" in Henninger's studio in 1987. The single was released in September of that year and rose to number 14 in the German charts. Their follow-up single "Strangers' Thoughts" was released in February 1988, rising to number 20. In March, Voices & Images, Camouflage's debut album, was released. The album topped the US Billboard Dance Charts twice having been played often by small independent radio stations. In New York, Maile, Kreyssig and Meyn signed a contract with the US label Atlantic that same year, releasing Voices & Images and the single "That Smiling Face" for the US market in the fall of 1988. In an old factory loft near their hometown, Maile, Kreyssig and Meyn set up "Boy's Factory 2", their new studio.

With producer Dan Lacksman of Telex, the band recorded a new album Methods of Silence at Synsound Studio in Brussels that following year. Now left to experiment more freely after the commercial success of their first album, Dan's recording work revealed an interesting mix of digital high-tech and out-dated studio equipment. The single "Love Is a Shield" (number 9 in German charts) stayed in the charts for over six months, and the album reached number 13. After follow-up single "One Fine Day", the band embarked on their first live concert tour to great financial success. At the beginning of 1990, Kreyssig left the band for personal reasons.

=== Meanwhile, Areu Areu and Bodega Bohemia (1991–1993) ===
In October, Maile and Meyn began work on the third album Meanwhile at the Black Barn Studio in England with producer Colin Thurston (who worked with Duran Duran, David Bowie and Talk Talk). Taking a different path, this album included real drums and conventional musical instruments played by guest musicians. The first single "Heaven (I Want You)" was released in Germany and the US, reaching number 57 in their home country. Three months after their second German tour commenced, they released the album's second single, the double-A side "This Day" / "Handsome".

In a 1995 interview, Meyn said:

Naturally we would have preferred that things had gone differently. But it was our wish at the time to make this type of record. For that reason the situation was perfectly OK for us. Looking back today, we would have liked to have had better advice at the time, recommending against this drastic stylistic change in our music. But things went the way they did...

After relocating to Hamburg in 1992, the duo founded their own music publishing company and studio, which saw the release of the side project Areu Areu. During this time, they also began recording work for their fourth album. The goal with this album was to incorporate as many electronic influences as possible into their work. Their 1993 lead single "Suspicious Love" received radio airplay and got rotation play on MTV, although it made only a minor chart placement. For this, the band faulted its record company Metronome for eschewing the band over other clients such as Ace of Base. As a result, Bodega Bohemia and the follow-up singles "Close (We Stroke the Flames)" and "Jealousy" were only released in Germany.

=== Failed opera project, Spice Crackers and We Stroke the Flames (1994–1997) ===
The next few years were not happy ones for the band. Maile and Meyn signed a contract with the organizer of an opera project via mutual friends, but after investing more than a half year, visual concepts and demo recordings to the project, legal disputes between shareholders and organizers prevented any performance from taking place, and ensuing frustrations led the duo to consider leaving the music business entirely.

The manager of the band Die Fantastischen Vier, Andreas "Bär" Läsker, signalled a desire to work with the band and helped them secure a recording contract with BMG (Germany) in 1994 for a fifth album. As the new contract allowed complete freedom of production, Maile and Meyn revised music they had written for the failed opera project and added experimental and more creative approaches to the new tracks, including writing music inspired by science fiction films. However, the new album Spice Crackers, preceded by the single "Bad News" and chased by the single "X-Ray", was not a commercial success. The duo temporarily went separate ways to collaborate on various musical projects such as 1996's various artist compilation CD Treasury to which Camouflage contributed the song "Winter".

In 1997, Sony Music and Polydor released a compilation of past hits called We Stroke the Flames and a limited edition maxi single with previously released mixes of "Suspicious Love", "Handsome", and "Love Is a Shield", albeit without input from Maile and Meyn. However, this promising new contract ended without further releases for reasons not revealed. Former band member Oliver Kreyssig, who had remained good friends with Maile and Meyn, was by this time working with Polydor and helped with the artwork design of the album and single. This was his first professional involvement with the band since his departure, and ended with him rejoining the band as a member in 1999.

=== Thief, Sensor and Relocated (1999–2007) ===
Now a trio again, the band began work on a sixth studio album, beginning with the single "Thief". Although it climbed for two weeks in Germany, the band members continued on with their various side projects. In June 2000 Camouflage played their first live gig in many years in Freiberg.

In 2001, Polydor (which had bought the band's former label Metronome) released the compilation best-of album Rewind, for which Camouflage was finally allowed sufficient opportunity for input and song selection ideas. The limited version DVD included all of the video clips from the Metronome and BMG phases of the band's career. That year Polydor also released the single "You Were There" from the dance project Resistance D featuring the vocals of Meyn. Its sound was much like that of Camouflage and subsequently caused a significant amount of confusion with fans.

Camouflage had by this time signed a new contract with Virgin Records and was still tentatively working on a sixth album. However, the band determined that in order to justify the release of an album they had to have at least one successful new single to precede it. At the suggestion of Virgin, the band attempted a comeback attempt with the release of a new version of their classic song "The Great Commandment". To avoid rights violations with their previous record company, vocals were also re-recorded. "The Great Commandment 2.0" was produced by the London trio Toy with drums by Christian Eigner, who had previously toured with various electronic bands, including Depeche Mode. "The Great Commandment 2.0" climbed the charts for three weeks, but only reached number 85. The disappointing result left little hope for a release of a sixth album with Virgin.

Because of this, the band decided to pursue other options with Polydor, culminating in the long delayed Sensor in 2003 – a long path from the 1999 single "Thief" until now. Sensor was produced by Rob Kirawn and Toy in London and Gerret Frerichs in Hamburg. While there wasn't a plan for how Sensor was intended to sound, they felt it was important to emphasize classic Camouflage songwriting strengths and return to an electronic presentation. The first single "Me and You" reached number 53 on the German charts, while the album crested at number 26. The Sensor tour took the band across Germany and for first time to Russia and other countries and to Istanbul, Turkey. The single "I Can't Feel You" only charted at number 75. Meanwhile, Polydor underwent restructuring in the face of a declining recording industry and once again plans were shelved for additional singles or albums. Nevertheless, the band continued writing new songs.

In 2004, Camouflage signed a new contract with SPV and Maile moved to Berlin to begin work on a new album with Oli and Marcus with Heiko taking on production responsibilities, resulting in the band's seventh studio album Relocated in 2006. Three singles were released from the album—"Motif Sky", "Something Wrong" and "The Pleasure Remains", the last title only in Poland. The tour saw the band for the first time playing in South America and Mexico.

In 2007, Polydor released Archive#1 (Rare Tracks), a new Camouflage compilation of rare tracks and remixes on two discs.

=== The Box 1983–2013 and Greyscale (2011–present) ===
In February 2014, Camouflage released the box set The Box 1983–2013, celebrating their 30 years together. The box contains remastered versions of all seven Camouflage studio albums, the Areu Areu EP, and two new Archive discs of live and demo recordings. The boxset is individually numbered, signed, and limited to 1000 copies. The band also celebrated their 30th anniversary at a live event in Dresden on 8 February 2014. There was a special exhibition before and after this live event where fans had the chance the view and photograph many materials, belongings, studio stuff from the beginning up to then.

Camouflage's eighth studio album Greyscale was due for release on 12 September 2014, with the single "Shine" due to be released shortly before the album. A tour to promote the album was also to begin in January 2015. "Shine", and another new song "Misery", were debuted during a live performance in 2011. Delays in the production of the album caused the release date to be postponed to 13 February 2015. The tour has also been postponed to March 2015.

On 19 December 2014, details were released for the new album, which was due for release on 6 March 2015 in Germany and on 27 March for other countries. The lead single from Greyscale, "Shine", was released on 20 February 2015. The album features a duet with Wolfsheim vocalist Peter Heppner, called "Count on Me", which was released as the second single from the album on 9 October 2015.

== Discography ==
=== Studio albums ===
List of studio albums, with selected details and chart positions
Title	Details	Peak chart positions	
Title	Details	GER	US
Voices & Images	Released: 4 March 1988; Label: Metronome, Atlantic	16	100
Methods of Silence	Released: 5 June 1989; Label: Metronome, Atlantic	13	—
Meanwhile	Released: 26 March 1991; Label: Metronome, Atlantic	61	—
Bodega Bohemia	Released: 26 April 1993; Label: Metronome	10	—
Spice Crackers	Released: 11 September 1995; Label: RCA	37	—
Sensor	Released: 26 May 2003; Label: Island, Polydor	26	—
Relocated	Released: 25 August 2006; Label: Synthetic Symphony	57	—
Greyscale	Released: 6 March 2015; Label: Bureau B	14	—
"—" denotes a recording that did not chart or was not released in that territory.

=== Compilation albums ===
- Best of Camouflage: We Stroke the Flames (1997)
- Rewind – Best of 85–97 (2001)
- Archive#1 (Rare Tracks) (2007)
- The Singles (2014)
- The Box 1983–2013 (2014) (10 CD box set)

=== Live albums ===
- Live in Dresden (2009) (live album/DVD)

=== Other albums ===
- Demo (1985)

=== Singles ===
List of singles, with selected chart positions, showing year released
Title	Year	Peak chart positions					
Title	Year	AUT	GER	SWI	US	US Dance	US Alt.
"The Great Commandment"	1987	—	14	—	59	1	3
"Strangers' Thoughts"	1988	—	20	—	—	—	—
"Neighbours"	1988	—	58	—	—	—	—
"That Smiling Face"	1989	—	—	—	—	37	26
"Love Is a Shield"	1989	11	9	29	—	35	23
"One Fine Day"	1989	—	—	—	—	—	—
"Heaven (I Want You)"	1991	—	57	—	—	—	18
"This Day" / "Handsome"	1991	—	—	—	—	—	—
"Suspicious Love"	1993	—	—	—	—	—	—
"Close (We Stroke the Flames)"	1993	—	—	—	—	—	—
"Jealousy"	1993	—	—	—	—	—	—
"Bad News"	1995	—	—	—	—	—	—
"X-Ray"	1996	—	—	—	—	—	—
"Love Is a Shield" / "Handsome" / "Suspicious Love" (Note: Released as a limited edition 12-inch single.)	1997	—	—	—	—	—	—
"Thief"	1999	—	94	—	—	—	—
"The Great Commandment 2.0"	2001	—	85	—	—	—	—
"Me and You"	2003	—	53	—	—	—	—
"I Can't Feel You"	2003	—	75	—	—	—	—
"Motif Sky"	2006	—	—	—	—	—	—
"Something Wrong"	2006	—	—	—	—	—	—
"The Pleasure Remains"	2007	—	—	—	—	—	—
"Shine"	2015	—	—	—	—	—	—
"Count on Me" (with Peter Heppner)	2015	—	—	—	—	—	—
"—" denotes a recording that did not chart or was not released in that territory.

== See also ==
- List of number-one dance hits (United States)
- List of artists who reached number one on the U.S. dance chart
