= Methods of Silence =

Studio album by Camouflage
- Released: 5 June 1989
- Genre: Synth-pop
- Length: 39:17
- Label: Atlantic
- Producer: Dan Lacksman

Camouflage chronology
Voices & Images (1988)	Methods of Silence (1989)	Meanwhile (1991)

Singles from Methods of Silence
- 1. "Love Is a Shield" Released: April 1989; 2. "One Fine Day" Released: October 1989

Professional ratings
Review scores
Source	Rating
AllMusic	3/5 stars

Methods of Silence is the second studio album by German synth-pop trio Camouflage, released in June 1989 by Atlantic Records. The single "Love Is a Shield" reached number 9 on the German singles chart, making it Camouflage's most successful song, and number 20 on the US Billboard Alternative Airplay chart.

== Background ==
Camouflage set up a new studio, "Boys Factory 2", near their home town before entering the Synsound Studio in Brussels in early 1989. The producer, Dan Lacksman (known for his work with Telex), used both modern and old technology to create the new album. The band was given more creative freedom due to their previous success.

== Chart performance ==
The album reached number 13 on the German albums chart. The first single, "Love Is a Shield", was also a hit, reaching number 9 on the singles chart, and has become one of the band's best-known songs.

== Professional reviews ==
A review by AllMusic wrote that the album's "material contrasted sharply with the vibrancy of the ensuing decade" referring to the decline of the Synthpop genre at the beginning of the 1990s. The album was however noted for its sonic precision and a reliance on pop-song structures.

== Track listing ==
No.	Title	Length
1.	"One Fine Day"	4:35
2.	"Love Is a Shield"	4:42
3.	"Anyone"	3:45
4.	"Your Skinhead Is the Dream"	4:56
5.	"On Islands"	4:48
6.	"Feeling Down"	4:10
7.	"Sooner Than We Think"	3:50
8.	"A Picture of Life"	3:40
9.	"Les Rues"	3:30
10.	"Rue de Moorslede" (instrumental)	0:35

== Personnel ==
Camouflage

- Heiko Maile – vocals, programming, moorsuphon
- Marcus Meyn – vocals, programming
- Oliver Kreyssig – vocals, programming, rhythm

Additional personnel

Dan Lacksman, Georges Alexander Van Dam, Ingo Ito, James Herter, Jean-Michel Alexandre, Michael Moers, Simone Winter, Thomas Dorr, Caroline, Jean-Paul Dessy, Johannes Luley, Patrick Dussart de la Iglesia.
