= Meanwhile (Camouflage album) =

Studio album by Camouflage
- Released: 26 March 1991
- Recorded: October 1990 – 1991
- Genre: Synth-pop
- Length: 65:55
- Label: Metronome; Atlantic
- Producer: Colin Thurston; Camouflage

Camouflage chronology
Methods of Silence (1989)	Meanwhile (1991)	Bodega Bohemia (1993)

Singles from Meanwhile
- 1. "Heaven (I Want You)" Released: 1991; 2. "This Day/Handsome" Released: 1991

Professional ratings
Review scores
Source	Rating
AllMusic	1.5/5 stars

Meanwhile is the third studio album by German synth-pop trio Camouflage, released on 26 March 1991 by Metronome in Europe and Atlantic Records in North America.

Unlike Camouflage's earlier albums, and most of their later work, Meanwhile features more 'organic' instruments like real drums and guest musicians playing conventional instruments. However, this change brought with it controversy, and Marcus later said that if they had been given advice against the change in style, things may have gone differently.

Two singles were released from "Meanwhile: "Heaven (I Want You)" and a double a-side of "This Day" and "Handsome". "Heaven (I Want You)" charted at number 57 in Germany.

== Track listing ==
All tracks written by Camouflage, except tracks 5 and 7, written by Nia Neutron.

1. "Seize Your Day" – 4:37
2. "Heaven (I Want You)" – 5:15
3. "Mellotron" – 3:44
4. "Mother" – 4:32
5. "Dad" – 5:17
6. "Where the Happy Live" – 4:05
7. "These Eyes" – 3:41
8. "What For?" – 3:16
9. "Waiting" – 4:50
10. "Accordion" – 5:03
11. "This Day" – 3:56
12. "Handsome" – 4:01
13. "Bitter Sweet" – 4:19
14. "Spellbound" – 4:45
15. "Who the Hell Is David Butler?" – 4:13

== Personnel ==
Camouflage

- Heiko Maile
- Marcus Meyn

Additional personnel

- Gavin Harrison – drums

Technical

- Mixed By – Colin Thurston, Tom Colley
- Mixed By [Assistant] – Eugene Ellis, Ron Aslan
- Photography By – Wolfgang Wilde
- Producer – Camouflage, Colin Thurston
- Recorded By [Assistant] – Matthew Ollivier
