= Spice Crackers =

Studio album by Camouflage
- Released: 11 September 1995; 28 August 2009 (remastered)
- Recorded: October 1994–1995
- Genre: Synthpop
- Label: BMG, Bureau B
- Producer: Heiko Maile, Stephan Fischer

Camouflage chronology
Bodega Bohemia (1993)	Spice Crackers (1995)	Sensor (2003)

Singles from Spice Crackers
- 1. "Bad News" Released: August 1995; 2. "X-Ray" Released: 1996

Professional ratings
Review scores
Source	Rating
Allmusic	3.5/5 stars

Spice Crackers is the fifth studio album from German synthpop group Camouflage, released on September 11, 1995, by BMG.

== Background ==
The band's new contract with BMG Germany provided them with full creative freedom, allowing the two to utilise works originally intended for their failed opera project and make them much more experimental, and sometimes even inspired by science fiction films. In March 1995 the band performed in Stuttgart and debuted the new material.

Overall, the album was a completely new venture for the group, and unfortunately was not a success. Due to this, the band went their separate ways.

== Singles ==
Two singles were released from the record: "Bad News" in August 1995 and "X-Ray" in early 1996. Music videos were filmed for both. "X-Ray" was remixed by Tranceformer and Ronda Ray (alias Heiko Maile) for release. Both were included on the band's 2001 retrospective "Rewind".

== Re-release ==
Due to the album being out of print, the band remastered and re-released the album in 2009. It features two discs, the second comprising B-sides and other rarities, some unreleased, from the Spice Crackers era. A download-only album was also released, containing all the remixes from the two singles.

== Track listing ==
No.	Title	Writer(s)	Length
1.	"Spice Crackers"	H. Maile / M. Meyn / I. Ito	3:34
2.	"X-Ray"	H. Maile / M. Meyn	6:24
3.	"Kraft"	H. Maile / M. Meyn	3:46
4.	"Electronic Music"	H. Maile / M. Meyn	2:40
5.	"Bad News"	Moon Martin	6:01
6.	"Days Run Wild"	I. Ito	5:16
7.	"A Place in China (Heaven's Not)"	H. Maile / M. Meyn	6:09
8.	"Zwischenspiel 2"	H. Maile / M. Meyn	1:35
9.	"Funky Service (What Do You Want to Drink?)"	H. Maile / M. Meyn	4:19
10.	"Back to Heaven"	H. Maile / M. Meyn	7:38
11.	"Je suis le Dieu"	H. Maile / M. Meyn	5:24
12.	"Ronda's Trigger"	H. Maile / M. Meyn	9:38
13.	"Travelling Without Moving"	H. Maile / M. Meyn	1:26
14.	"Spacetrain"	H. Maile / M. Meyn / I. Ito	8:35

2009 Remastered Edition Disc 1
No.	Title	Writer(s)	Length
1.	"Spice Crackers"	H. Maile / M. Meyn / I. Ito	3:34
2.	"X-Ray"	H. Maile / M. Meyn	6:24
3.	"Kraft"	H. Maile / M. Meyn	3:46
4.	"Electronic Music"	H. Maile / M. Meyn	2:40
5.	"Bad News"	Moon Martin	6:01
6.	"Days Run Wild"	I. Ito	5:16
7.	"A Place In China (Heaven's Not)"	H. Maile / M. Meyn	6:09
8.	"Zwischenspiel 2"	H. Maile / M. Meyn	1:35
9.	"Funky Service (What Do You Want to Drink?)"	H. Maile / M. Meyn	4:19
10.	"Back to Heaven"	H. Maile / M. Meyn	7:38
11.	"Je Suis Le Dieu"	H. Maile / M. Meyn	5:24
12.	"Ronda's Trigger"	H. Maile / M. Meyn	9:38
13.	"Travelling Without Moving"	H. Maile / M. Meyn	1:26
14.	"Spacetrain"	H. Maile / M. Meyn / I. Ito	8:35

2009 Remastered Edition Disc 2
No.	Title	Writer(s)	Length
1.	"Spice Crackers" (FX Mix)	H. Maile / M. Meyn / I. Ito	1:12
2.	"Bad News" (Aural Float Mix)	Moon Martin	10:10
3.	"In Search of Ray Milland"	H. Maile	5:42
4.	"Wet Electronics"	H. Maile / M. Meyn	3:58
5.	"Back to Heaven" (Flanger Mix)	H. Maile / M. Meyn	4:51
6.	"Spacetrain" (Ambient Mix)	H. Maile / M. Meyn / I. Ito	7:47
7.	"Je Suis Le Dieu" (Demo Version)	H. Maile / M. Meyn	3:58
8.	"Liberation (Part 2)"	H. Maile / M. Meyn / I. Ito / S. Fischer	11:05
9.	"Steward"	H. Maile	6:40
10.	"Eros Lunch" (Edit)	H. Maile / I. Ito	5:14
11.	"5 Seconds" (Edit)	H. Maile	5:16
12.	"The Kroeppelshagen Tapes #3" (Detail 1)	H. Maile / M. Meyn / I. Ito	2:19
13.	"The Kroeppelshagen Tapes #4" (Detail 3)	H. Maile / M. Meyn / I. Ito	4:04
14.	"Band introduction by Wu Shan Zhuan"	H. Maile / M. Meyn	0:39

== Personnel ==
Producer – Heiko Maile
Guitar, Keyboards – Ingo Ito
Remastered (2009 Edition) by – Sven Geiger
Vocals – Marcus Meyn

== Credits ==
Arranged By – Heiko Maile, Ingo Ito, Marcus Meyn
Art Direction, Photography By – Michel Moers
Design, Graphics [Computergraphics] – Gisela Ludwig
Lyrics By – Heiko Maile (tracks: 1 to 4, 7 to 14), Ingo Ito (tracks: 5, 14), Marcus Meyn (tracks: 1 to 4, 7 to 14)
Music By – Heiko Maile (tracks: 1 to 4, 7 to 14), Ingo Ito (tracks: 1, 6, 14), Marcus Meyn (tracks: 1 to 4, 7 to 14)
Producer – Heiko Maile
Producer [Additional] – Ingo Ito, Stephan Fischer
℗ 1995 BMG Ariola Hamburg GmbH

== Charts ==
Chart performance for Spice Crackers
Chart (2025)	Peak position
German Albums (Offizielle Top 100)	37
German Pop Albums (Offizielle Top 100)	15
