= Bodega Bohemia =

Studio album by Camouflage
- Released: 26 April 1993
- Recorded: 1992–1993
- Genre: Synthpop
- Label: Metronome 517 703-2
- Producer: Dan Lacksman, Heiko Maile

Camouflage chronology
Meanwhile (1991)	Bodega Bohemia (1993)	Spice Crackers (1995)

Singles from Bodega Bohemia
- 1. "Suspicious Love" Released: March 1993; 2. "Close (We Stroke the Flames)" Released: June 1993; 3. "Jealousy" Released: August 1993

Bodega Bohemia is the fourth studio album by German synthpop band Camouflage, released on April 26, 1993 by Metronome Musik. The band moved to Hamburg and began working on the album in mid-1992 following the release of the side-project EP Areu Areu. The aim of the album was to return to an electronic presentation with as much influence from electronics as possible.

The resulting album was not promoted well by Metronome, who only released the album and its three singles in Germany. Bodega Bohemia was the band's last album for the label.

== Singles ==
Three singles were issued from the album. The first, "Suspicious Love" was released in March 1993, followed by the second single, "Close (We Stroke the Flames)" in June. Both singles were remixed for release. A third single, "Jealousy" was released in August.

== Track listing ==
All songs written by Camouflage.

No.	Title	Lyrics	Music	Length
1.	"Pedestrian's Adventures"	Markus Meyn, Nia Neutron	Heiko Maile	3:54
2.	"Crime"	Markus Meyn	Heiko Maile	5:28
3.	"Jealousy"	Markus Meyn	Heiko Maile, Markus Meyn	3:30
4.	"Time Is Over"	Markus Meyn	Markus Meyn	5:36
5.	"Falling"	Markus Meyn	Heiko Maile	6:39
6.	"Suspicious Love"	Markus Meyn	Heiko Maile	5:00
7.	"Bondage People"	Markus Meyn	Heiko Maile, Markus Meyn	5:31
8.	"Close"	Markus Meyn, Nia Neutron	Heiko Maile, Markus Meyn, Ingo Ito	4:12
9.	"In Your Ivory Tower"	Ingo Ito	Heiko Maile	8:41

== Credits ==
Backing Vocals – Julie Ocean
Design [Graphic Design] – Ingrid Albrecht
Drum Programming [Add. Drum Loops] – Thomas Dörr
Electric Guitar, Programmed By [Loops] – Ingo Ito
Electronics, Sequenced By – Heiko Maile
Photography By – Reiner Pfisterer
Producer – Dan Lacksman, Heiko Maile
Technician [Studio], Electronics [Machines] – Dan Lacksman
Violin [Electronic], Performer [Add. Sounds] – Julian Boyd
Vocals – Marcus Meyn
℗1993 Metronome Musik GmbH, Hamburg

== Charts ==
2024 weekly chart performance for Bodega Bohemia
Chart (2024)	Peak position
German Albums (Offizielle Top 100)	10
