= Best of Camouflage: We Stroke the Flames =

Greatest hits album by Camouflage
- Released: December 28, 1999 (US)
- Genre: Synthpop
- Length: 72:10
- Label: Capitol
- Producer: Axel Henninger, Dan Lacksman, Heiko Maile, Colin Thurston

Professional ratings
Review scores
Source	Rating
Allmusic	4/5 stars

Best of Camouflage: We Stroke the Flames is German synthpop group Camouflage's first compilation album, released in 1997 in Germany and 1999 in the US. It includes all of their singles from 1987 to 1993, excluding "This Day", along with several album tracks and a remix of "Love Is a Shield" by William Orbit. This album, however, contained no input from either band members.

Former member Oliver Kreyssig helped in the design of the album art, and as a result, rejoined the band by 1999.

== Track listing ==
No.	Title	Length
1.	"The Great Commandment"	4:17
2.	"Jealousy"	3:30
3.	"Sooner Than We Think"	3:51
4.	"Handsome"	4:01
5.	"One Fine Day"	3:59
6.	"Neighbours"	3:41
7.	"Suspicious Love"	4:15
8.	"A Picture of Life"	3:42
9.	"Love is a Shield"	3:57
10.	"Strangers Thoughts"	3:33
11.	"Crime"	5:27
12.	"Heaven (I Want You)"	5:15
13.	"Waiting"	4:50
14.	"Close (We Stroke The Flames)"	4:01
15.	"I Once Had A Dream"	4:57
16.	"Love Is A Shield (William Orbit Dub Mix)"	8:06
