= Relocated (album) =

Studio album by Camouflage
- Released: 28 August 2006
- Recorded: 2004–2006
- Genre: Synthpop
- Length: 60:08
- Label: SPV
- Producer: Heiko Maile

Camouflage chronology
Sensor (2003)	Relocated (2006)	The Singles (2014)

Singles from Relocated
- 1. "Motif Sky" Released: 28 July 2006; 2. "Something Wrong" Released: 17 November 2006; 3. "The Pleasure Remains" Released: 1 January 2007

Professional ratings
Review scores
Source	Rating
Release Magazine	7/10 stars
laut.de	3/5 stars

Relocated is the seventh studio album from German synthpop group Camouflage, released on August 28, 2006 by SPV Records. Three singles were released from the record: "Motif Sky", "Something Wrong", and "The Pleasure Remains".

== Reviews ==
Release Magazine gave the album a mostly positive review, stating "...slightly more pop tuned, but still holds all the Camouflage trademark elements. Personal vocal performances, gloom and pop all in one. The single "Motif Sky" is one of the tracks that have blossomed through repeated listening, as have "We Are Lovers" and my current favourite "Dreaming". Except for the exceptionally dreary "How Do You Feel?", "Relocated" is a solid effort, maybe lacking somewhat in raw hit power".

== Track listing ==
All songs written by Camouflage.

No.	Title	Writer(s)	Length
1.	"Memory"	Heiko Maile, Marcus Meyn, Oliver Kreyssig	1:06
2.	"We Are Lovers"	Heiko Maile, Marcus Meyn, Oliver Kreyssig	3:59
3.	"Motif Sky"	Heiko Maile, Marcus Meyn, Oliver Kreyssig	3:29
4.	"Real Thing"	Heiko Maile, Marcus Meyn, Oliver Kreyssig	3:11
5.	"Passing By"	Heiko Maile, Marcus Meyn, Oliver Kreyssig	4:05
6.	"Confusion"	Heiko Maile, Marcus Meyn, Oliver Kreyssig	3:47
7.	"The Perfect Key"	Heiko Maile, Marcus Meyn, Oliver Kreyssig	5:32
8.	"Stream"	Heiko Maile, Marcus Meyn, Oliver Kreyssig	2:05
9.	"Dreaming"	Heiko Maile, Marcus Meyn, Oliver Kreyssig	5:00
10.	"The Pleasure Remains"	Heiko Maile, Marcus Meyn, Oliver Kreyssig	4:06
11.	"Bitter Taste"	Heiko Maile, Marcus Meyn, Oliver Kreyssig	5:04
12.	"Something Wrong"	Heiko Maile, Marcus Meyn, Oliver Kreyssig	4:48
13.	"Light"	Heiko Maile, Marcus Meyn, Oliver Kreyssig	1:02
14.	"How Do You Feel? (after 2 minutes of silence the hidden track "Last Contact" appears)"		14:15
Total length:			60:08

== Credits ==
- Arranged By – Heiko Maile, Marcus Meyn, Oliver Kreyssig
- Engineer [Additional Engineering] – Ronda Ray (alias Heiko Maile)
- Mastered By – Bo Kondren
- Mixed By – Jochen Schmalbach
- Producer – Heiko Maile
- Recorded By – Ronda Ray (alias Heiko Maile)
- Recorded By [Additional Recordings] – Christian Cyfus, Volker Hinkel
- Songwriter – Heiko Maile, Marcus Meyn, Oliver Kreyssig

℗ 2006 Synthetic Symphony
© 2006 Synthetic Symphony a division of SPV GmbH
