= Winhill/Losehill =

Swedish band

Winhill/Losehill is a Swedish six-member musical band from Umeå, Sweden led by vocalist Jonas Svennem. The band's name is taken from two mountains located in the English village of Hope, Derbyshire, namely Win Hill and Lose Hill. It is a tribute to the location where Jonas Svennem took part in a folk music camp at a younger age.

The group's debut album is Swing of Sorrow, a double album released on 22 February 2012. The album is dedicated to Jonas Svennem's mother Karin who had died of cancer a few years earlier. It went to #36 in the Swedish Albums Chart in its first week of release. The debut single from the album is 'Tell Her She’s the Light of the World'.

The band leader Jonas Svennem is the brother of Måns Svennem Lundberg, a well known producer including for Swedish band Deportees.

Winhill/Losehill released their second album "Trouble Will Snowball" in 2015.

== Members ==
- Jonas Svennem (lead vocals, piano)
- Carl Åkerlund (lyricist)
- Kalle Lundin (guitar)
- Henrik Nybom (drums)
- Sofia Högstadius (violin)
- Petrus Sjövik (bass)

== Discography ==
=== Albums ===
2012: Swing of Sorrow (2CDs) (reached #36 in Swedish Albums Chart)

==== Track list ====
- Disc 1
1. Karin's Hymn
2. Oh Lord
3. I Will Never Get Enough
4. Retreat
5. Tell Her She's the Light of the World
6. The House Is Black
7. Lake Marten
8. Shuffle Mountain
9. Those Same Damned Days
- Disc 2
1. Winhill/Losehill Part II
2. Life & Death
3. Long Way to Next Stop
4. Don't Let the Inside Shine Out
5. I Leave You 'Cause I Don't Care
6. Inner City Blues
7. Hope Village
8. The Heart Is a Mussel
9. Back to School
10. Stay Another Day

2015: Trouble Will Snowball

2022: The Grief

=== Singles ===
2012: "Tell Her She's the Light of the World"

2022: "Human River"
