= The Great Commandment (song) =

1987 song by Camouflage

Single by Camouflage

from the album Voices & Images
- B-side: "Pompeji"
- Released: September 1987
- Genre: Synth-pop
- Length: 4:17 (album version); 3:12 (7″ remix)
- Label: Metronome
- Songwriters: Heiko Maile; Marcus Meyn; Oliver Kreyssig

Camouflage singles chronology
"The Great Commandment" (1987)	"Strangers' Thoughts" (1988)

Music video
- "The Great Commandment" on YouTube

"The Great Commandment" is a song by German synth-pop trio Camouflage. Originally recorded in 1983, the song was re-recorded in 1987 and released as their debut single in 1987. It was included on their 1988 debut album, Voices & Images.

The single gave Camouflage their only number one dance hit. "The Great Commandment" stayed at the top spot for three non-consecutive weeks. The single became popular on independent stations and crossed over to the mainstream American pop charts, peaking at number 59 in February 1989. In their native Germany, "The Great Commandment" went to number 14, and reached the top ten in more than twenty countries.

== Music video ==
The music video was directed by Rainer Thieding, and was filmed on a black and white film on 14 and 15 November 1987 at Butenholt-Studios in Kröppelshagen.

It depicts the band members amongst a crowd of children in a factory, who appear to be protesting against a spokesperson of some kind. One of the children discovers a control panel underneath the stage, and proves that the spokesperson is in fact a robot controlled by the mechanism. This causes the spokesperson to malfunction and fall over, after which the band and children leave.

== Track listing ==
7″ single (Germany, 1987)
No.	Title	Length
1.	"The Great Commandment" (7″ remix)	3:15
2.	"Pompeji"	3:28
Total length:		6:43

12″ single (Germany, 1987)/CD single (Germany, 1988)
No.	Title	Length
1.	"The Great Commandment" (extended dance mix)	5:58
2.	"The Great Commandment" (extended radio mix)	5:37
3.	"Pompeji" (extended version)	5:23
Total length:		16:18

12″ single (US, 1988)
No.	Title	Length
1.	"The Great Commandment" (12″ version)	6:10
2.	"The Great Commandment" (dub mix)	7:52
3.	"The Great Commandment" (extended dance mix)	5:58
4.	"Pompeji" (extended version)	5:23
Total length:		24:43

12″ single (UK, 1988)
No.	Title	Length
1.	"The Great Commandment" (Justin Strauss remix)	7:22
2.	"The Great Commandment" (Acid Commandment vocal)	6:32
3.	"The Great Commandment" (Great Commandment Luongo mix 12″)	6:16
Total length:		20:10

== Charts ==
Chart performance for "The Great Commandment"
Chart (1987–1989)	Peak position
France (SNEP)	45
Germany (GfK)	14
US Alternative Airplay (Billboard)	3
US Billboard Hot 100	59
US Dance Club Songs (Billboard)	1

== Certifications ==
Region	Certification	Certified units/sales
Germany (BVMI)	Gold	250,000^{‡}
^{‡} Sales+streaming figures based on certification alone.

== The Great Commandment 2.0 ==
"The Great Commandment 2.0"

Single by Camouflage
- Released: 9 April 2001
- Recorded: 2001
- Genre: Synth-pop
- Length: 3:55 (radio edit)
- Label: Polydor
- Songwriters: Heiko Maile; Marcus Meyn; Oliver Kreyssig

Camouflage singles chronology
"Thief" (1999)	"The Great Commandment 2.0" (2001)	"Me and You" (2003)

In 2001, Camouflage re-recorded their debut single "The Great Commandment" and released it that year as a comeback attempt at their label's suggestion. Vocals were also re-recorded. The single was produced by London trio "Toy" and drums were provided by Christian Eigner, former tourmate of Depeche Mode. It reached number 85 on the charts.

=== Track listing ===
CD single
No.	Title	Length
1.	"The Great Commandment 2.0" (radio edit)	3:55
2.	"The Great Commandment 2.0" (Very. mix)	5:23
3.	"The Great Commandment 2.0" (Johannes Heil remix)	5:09
4.	"The Great Commandment 2.0" (instrumental)	5:28
Total length:		19:15

12″ single
No.	Title	Length
1.	"The Great Commandment 2.0" (Johannes Heil remix)	5:08
2.	"The Great Commandment 2.0" (Toy mix)	5:26
3.	"The Great Commandment 2.0" (Very remix)	4:53
Total length:		15:37

=== Charts ===
Chart performance for "The Great Commandment 2.0"
Chart (2001)	Peak position
Germany (GfK)	85
