= Fancy (singer) =

German disco singer

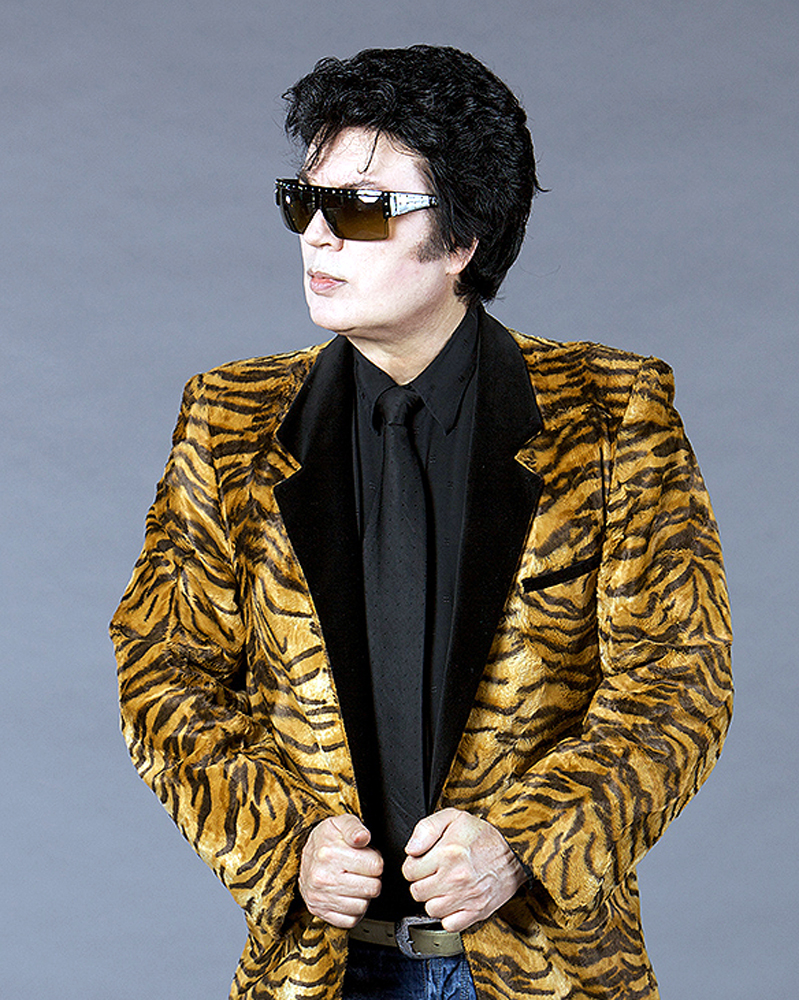
- Segieth in 2009

Background information
- Also known as: Tess Teiges
- Born: Manfred Alois Segieth; 7 July 1946 (age 80); Munich, Germany
- Genre: Euro disco
- Occupations: Singer; songwriter; record producer
- Years active: 1962–present
- Labels: Metronome; Polydor; ZYX; BMG
- Website: fancy-online.com

Manfred Alois Segieth (born 7 July 1946), better known by his stage name Fancy, is a German singer, songwriter, and record producer. His greatest success came in the 1980s as a singer of the Eurodisco genre, with songs like "Flames of Love", "Slice Me Nice", "Bolero (Hold Me in Your Arms Again)", "Chinese Eyes", or "Lady of Ice" being chart hits in numerous countries across the world.

== Early life ==
Manfred Alois Segieth was born on 7 July 1946 in Munich. Fancy started playing guitar at the age of twelve. While attending a boarding school where the enjoyment of worldly music was not allowed, he had to secretly listen to the pop records of artists such as Ted Herold and Peter Kraus.

At age 14, he switched to the humanistic high school in Munich. During and after high school, he worked in bands as a guitarist and bass player, though he mainly performed as a singer. He performed with these bands in numerous dance halls. His parents did not share Fancy's enthusiasm for music. His father only changed his mind after recovering from a major operation.

== Career ==
Segieth's career commenced in 1984 as a European-based pop singer and songwriter. His role as a musician rapidly expanded as a producer, which lead to his music receiving worldwide airplay. The international disco hits "Slice Me Nice" and "Chinese Eyes" reached second place on the US Billboard Dance Charts. A further nine of his singles charted in both the top 100 of the Media Control Singles Charts, this mainly covered the German charts during the mid to late 80s. "Flames of Love" has received worldwide exposure since 1988; as it was his highest-charting hit.

Fancy's work include many studio albums and singles as well as compilation and remixed CDs.

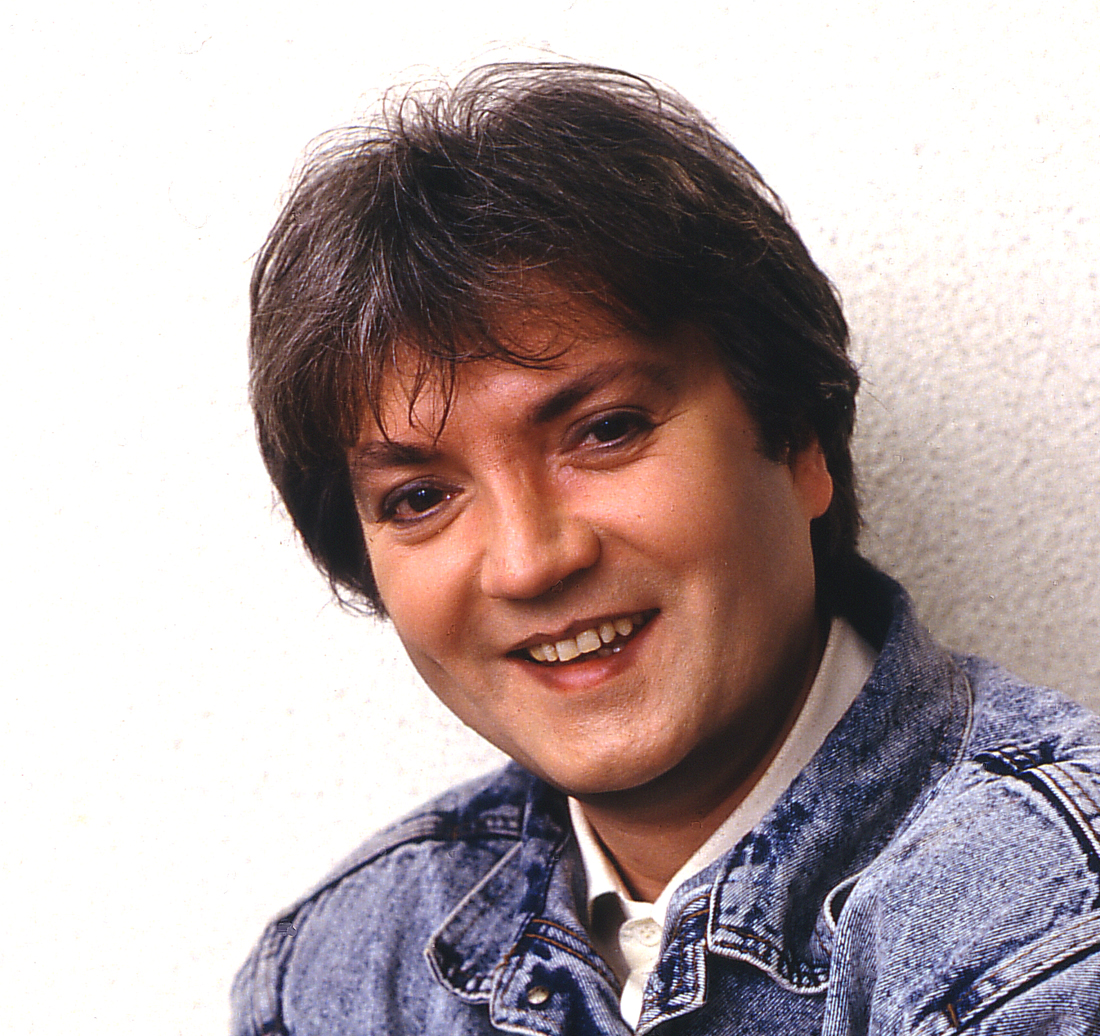
Fancy in 1987

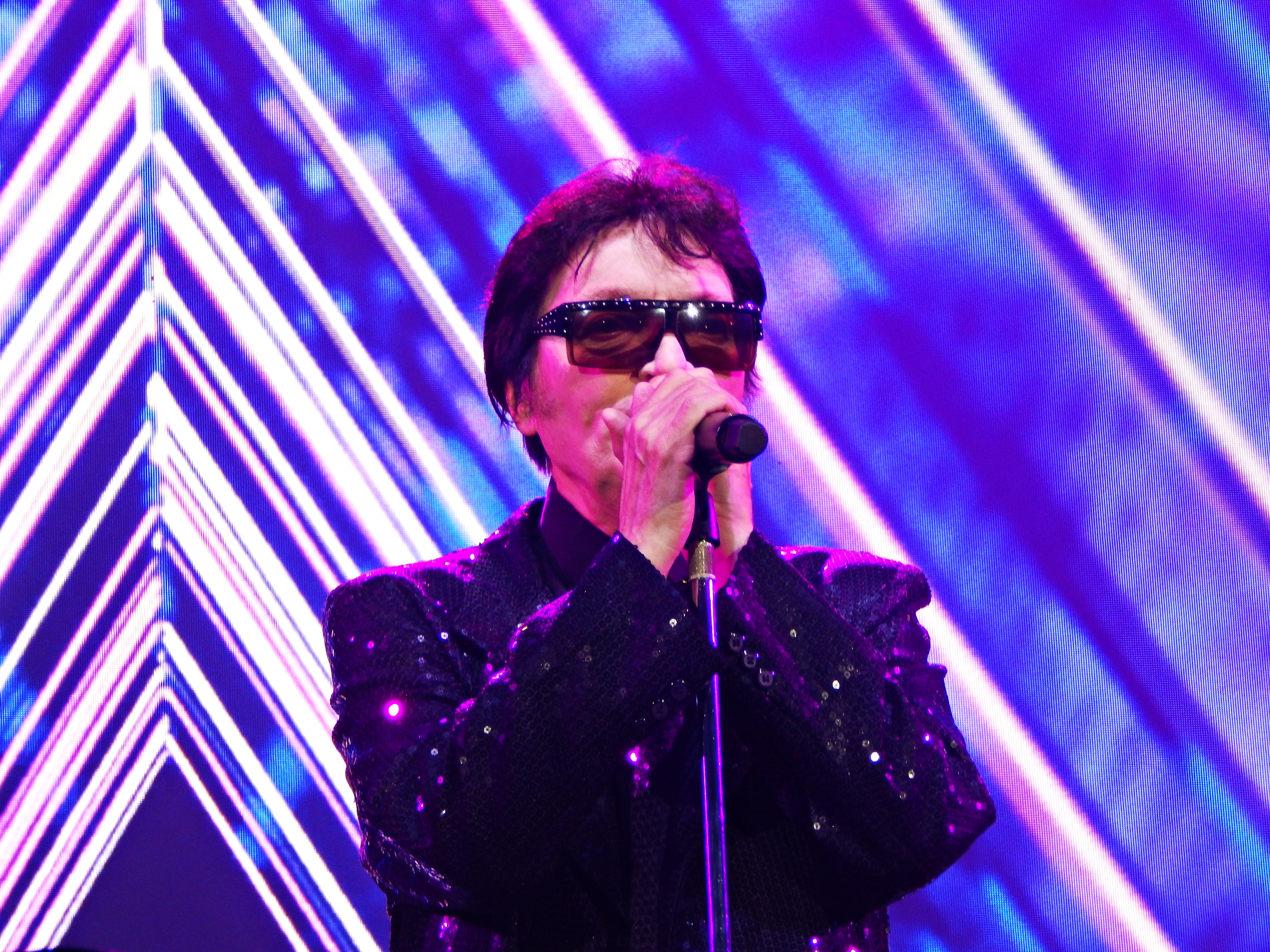
Fancy in 2021

In 2009, Fancy founded the German Tiger Foundation, dedicated to improving the quality of life for zoo tigers. The foundation has since been dissolved.

== Discography ==
=== Albums ===
- Get Your Kicks (1985)
- Contact (1986)
- Flames of Love (1988)
- All My Loving (1989)
- Five (1990)
- Six - Deep in My Heart (1991)
- Blue Planet Zikastar (1995)
- Colours of Life (1996)
- Christmas in Vegas (1996)
- Blue Planet (1998)
- D.I.S.C.O. (1999)
- Strip Down (2000)
- Locomotion (2001)
- Voices from Heaven (2004)
- Forever Magic (2008)
- Masquerade (Les Marionettes) (2021)
- Viva La Vida (2023)
- One Last Time (2026)

=== Compilations and remixes ===
Title	Format	Year	Label
Introducing Fancy	12''	1985	Power Records
Gold	LP, CD	1987	Metronome
Gold Remix	CD	1988	Metronome
That's Fancy	CD	1988	Metronome
Hooked on a Loop	TAPE	1991	Franky & Friends
Golden Stars • Golden Hits	CD	1993	Spectrum
Greatest Hits	CD	1994	Metronome
It's Me Fancy (The Hits 1984 – 1994)	CD	1994	Koch International
Best of Fancy	CD	1998	What's Up?!
Hit Party	CD	1998	Jupiter Records
Fancy for Fans	CD	2001	ZYX Music
Best Of... Die Hits Auf Deutsch	CD	2003	Koch International
I Love Fancy	CD	2004	Blanco Y Negro
Greatest Hits	CD	2004	Silver Star
Hit Collection	CD	2007	Hargent Media
Disco Forever	CD	2009	ZYX Music
25th Anniversary Box	CD	2010	4everMUSIC
Bolero The Hit Collection & More	CD	2012	Retro Records
The Original Maxi-Singles Collection	CD	2013	Pokorny Music Solutions
Shock and Show	CD	2015	Pokorny Music Solutions
30 Years. The New Best of Fancy	CD	2018	Sony Music
Diamonds Forever Part 1	CD	2022	Original Records

=== Singles ===
Title	Year	Peak chart positions										
Title	Year	GER	SPA	AUT	SUI	NET	BEL	SWE	FIN	FRA	US Dance	HKG
"Slice Me Nice"	1984	11	—	2	9	—	—	7	—	—	—	—
"Chinese Eyes"	1984	9	—	17	9	—	—	—	23	82	2	—
"Get Lost Tonight"	1984	31	—	—	19	—	—	—	—	—	—	—
"L.A.D.Y O."	1985	—	—	—	—	—	—	—	—	—	—	—
"Check It Out"	1985	—	—	—	—	—	—	—	—	—	13	—
"Bolero (Hold Me in Your Arms Again)"	1985	7	1	—	18	17	11	9	2	—	—	—
"Lady of Ice"	1986	13	—	—	18	—	—	17	26	—	—	—
"Latin Fire"	1987	24	—	—	11	—	—	—	—	—	—	—
"Raving Queen"	1987	—	—	—	—	—	—	—	—	—	—	—
"China Blue"	1987	50	34	—	—	—	—	—	—	—	—	—
"Flames of Love"	1988	14	13	13	—	—	—	—	—	—	—	1
"Fools Cry"	1988	18	15	—	—	—	—	—	13	—	—	—
"Angel Eyes"	1989	—	—	—	—	—	—	—	13	—	—	—
"All My Loving" / "Running Man"	1989	—	—	—	—	—	—	—	16	—	—	—
"No Tears"	1989	44	—	—	—	—	—	—	—	—	—	—
"When Guardian Angels Cry"	1990	—	—	—	—	—	—	—	—	—	—	—
"When Guardian Angels...Rap"	1991	—	—	—	—	—	—	—	—	—	—	—
"Fools Cry Rap"	1991	—	—	—	—	—	—	—	—	—	—	—
"No Way Out" / "Cool Snake"	1993	—	—	—	—	—	—	—	—	—	—	—
"Love Has Called Me Home"	1993	—	—	—	—	—	—	—	—	—	—	—
"Long Way to Paradise"	1994	—	—	—	—	—	—	—	—	—	—	—
"Again & Again"	1995	—	—	—	—	—	—	—	—	—	—	—
"I Can Give You Love"	1995	—	—	—	—	—	—	—	—	—	—	—
"The Big Dust" – Remixes	1996	—	—	—	—	—	—	—	—	—	—	—
"Deep Blue Sky"	1996	—	—	—	—	—	—	—	—	—	—	—
"Colours Of Life"	1996	—	—	—	—	—	—	—	—	—	—	—
"Come Back and Break My Heart"	1998	—	—	—	—	—	—	—	—	—	—	—
"D.I.S.C.O. (Lust for Life)"	1999	—	—	—	—	—	—	—	—	—	—	—
"How Do You Feel Right Now?"	1999	—	—	—	—	—	—	—	—	—	—	—
"Gimme a Sign"	2000	—	—	—	—	—	—	—	—	—	—	—
"We Can Move a Mountain"	2000	—	—	—	—	—	—	—	—	—	—	—
"Na Na Na Na Hey Hey Hey Kiss Him Goodbye"	2001	—	—	—	—	—	—	—	—	—	—	—
"Pretty Woman"	2002	—	—	—	—	—	—	—	—	—	—	—
"A Voice in the Dark 2008"	2008	—	—	—	—	—	—	—	—	—	—	—
"I Should Have Known Better"	2014	—	—	—	—	—	—	—	—	—	—	—
"Stronger Together" (featuring Linda Jo Rizzo)	2014	—	—	—	—	—	—	—	—	—	—	—
"I Like Your Smile"	2021	—	—	—	—	—	—	—	—	—	—	—
"Summer Wine" (Lian Ross feat. Fancy)	2021	—	—	—	—	—	—	—	—	—	—	—
"Rockabye me"	2021	—	—	—	—	—	—	—	—	—	—	—
"I'm still a fool"	2021	—	—	—	—	—	—	—	—	—	—	—
"Running Man"	2022	—	—	—	—	—	—	—	—	—	—	—
"Faster than a Bullet" (featuring Roubix)	2024	—	—	—	—	—	—	—	—	—	—	—
"—" denotes a recording that did not chart or was not released in that territory.
