= Heiko Maile =

German musician and composer (born 1966)

Heiko Maile (born 12 January 1966) is an Australian-born German musician and composer. He is best known as a member of the band Camouflage and as the composer for the score of the films The Wave and We Are the Night and won the Deutscher Fernsehpreis for best music in 2017.

== Biography ==
Born in Sydney, Australia, Heiko Maile grew up in Bietigheim-Bissingen. His first musical steps were at a young age when he started taking classical guitar lessons. His career as a musician and producer began in 1983, as one of the founding members of the synthpop band Camouflage. In the 1990s, Maile founded with Marcus Meyn the music publishing company, Areu Areu. During this time, he met the music producer Mathias Willvonseder. They formed a long-term partnership, resulting in numerous commercials and films, which were often awarded prizes at festivals. He is also a member of the Composers' Collective Gutleut, where he met composer and arranger Torsten Kamps, and the two began working closely together. During this time, Maile started to develop a desire to compose for films and approached producer Christian Becker.

Maile finally began composing for films in 2006 when he did the music for a short film called Basti. Maile was then hired by Becker to create the score as well as a few original songs for the teen-thriller The Wave. The film was a hit among both critics and viewers. He also made music for the popular film The Crocodiles, and its sequels The Crocodiles Strike Back and The Crocodiles: All for One.

Maile went on to have a good working relationship with Christian Becker and The Wave director Dennis Gansel and composed the music for We Are the Night, which was nominated for German Film Prize (the German Oscars) in 2011.

Heiko Maile now lives and works in Stuttgart.

== Filmography ==
- 2006: Basti (shortfilm) (short)
- 2008: The Wave
- 2009: The Crocodiles
- 2010: The Crocodiles Strike Back
- 2010: We Are The Night
- 2010: Love & Theft (short)
- 2011: The Crocodiles: All for One
- 2012: The Fourth State
- 2012: Turkish for Beginners
- 2014: Nuggets (short)
- 2015: Das Gewinnerlos
- 2015: Abschussfahrt
- 2016: Winnetou - Eine neue Welt, Winnetou & Old Shatterhand
- 2016: Winnetou - Das Geheimnis vom Silbersee
- 2016: Winnetou - Der letzte Kampf
- 2016: Allein gegen die Zeit - Der Film, Time Heroes
- 2017: Die Vierhändige, Four Hands
- 2017: Luna, Luna’s Revenge
- 2018: Fly Rocket Fly - Mit Macheten zu den Sternen, Fly Rocket Fly
- 2019: Killerman
- 2019: We Are the Wave (TV series)
