= Warner Music Sweden =

Swedish record company and label

Warner Music Sweden AB
- Parent company: Warner Music Group
- Founded: 1949
- Genre: Various
- Country of origin: Sweden
- Location: Rehnsgatan 20, 113 57 Stockholm, Sweden
- Official website: warnermusic.se

Logo of Metronome Records from 1961

Warner Music Sweden AB (previously Metronome Records) is a Swedish record company and label, a subsidiary of Warner Music Group. The Swedish division of WMG is a successor to Metronome Records, which was established in 1949 by Anders Burman, Lars Burman, and Börje Ekberg and was based in Stockholm. and concentrated on pop and jazz. Metronome had operations in Sweden, Denmark, and Germany, and signed Alice Babs, Bent Fabric, Sonya Hedenbratt, Nina & Frederik, Ola Magnell, Charlie Norman, Pugh Rogefeldt, Kalle Sändare, Bernt Staf, Owe Thörnqvist, and Cornelis Vreeswijk. Its jazz catalogue, from 1949 to 1965, also included Arne Domnérus, Rolf Ericson, Lars Gullin, Bengt Hallberg, Zoot Sims, and Toots Thielemans. In 1979, Metronome's Swedish arm was purchased by Warner Music Group. In 1998, Anderson Records was merged with Warner Music Sweden.

In February 2013, Warner Music Group acquired most of the European EMI catalogue, including its Swedish back catalogue (renamed as "Parlophone Music Sweden"), from the Universal Music Group.

In June 2016, Warner Music acquired the Swedish compilation label X5 Music Group.

== Artists ==
The list contains artists signed directly to Warner Music Sweden.

- 3OH!3
- AJR
- Ace Wilder
- Adam Kanyama
- Alina Devecerski
- Alter Bridge
- Arash
- Avenged Sevenfold
- Avicii
- B.o.B
- Basshunter
- Biffy Clyro
- Birdy
- Björn Skifs
- Bruno Mars
- CeeLo Green
- Charli XCX
- Cher
- Christer Sjögren
- Christina Perri
- Christopher
- Clean Bandit
- Coldplay
- Damon Albarn
- Die Ärzte
- Donkeyboy
- Ebbot Lundberg
- Echosmith
- Edda Magnason
- Eldkvarn
- Eric Amarillo
- Fancy
- Foals
- Fritjof & Pikanen
- fun.
- Gesaffelstein
- Goo Goo Dolls
- Green Day
- Gyllene Tider
- Gym Class Heroes
- Halestorm
- Iron Maiden
- Jonny Jakobsen
- James Blunt
- Jason Mraz
- Josef Johansson
- Josh Groban
- Joshua Radin
- Justice
- Kleerup
- Kylie Minogue
- Laleh
- Lani Mo
- Lil Peep
- Lily Allen
- Linkin Park
- Little Jinder
- Louise Hoffsten
- Lupe Fiasco
- Lykke Li
- Magnus Uggla
- Marie Fredriksson
- Mauro Scocco
- Michael Bublé
- Mikael Wiehe
- Missy Elliott
- Muse
- NoNoNo
- Neil Young
- Nic & the Family
- Nickelback
- Nico & Vinz
- Opeth
- Oscar Zia
- PH3
- Paolo Nutini
- Paramore
- Prince
- Pugh Rogefeldt
- Red Hot Chili Peppers
- Rhymes & Riddim
- Rudimental
- Röyksopp
- Sanna Nielsen
- Seal
- Skrillex
- Slash
- Stallet
- Stone Sour
- Stone Temple Pilots
- T.I.
- The Black Keys
- The Sounds
- Thundermother
- Timbuktu
- Tinie Tempah
- Tommy Körberg
- TooManyLeftHands
- Tove Lo
- Travie McCoy
- Trey Songz
- Ulf Lundell
- Vance Joy
- Viktor & The Blood
- Waka Flocka Flame
- Winhill/Losehill
- Wiz Khalifa

== See also ==
- List of Warner Music Group labels

== Bibliography ==
- Håkan Lahger, Lasse Ermalm: De legendariska åren: Metronome Records (Premium Publishing) ISBN 978-91-89136-17-5
